= NS Line =

Streetcar route in Portland, Oregon

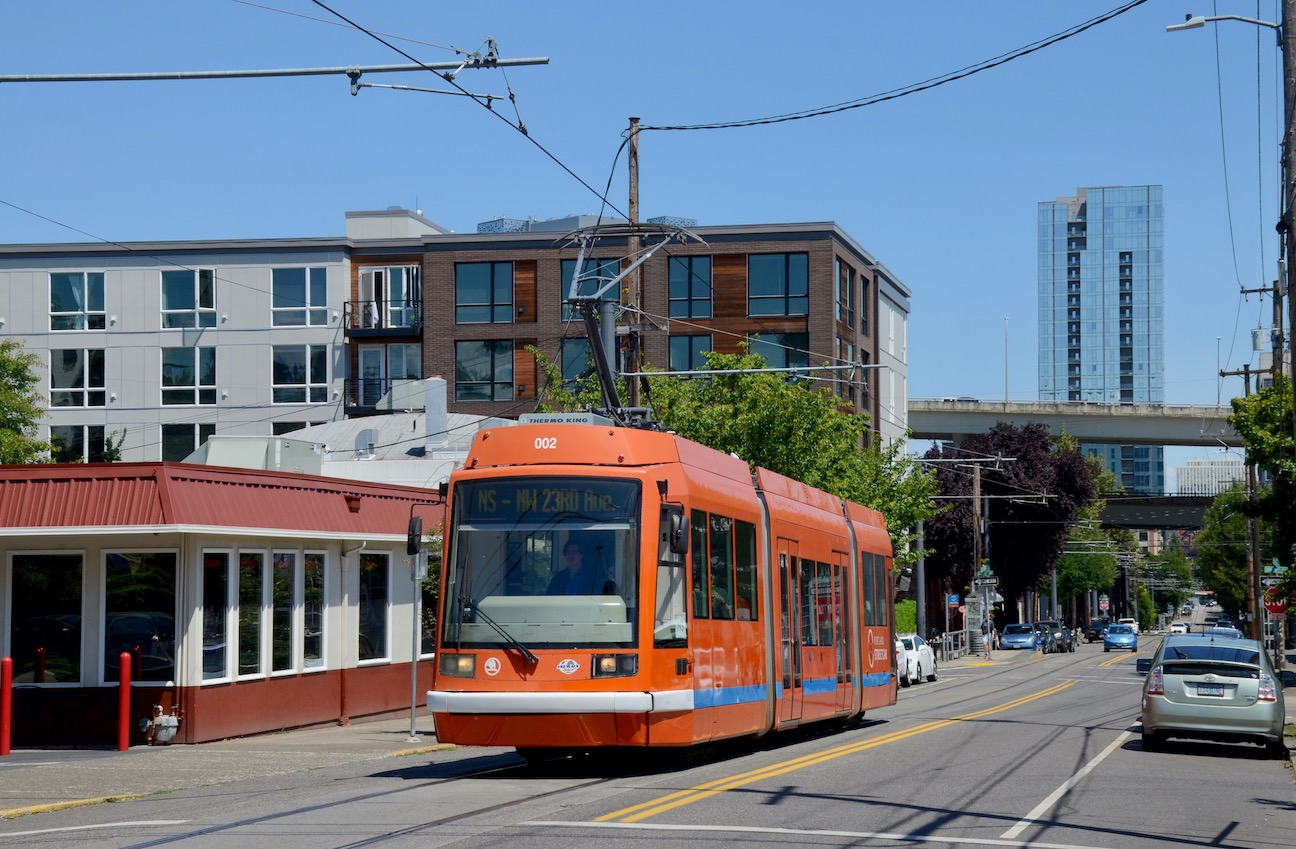
- A streetcar on Northwest Northrup Street in 2019

Overview
- Other name: Central City Streetcar
- Status: Operational
- Owner: City of Portland
- Locale: Portland, Oregon, U.S.
- Termini: Northwest 23rd & Marshall (north); Southwest Lowell & Bond (south)
- Stations: 39

Service
- Type: Streetcar
- System: Portland Streetcar
- Operators: Portland Streetcar, Inc.; TriMet (operators and maintenance)
- Daily ridership: 4,519 (as of May 2025)

History
- Opened: July 20, 2001

Technical
- Line length: 4.1 mi (6.6 km) (Note: Although several sources provide more precise figures for the length of each extension of the NS Line, which add up to 4.06 miles (6.53 km), Portland Streetcar, Inc., TriMet, Metro, and others give a rounded total for its one-way length at 4 miles.)
- Character: At-grade, mixed between street running and exclusive lane
- Track gauge: 4 ft 8 1/2 in (1,435 mm) standard gauge
- Electrification: Overhead line, 750 V DC

The North South Line (NS Line) is a streetcar route of the Portland Streetcar system in Portland, Oregon, United States. Operated by Portland Streetcar, Inc. and TriMet, the line runs 4.1 miles (6.6 km) in each direction between Northwest 23rd & Marshall and South Lowell & Bond, serving 39 stations and connecting Northwest District, Pearl District, downtown, Portland State University (PSU), and South Waterfront. Its cars operate daily on headways of 15 to 20 minutes. In May 2025, the NS Line had an average weekday ridership of 4,519.

Efforts to restore streetcar service in Portland, which had ceased operating in 1950, began in 1990 with the formation of a citizen advisory committee. After nearly a decade of planning, construction of the Central City Streetcar project began in 1999. The initial 2.4-mile (3.9 km) segment opened on July 20, 2001, to become the first line of the Portland Streetcar system and the first second-generation streetcar service in the United States.

The NS Line has since been extended to RiverPlace and the South Waterfront. Originally unnamed, it was designated the "North South Line" in September 2012 following the opening of the system’s second route, the Central Loop Line, later rebranded as the A and B Loop.

== History ==
=== Early planning ===
Planning for the restoration of streetcar services in downtown Portland, which had ceased operating in 1950, was considered as early as the 1970s, when businessman and philanthropist Bill Naito led an effort to convince downtown property owners to help build a vintage trolley line. In response to recommendations to develop a streetcar network by Portland's 1988 Central City Plan, a citizen-led advisory committee was established in 1990 that would convince the city to the conduct a feasibility study. Early plans envisioned three lines, with the first running up from John's Landing near the South Waterfront through downtown Portland to Northwest 23rd Avenue in the Northwest District. This proposed line, initially referred to as "Central City Trolley", was predicted to run replicas of cars that once served Council Crest. Project supporters and planners later renamed it the "Central City Streetcar", after opting instead to employ modern, low-floor trams in the hopes that it would be seen as a transit system rather than a tourist attraction.

Several alternative routes were considered in downtown, including the Portland Transit Mall on 5th and 6th avenues, as well as Park and 9th avenues. Both routes were rejected by nearby neighborhood associations. In January 1994, the Portland City Council adopted a route between Legacy Good Samaritan Medical Center on Northwest 23rd Avenue and PSU via 10th and 11th avenues, and the following year, called for bids to design, build, and operate the service. The nonprofit Portland Streetcar, Inc., which consisted of leaders from the city's businesses and public institutions, was the only firm to respond to the bid request.

=== Funding and construction ===
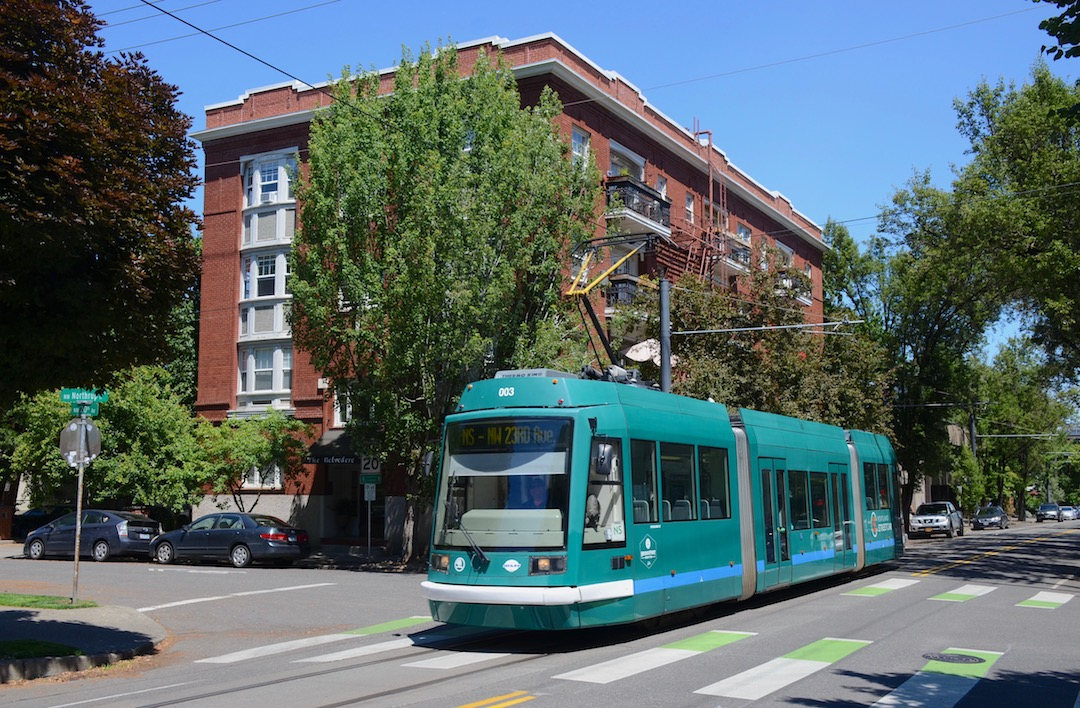
One of the five streetcars that opened the line in 2001, seen westbound on Northwest Northrup Street in 2019

The city council authorized the streetcar project in July 1997. The cost of the project amounted to $56.9 million (equivalent to $98.7 million in 2025 dollars), with the city covering the largest share. City parking bonds provided most of the city's contribution at $28.6 million. In September 1998, the city council created a local improvement district to collect funding from properties situated within two blocks of the streetcar alignment, providing $9.6 million. The Portland Development Commission redistributed $7.5 million in tax increment funds from the South Park Blocks urban renewal area that had been earmarked for TriMet's cancelled South/North Corridor project; this was used to extend the streetcar route through the PSU campus to Southwest 5th Avenue. Only $5 million came from the Federal Transit Administration for construction, reallocated from TriMet to the city in exchange for a system giving TriMet buses transit signal priority. Procurement and installation of tracks and wiring and the construction of a maintenance barn beneath the Fremont Bridge were estimated at $28.2 million and $4 million, respectively. In 1999, Czech manufacturer Škoda was selected to provide the line's first five streetcars, valued at $12 million. The streetcar order was expanded to seven in 2001 to provide enough cars for a planned extension of the line from PSU to RiverPlace.

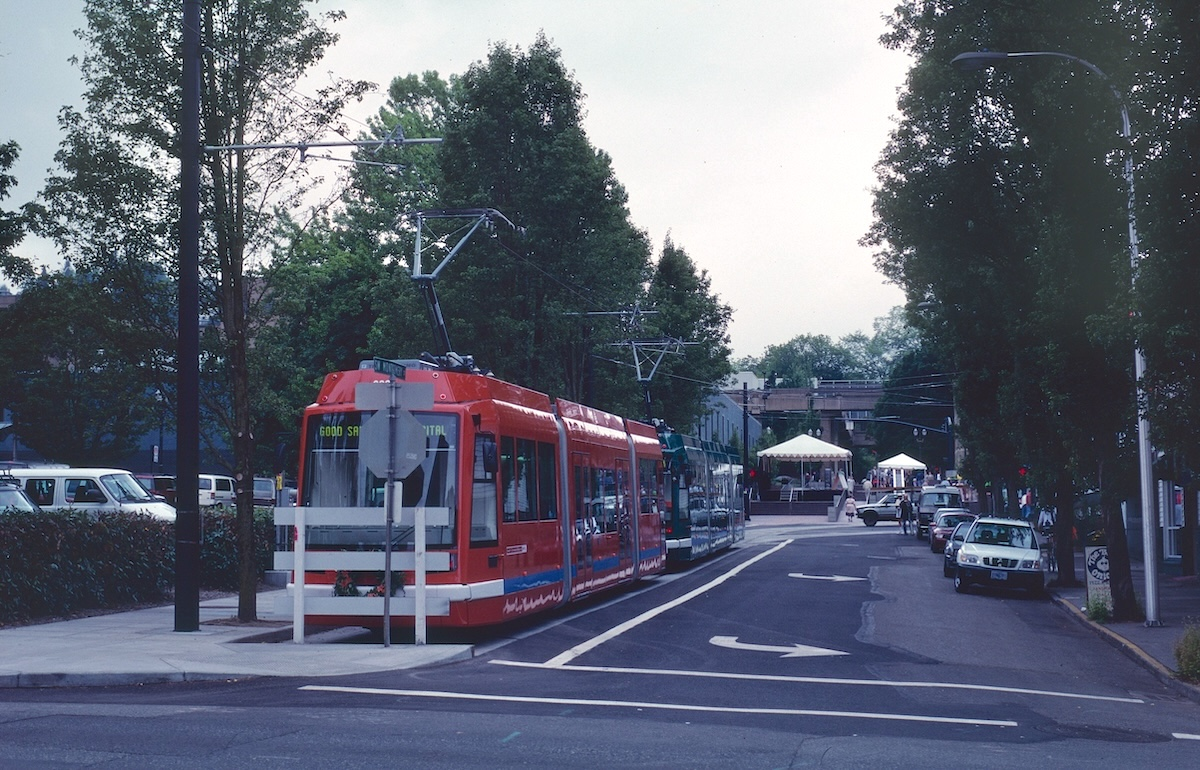
For the line's first four years, the track at PSU dead-ended on Montgomery Street at 4th Avenue.

Construction of the Central City Streetcar began on April 5, 1999, marked by a groundbreaking ceremony. Crews from Stacy Witbeck started utilities relocation work along Northwest Lovejoy Street that same day; relocation work on 10th and 11th avenues followed in June. Track-laying occurred one week after the start of roadway demolition and progressed southward through downtown. Workers reached the PSU campus in June 2000, by the time university officials resolved the alignment of the tracks, placing the northbound segment diagonally though the newly built Urban Plaza and the southbound segment along the northern end of the campus. Construction of the extension began in late July 2000. Although the last passenger stop would be on 5th Avenue at Southwest Montgomery Street, the track would end on Montgomery Street at 4th Avenue, with a short section of two-way single track between 4th and 5th avenues in which the bi-directional streetcars would reverse directions at the end of each southbound trip and spend any scheduled layover time. The 7,800-square-foot (720 m^{2}) maintenance barn that would house the streetcars was 90 percent complete by August.

Line testing commenced in January 2001 using one of two replica-vintage trolleys that would be transferred from TriMet's Portland Vintage Trolley for planned weekend use on the streetcar line. The project's completion, initially targeted for February, was pushed back to May due to delays in pole and power line installation. The delivery of the first streetcar, which had been expected in late February, was also delayed by the acquisition of a line-of-credit deal, established as a form of insurance in the event the cars did not work out. The first car finally arrived in April.

=== Opening and extension to South Waterfront ===
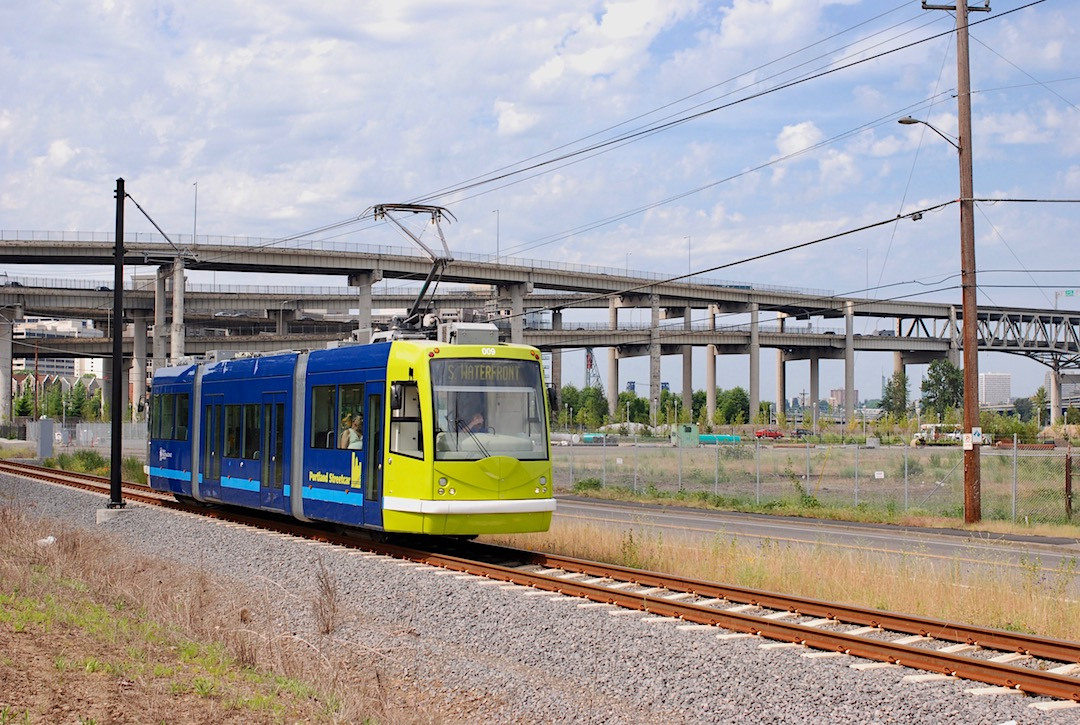
Car 009 next to Moody Avenue in 2007, before this single-track section was replaced by double-track in a realigned section of that street

The first 2.4 miles (3.9 km) of the Central City Streetcar, later renamed to "Portland Streetcar", opened on July 20, 2001, from Northwest 23rd Avenue to PSU. The line was notably the first "second-generation streetcar" system in the United States and Portland's first new streetcar service in fifty years. Opening day celebrations were held at various points along the line, and free rides were offered for three days. Four streetcars initially operated on weekdays, while three streetcars and one vintage trolley ran on weekends. The Portland Streetcar had recorded 6,000 to 8,000 daily riders by September 2001, exceeding 1996 projections of between 2,700 and 4,700 riders per day.

In 2004, construction began on a 0.6-mile (0.97 km) extension south from PSU to RiverPlace. It cost $16 million and opened on March 11, 2005. It extended the short length of two-way single-track operation along Southwest Montgomery Street onto Southwest 4th Avenue, making it about 450 feet (100 m) in length, equipped with signals for the streetcars to ensure that only one direction was in use at any given time. This segment also includes the steepest grade on the system, 8.75% in the block of Southwest Harrison Street between 1st and 2nd avenues. Another extension of 0.6 miles (0.97 km) south to the lower terminus of the Portland Aerial Tram on Southwest Gibbs Street in the South Waterfront opened on a temporary ballasted track on October 20, 2006. It was initially a bidirectional single track, operating on a right-of-way used until the end of 2003 by the Willamette Shore Trolley, a heritage streetcar that continues to operate between Portland and Lake Oswego. On August 17, 2007, an extension of the line south of Gibbs Street to Southwest Lowell and Bond opened to better serve the South Waterfront district. This 0.46-mile (0.7 km) extension is a 10-block loop, from Southwest Moody and Gibbs proceeding south on Moody Avenue, east on Lowell Street and north on Bond Avenue to OHSU Plaza at Gibbs. This final extension of the line cost $14.45 million. The extensions collectively increased the one-way length of the line to 4.06 miles (6.53 km).

On November 3, 2011, the streetcar line began using new double-track on a realigned section of Moody Avenue, which was built as part of the $66 million Moody multimodal project. Two stops—OHSU Plaza and Southwest Moody & Gibbs—were built directly adjacent to the entrance to the Portland Aerial Tram, linking the lower campus of Oregon Health & Science University (OHSU) to its campus atop Marquam Hill. These stations received a connection to the Lair Hill neighborhood that was otherwise cut off by Interstate 5 (I-5) with the opening of the Gibbs Street Pedestrian Bridge on July 14, 2012. Until 2012, the north–south streetcar line had no route name, being referred to only as the Portland Streetcar line, because it was the only line in the system. However, with the opening of the system's second line on September 22, 2012, the original line was designated the North South Line (abbreviated as NS Line) to distinguish it from the newly built Central Loop line (CL Line), later renamed A and B Loop.

=== Extension to Montgomery Park ===
On December 11, 2024, the Portland City Council approved the Montgomery Park extension, as a key component in a plan to transform the area near the planned new terminus from a mostly industrial area into a high-density residential district, with more than 2,000 new housing units. Most of the funding for the project has yet to be secured, but the approval clears the way for the city to apply for grants from federal and various regional and local sources. The extension will be served by the NS Line. It will be around 0.8 miles (1.3 km) long, and at the end of 2024, construction was forecast to begin in 2028, for opening in 2030, subject to securing of the needed funding and final approval of the plans. The exact route was finalized in December 2024. The extension will not be equipped with overhead wires, and only streetcars equipped with storage batteries allowing operation on battery power will be able to serve it. The fleet currently includes no such vehicles, but the city planned to buy 11 such streetcars. In spring 2026, the city announced its intention to purchase 15 new streetcars from CAF, all with batteries allowing some off-wire movement. Construction of the two-thirds-mile-long (1.3 miles round trip) extension is now projected to begin in 2029, for opening in 2031.

== Service ==
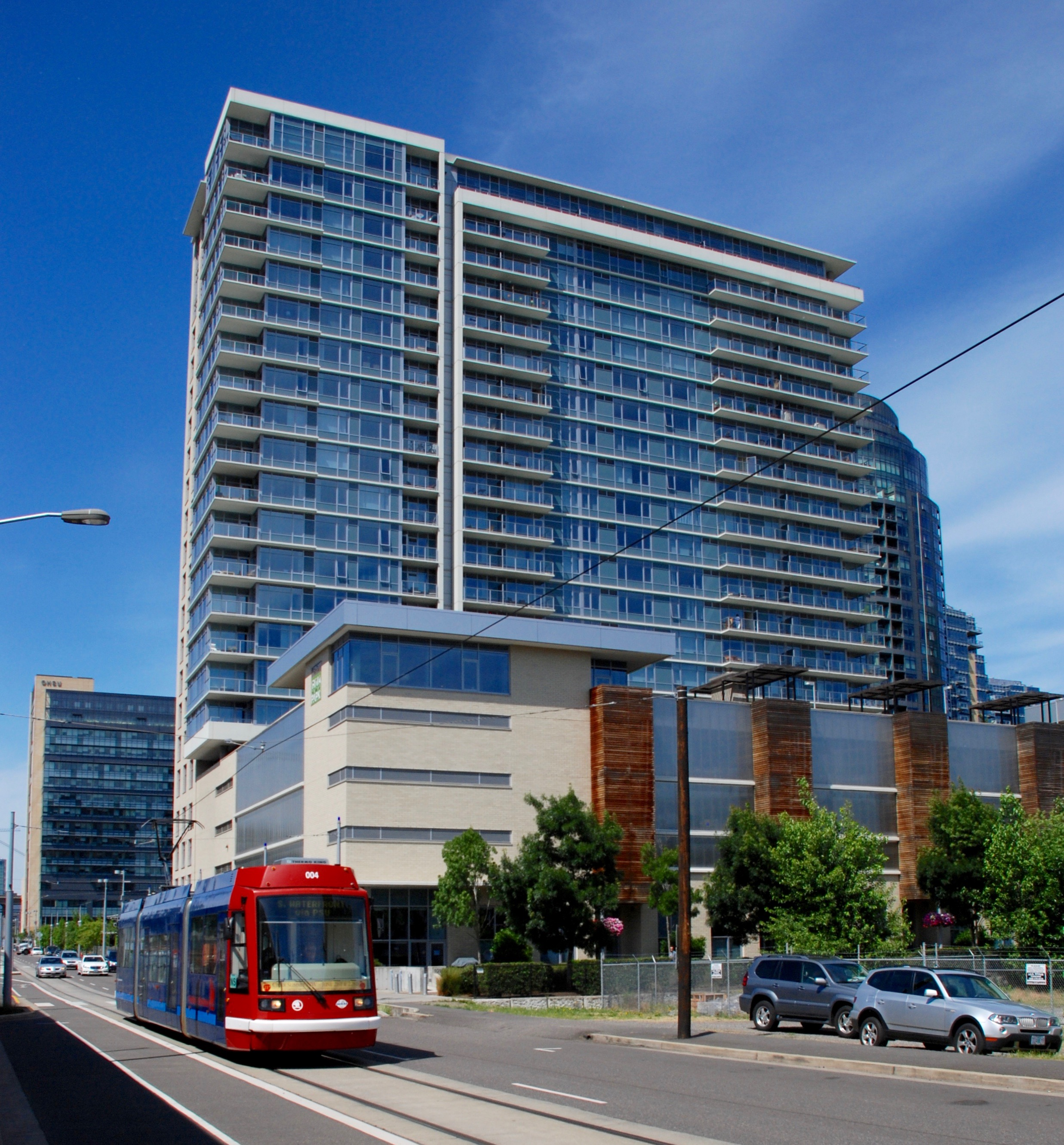
A streetcar in the South Waterfront in 2013

The NS Line runs for approximately 18 hours per day on weekdays, 16 hours on Saturdays, and 15 hours on Sundays. During weekdays, NS Line trains begin service at 5:45 am heading southbound from Northwest 23rd & Marshall station; the first northbound train departs Southwest Lowell & Bond station at around 6:27 am. Service begins later on weekends at approximately 7:24 am. End-to-end travel takes approximately 35 minutes. Headways run from as short as fifteen minutes between 10:00 am and 7:00 pm on weekdays and Saturdays to a maximum of 20 minutes for all other times. The final southbound train to run the full length of the line on weekdays departs from the northern end at 10:30 pm while the final northbound train departs the southern end at 11:15 pm. The last five trains on weekdays and Saturdays travel southbound from Northwest 23rd & Marshall and terminate at Northwest 18th & Lovejoy, with the last train arriving at 11:53 pm. On Sundays, service ceases earlier at 11:07 pm.

The NS Line is the busiest streetcar route, averaging 8,751 riders on weekdays in September 2018, before the COVID-19 pandemic contributed to a drop in ridership. The Portland Streetcar achieved a new system-wide record for average weekday ridership in April 2018, with the NS Line carrying 9,226 passengers.

=== Route ===
The NS Line is approximately 4.1 miles (6.6 km) long. Its northern terminus is Northwest 23rd & Marshall station in the Northwest District, which is situated on a turning loop near the intersection of Northwest 23rd Avenue and Northwest Marshall Street. Between Northwest 23rd and 10th avenues, the streetcar alignment follows an east–west direction and is split between Northwest Northrup and Lovejoy streets, where cars travel northbound and southbound, respectively. On Northwest 15th and 16th avenues, the line runs beneath Interstate 405 (I-405), passing the system's maintenance barn. It turns south on Northwest 10th and 11th avenues in the Pearl District and is joined by cars serving the Loop Service. On this segment, trains travel northbound on 10th Avenue and southbound on 11th Avenue, passing The Armory and Powell's City of Books. The line enters Southwest Portland and upon traversing West Burnside Street. It crosses the Blue Line and Red Line tracks of MAX Light Rail on Southwest Morrison and Yamhill streets. Just north of the PSU campus, the southbound alignment turns east onto Southwest Market Street and south onto Southwest 5th Avenue, while the northbound segment turns east onto Southwest Mill Street and travels diagonally through PSU's Urban Plaza.

The NS Line includes a short section of bidirectional single-track, only about nine feet (2–3 meters) long (but about 100 feet in operational terms), on Southwest Montgomery Street just east of Southwest 5th Avenue before the line turns south onto Southwest 4th Avenue. The section along the latter street was also single-track originally (when opened in 2005), until being doubled in 2014., The line travels for one block along 4th before turning onto Southwest Harrison Street. The line enters RiverPlace via Southwest River Parkway where it turns south onto Southwest Moody Avenue, running beneath the I-5 and I-405 interchange. After passing the OHSU Robertson Life Sciences Building, it crosses the MAX Orange Line tracks, which are joined by the Loop Service alignment for the Tilikum Crossing. The NS Line continues southward, traveling under the Ross Island Bridge as its northbound tracks split eastward onto Southwest Bond Avenue between the lower terminal of the Portland Aerial Tram and the OHSU Center for Health & Healing. The tracks proceed southward and join at the Southwest Lowell Street turning loop, which is occupied by the line's southern terminus, Southwest Lowell & Bond station.

A geographic map of the Portland Streetcar system: A Loop B Loop NS Line

=== Stations ===
The NS Line serves 39 stations, of which 24 are shared with the Loop Service. Each platform is equipped with a ticket vending machine, real-time display system, and line information signs. All stations are accessible to users with limited mobility. Connections to MAX Light Rail are available at five stops across the line and a connection to the Portland Aerial Tram, which links the South Waterfront and Marquam Hill campuses of OHSU, can be made at the Southwest Moody & Gibbs and OHSU Plaza stations.

In February 2016, four stations—Northwest 10th & Everett, Northwest 11th & Everett, Southwest 10th & Stark, and Southwest 1st & Harrison—were temporarily closed as part of a trial run to speed up travel times, particularly at stops that were prone to vehicular collisions. The following month, Portland Streetcar made the closures permanent, having reduced travel time through downtown by two minutes. Some decommissioned platforms were later converted into Biketown stations.

Key
Icon	Purpose
†	Terminus

List of NS Line stations
Station		Neighborhood	Connections and notes
Northbound	Southbound	Neighborhood	Connections and notes
—	NW 23rd & Marshall†	Northwest District	Serves Legacy Good Samaritan Medical Center
NW 22nd & Northrup	NW 22nd & Lovejoy	Northwest District	Serves Legacy Good Samaritan Medical Center
NW 21st & Northrup	NW 21st & Lovejoy	Northwest District	Serves Legacy Good Samaritan Medical Center
NW 18th & Northrup	NW 18th & Lovejoy	Northwest District	—
NW 14th & Northrup	NW 13th & Lovejoy	Pearl District	—
NW 12th & Northrup	—	Pearl District	—
NW 10th & Northrup	—	Pearl District	Portland Streetcar: B
NW 10th & Johnson	NW 11th & Johnson	Pearl District	Portland Streetcar: A B
NW 10th & Glisan	NW 11th & Glisan	Pearl District	Portland Streetcar: A B
NW 10th & Couch	NW 11th & Couch	Pearl District	Portland Streetcar: A B; Serves The Armory
SW 10th & Alder	SW 11th & Alder	Downtown	Portland Streetcar: A B
Central Library	SW 11th & Taylor	Downtown	Portland Streetcar: A B; MAX Light Rail: Blue Line, Red Line; Serves Central Library
Art Museum	SW 11th & Jefferson	Downtown	Portland Streetcar: A B; Serves Portland Art Museum
SW 10th & Clay	SW 11th & Clay	Downtown	Portland Streetcar: A B
SW Park & Mill	SW Park & Market	Downtown	Portland Streetcar: A B
—	SW 5th & Market	Downtown	Portland Streetcar: A B; Serves Portland State University
PSU Urban Center	SW 5th & Montgomery	Downtown	Portland Streetcar: A B; MAX Light Rail: Orange Line, Yellow Line; Frequent Express; Serves Portland State University
SW 3rd & Harrison		Downtown	Portland Streetcar: A B
SW Harrison Street		Downtown	Portland Streetcar: A B
S River Parkway & Moody		Downtown	Portland Streetcar: A B
S Moody & Meade		South Waterfront	Portland Streetcar: A B; MAX Light Rail: Orange Line; Frequent Express; Serves OHSU Robertson Life Sciences Building, Tilikum Crossing
OHSU Plaza	S Moody & Gibbs	South Waterfront	Portland Aerial Tram; Serves OHSU Center for Health & Healing
S Bond & Lane	S Moody & Gaines	South Waterfront	—
S Lowell & Bond†	—	South Waterfront	—

Images of NS Line stations
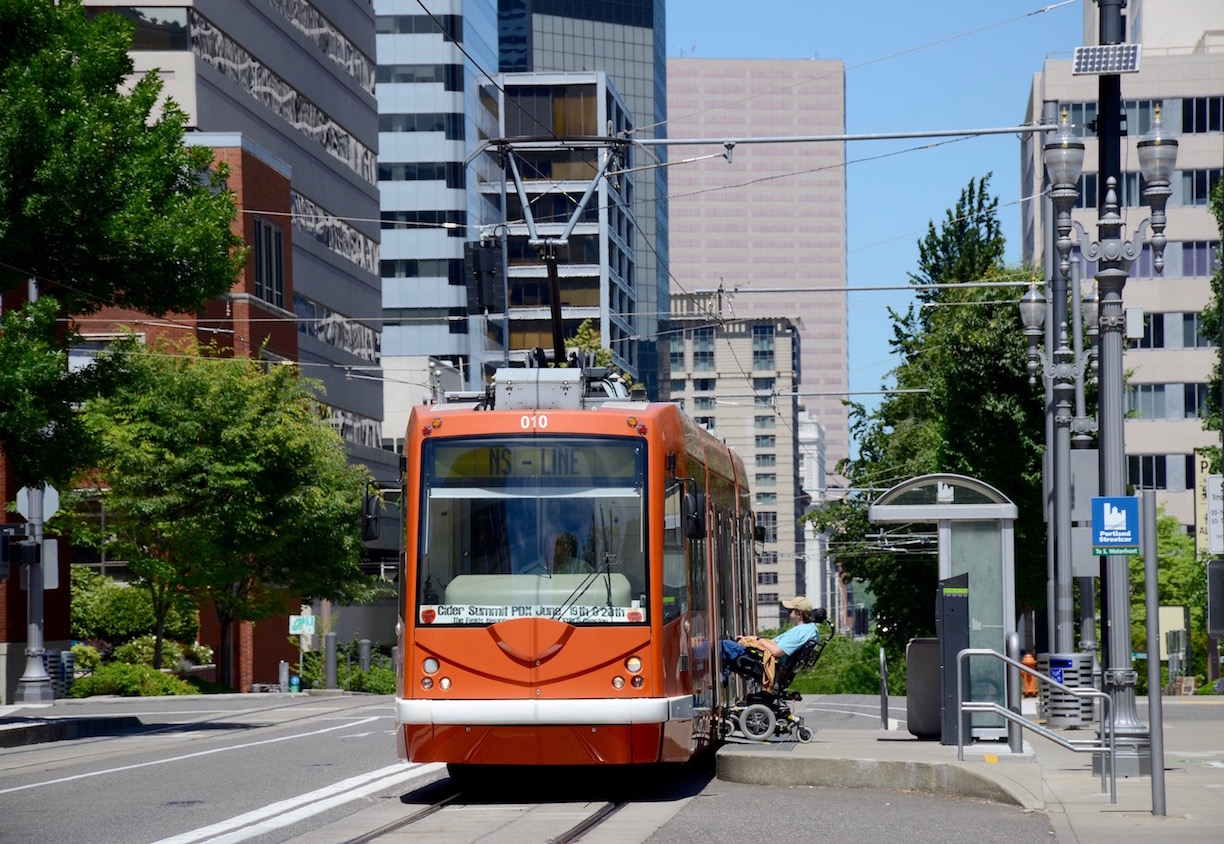
SW 5th & Montgomery station

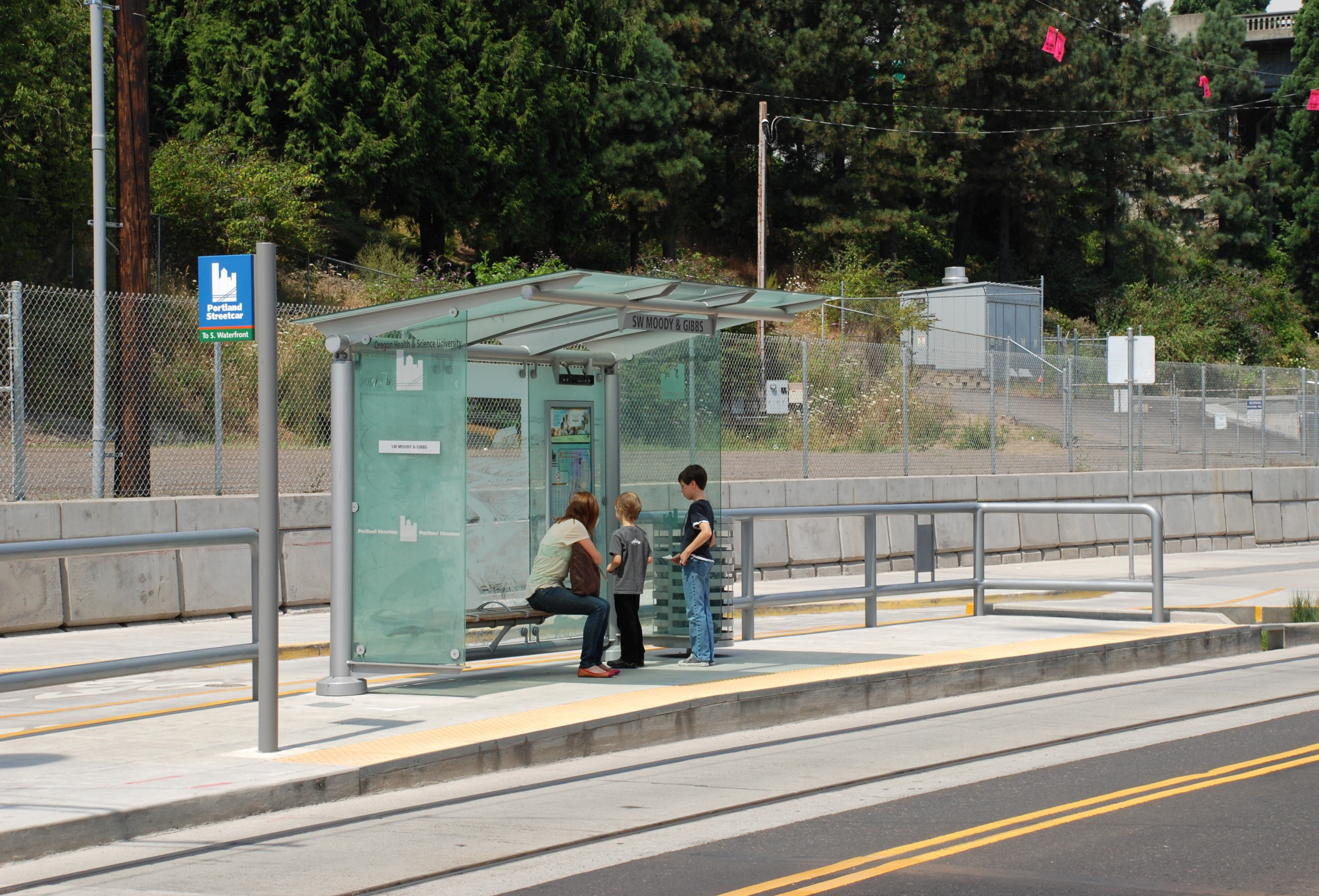
S Moody & Gibbs station

=== Former Vintage Trolley service ===
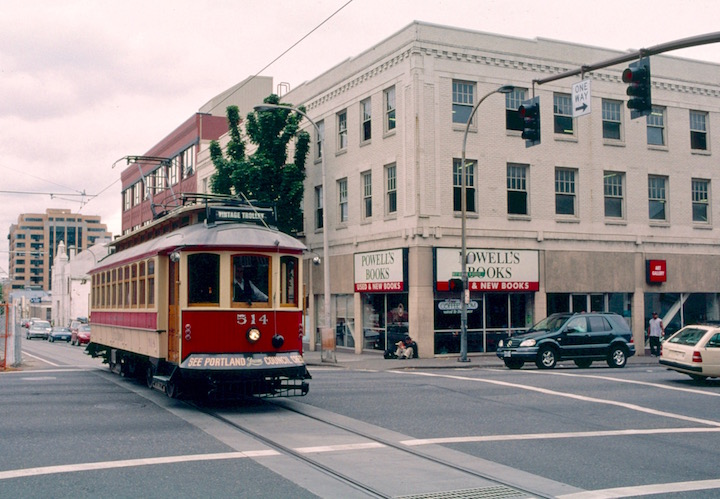
A replica-vintage trolley running along Portland Streetcar tracks in 2001

From 2001 to 2005, Portland Vintage Trolley service operated on what is now the NS Line on most weekends. Of four replica 1904 Brill streetcars owned by TriMet and in use on the MAX Light Rail system between 1991 and 2014, two were transferred to the city for use on the Portland Streetcar line. The service operated on Saturdays and Sundays, using one car at a time, from approximately 10:00 am to 6:00 pm, on regularly scheduled trips that otherwise would be operated by a modern Škoda car. They were non-wheelchair accessible.

Vintage Trolley service on the Portland Streetcar was temporarily suspended near the end of November 2005, in part due to maintenance problems with the two cars, and because the opening of the extension from PSU to RiverPlace in March 2005 caused operations difficulties with the faux-vintage trolley cars. The Vintage Trolley service, which resumed in May 2005 after a five-month suspension for repair work on the two cars, continued to end at PSU (5th and Montgomery), not serving the section to RiverPlace – thereby continuing to stop and reverse directions on Montgomery Street, while other streetcars needed to pass through that single-track section without stopping, because it was no longer their terminus. The late-2005 suspension eventually became permanent; the two Vintage Trolley cars were transferred back to TriMet, which transferred them over to the Willamette Shore Trolley in 2013.
