= CHH =

CHH may refer to:

- Chachapoyas Airport
- Hainan Airlines, ICAO code CHH
- Cabell Huntington Hospital, Huntington, West Virginia
- Cartilage–hair hypoplasia
- OHSU Center for Health & Healing, in Portland, Oregon, U.S.
- Cheswick and Harmar Railroad, a 20th-century defunct railroad in Pennsylvania
- Choi Hung station, Hong Kong; MTR station code CHH
- Chh (trigraph), a trigraph used in romanizations of Indic languages
- Christian hip hop
- Christ's Hospital railway station, West Sussex, England; National Rail station code CHH
