= Urban Center =

Urban Center may refer to:

- Urban center, human settlement with a high population density and infrastructure of built environment
- Urban Center Plaza, plaza on the Portland State University campus in Portland, Oregon, United States
- Urban Center (gallery), non-profit membership organization for preservation in New York City, United States

== See also ==
- Urban area
