= OHSU Center for Health & Healing =

Medical facility in Portland, Oregon

OHSU Center for Health & Healing Campus
- The first CHH building, at right, and the Rood Family Pavilion (foreground) and CHH2 building at left, in 2019

- Location within Portland, Oregon

General information
- Type: Medical facility
- Location: 3303 Southwest Bond Avenue; Portland, Oregon
- Coordinates: 45.4988°N 122.6713°W
- Completed: Building 1: 2006; Building 2: 2019
- Cost: Building 1: $140 million; Building 2 and Rood Pavilion: $340 million
- Owner: Oregon Health & Science University
- Operator: CB Richard Ellis

Technical details
- Floor count: 16 (Building 1); 15 (Building 2)
- Floor area: Building 1: 412,000 sq ft (38,300 m^{2}); Building 2: 360,000 sq ft (33,000 m^{2})

Design and construction
- Architects: Building 1: GBD Architects; Building 2: ZGF Architects
- Developer: Gerding Edlen
- Main contractor: Hoffman Construction (both buildings)

Website
- www.ohsu.edu/visit/center-health-healing-building-1 www.ohsu.edu/visit/center-health-healing-building-2

OHSU Center
Public transit services
| Preceding station | Portland Streetcar | Following station |
|---|---|---|
South Moody & Meade
| South Moody & Meade towards Northwest 23rd & Marshall | NS Line | South Bond & Lane; One-way operation |
| Preceding station | Portland Aerial Tram | Following station |
South Waterfront
| Marquam Hill; Upper terminal | Portland Aerial Tram | Lower terminal |
Location

Oregon Health & Science University's (OHSU) Center for Health & Healing (CHH) is a two-building medical complex in the South Waterfront district of Portland, Oregon. The 16-story, 412,000-square-foot (38,300 m^{2}) first building opened in 2006, and the adjoining, 15-story second building – sometimes referred to as CHH2 – with 360,000 sq ft (33,000 m^{2}) of space opened in 2019. The complex is connected to the main OHSU campus on Marquam Hill by the Portland Aerial Tram.

== History ==
The first building of the OHSU Center for Health & Healing was completed in 2006, designed by GBD Architects and constructed by Hoffman Construction. It took three years to complete, with construction beginning in 2003, and cost a total of $140 million.

Of the first building's 16 floors, eight floors are dedicated to physician practice, surgery, and imaging; three floors house the March Wellness Fitness Center; four are home to education and research facilities; and the ground level contains an optical shop, a pharmacy, and a café. The building is 61.58 m (202.0 ft) tall.

Construction of a second building began in 2016, and the 15-story Center for Health & Healing Building 2 (CHH2) opened in March 2019 (to employees, and on April 8 to patients). Like the first building, it was constructed by Hoffman Construction; however, it was designed by ZGF Architects. A street separates the two buildings at ground level, but a two-story skybridge connects them. Built concurrently and also opened in early 2019 is a 10-story building, situated across Bond Avenue from CHH2, named the Gary and Christine Rood Family Pavilion, which serves as a residential facility for temporary stays by family members of patients receiving treatment at CHH. The combined budget for CHH2 and the Rood Family Pavilion was $360 million. A private donation of $12 million by the Roods help fund construction of the pavilion.

== Gallery ==
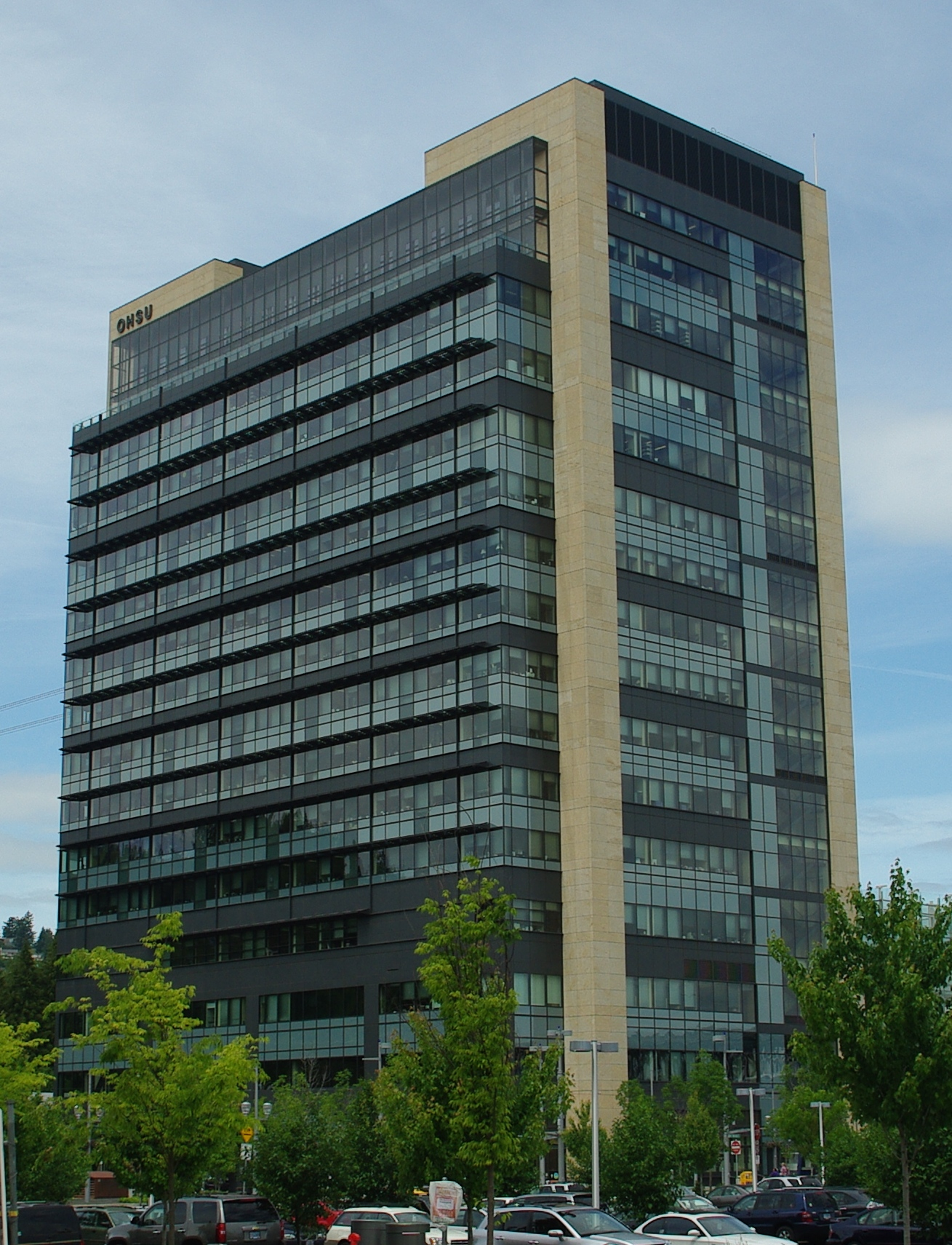
The OHSU Center for Health & Healing in 2009, when it consisted of a single building

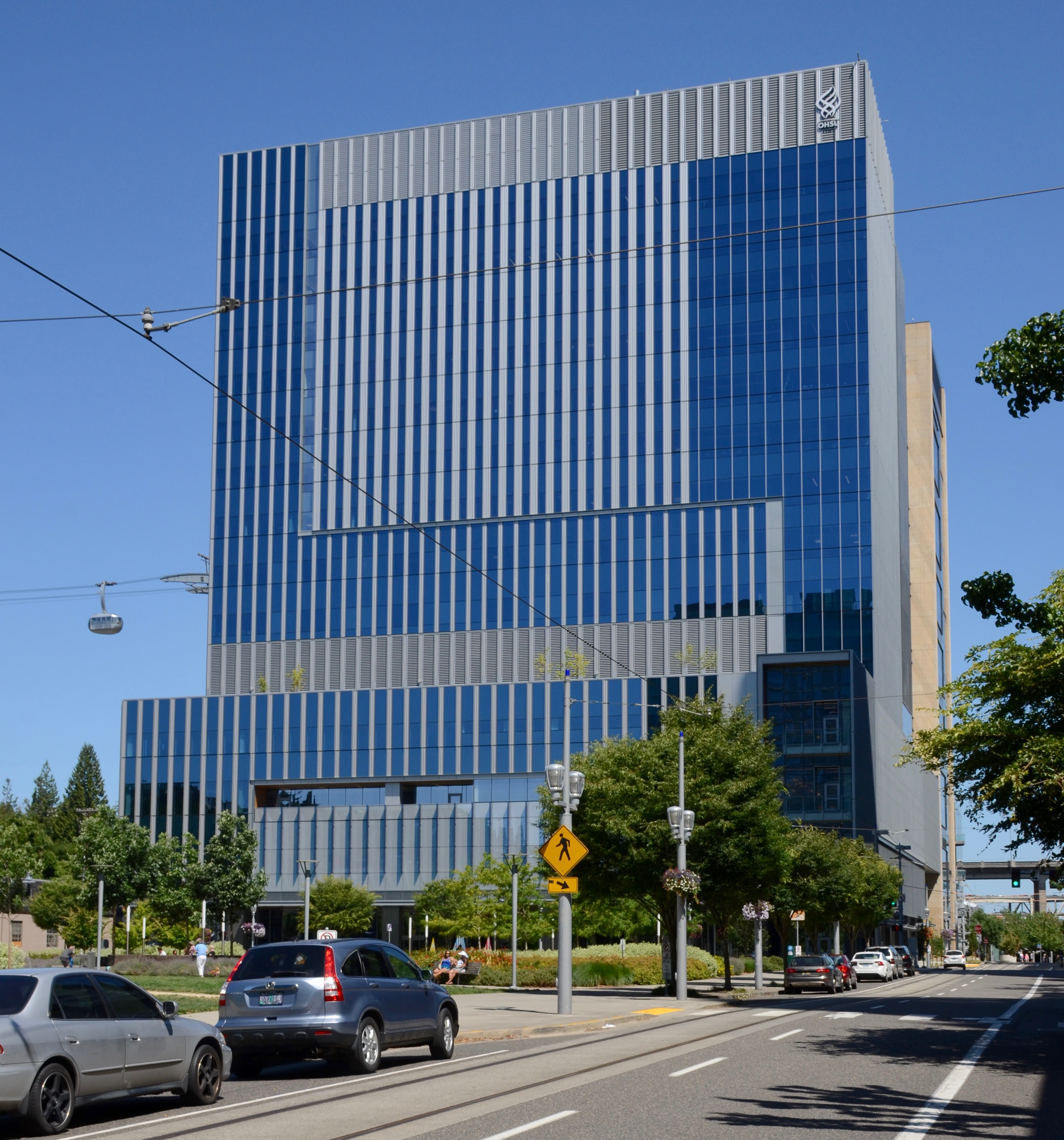
The 2016-opened second building viewed from the south, with Portland Aerial Tram in background

Two-story skybridge connecting the two main buildings (with the older building in background)

== See also ==
- Architecture of Portland, Oregon
- List of hospitals in Portland, Oregon
