= Urban Plaza =

Plaza on the Portland State University campus, in the U.S. state of Oregon

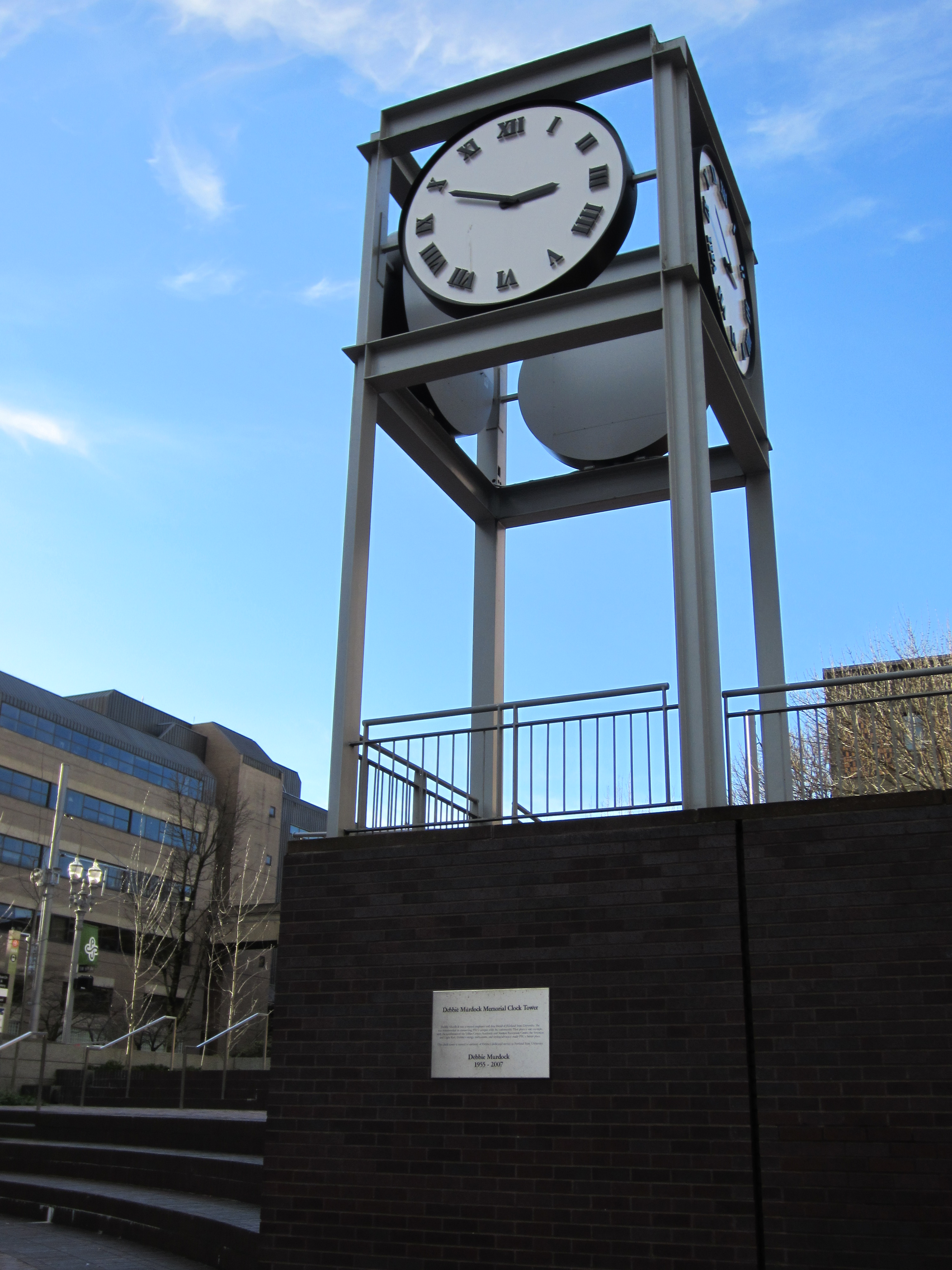
- The plaza's Debbie Murdock Memorial Clock Tower, 2012
- Location: Portland, Oregon, U.S.
- Location within Portland, Oregon
- Coordinates: 45.51188°N 122.68191°W

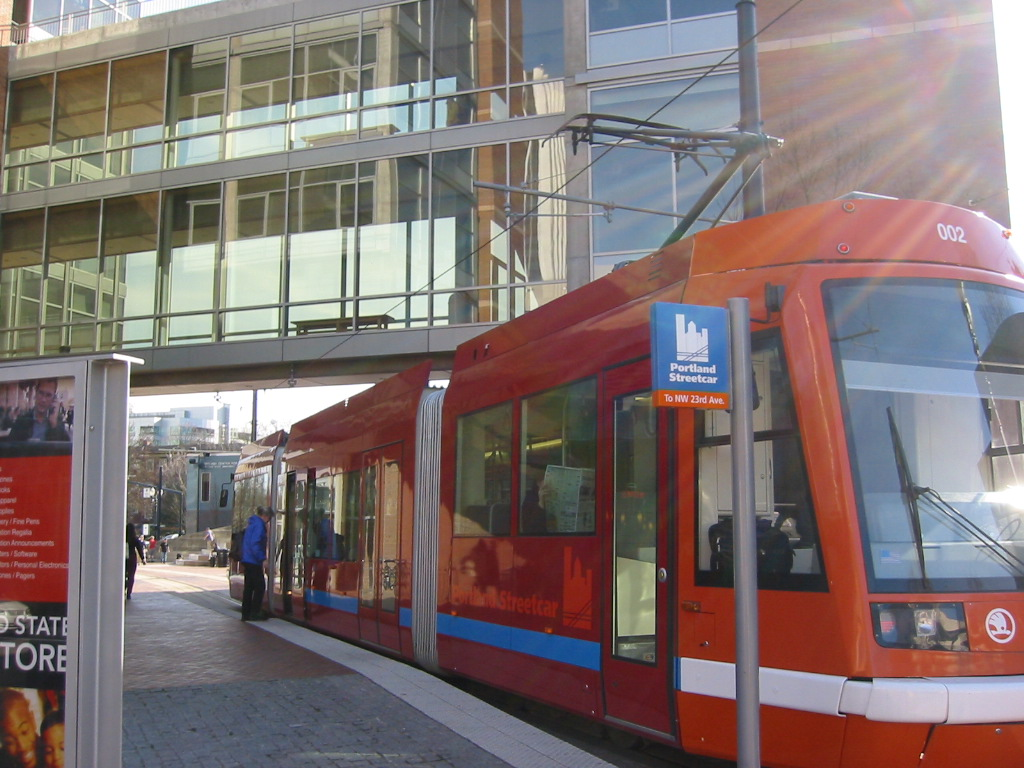
Portland Streetcar at the Urban Plaza Station

Urban Plaza, also known as the Urban Center Plaza, is a plaza on the Portland State University campus in Portland, Oregon, United States. It was designed by James Douglas "Doug" Macy and completed in March 2000.

== Description ==
The plaza features a clock tower, three fountains, a clock tower, and granite sculptures by John Aiken. The Portland Streetcar runs through the plaza.
