= Portland Streetcar =

Streetcar system in Portland, Oregon, opened 2001

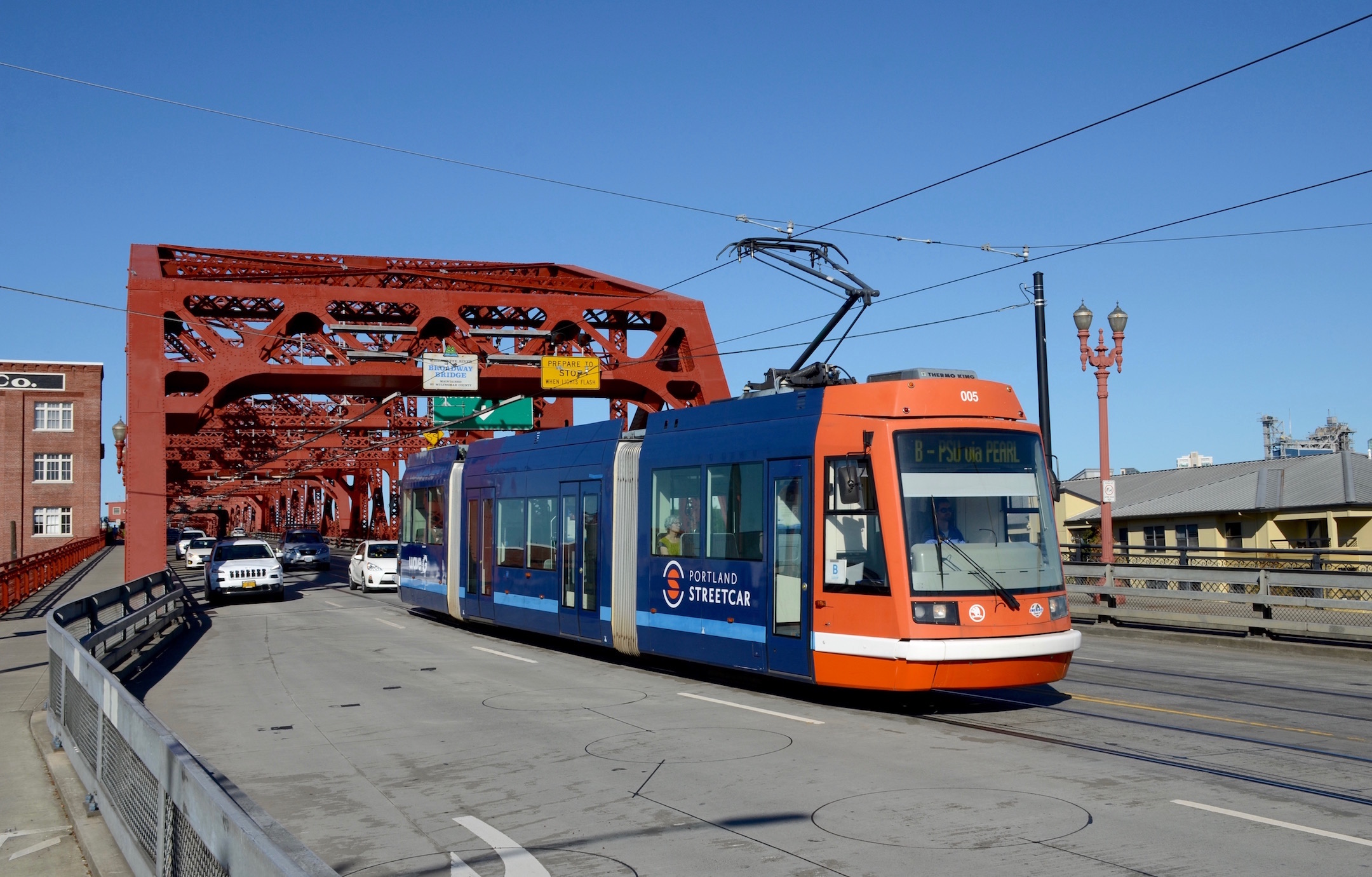
- A streetcar on the Broadway Bridge in 2016

Overview
- Owner: City of Portland
- Locale: Portland, Oregon, U.S.
- Transit type: Streetcar
- Number of lines: 3
- Daily ridership: 9,490 (weekdays) (August 2024)
- Annual ridership: 2.6 million (FY 2023)
- Website: portlandstreetcar.org

Operation
- Began operation: July 20, 2001; 25 years ago
- Operators: Portland Streetcar, Inc.; TriMet (maintenance and operators)
- Number of vehicles: 16 (3 in testing phase)

Technical
- System length: 7.2 mi (11.6 km)
- Track gauge: 4 ft 8 1/2 in (1,435 mm) standard gauge
- Electrification: Overhead line, 750 V DC
System map
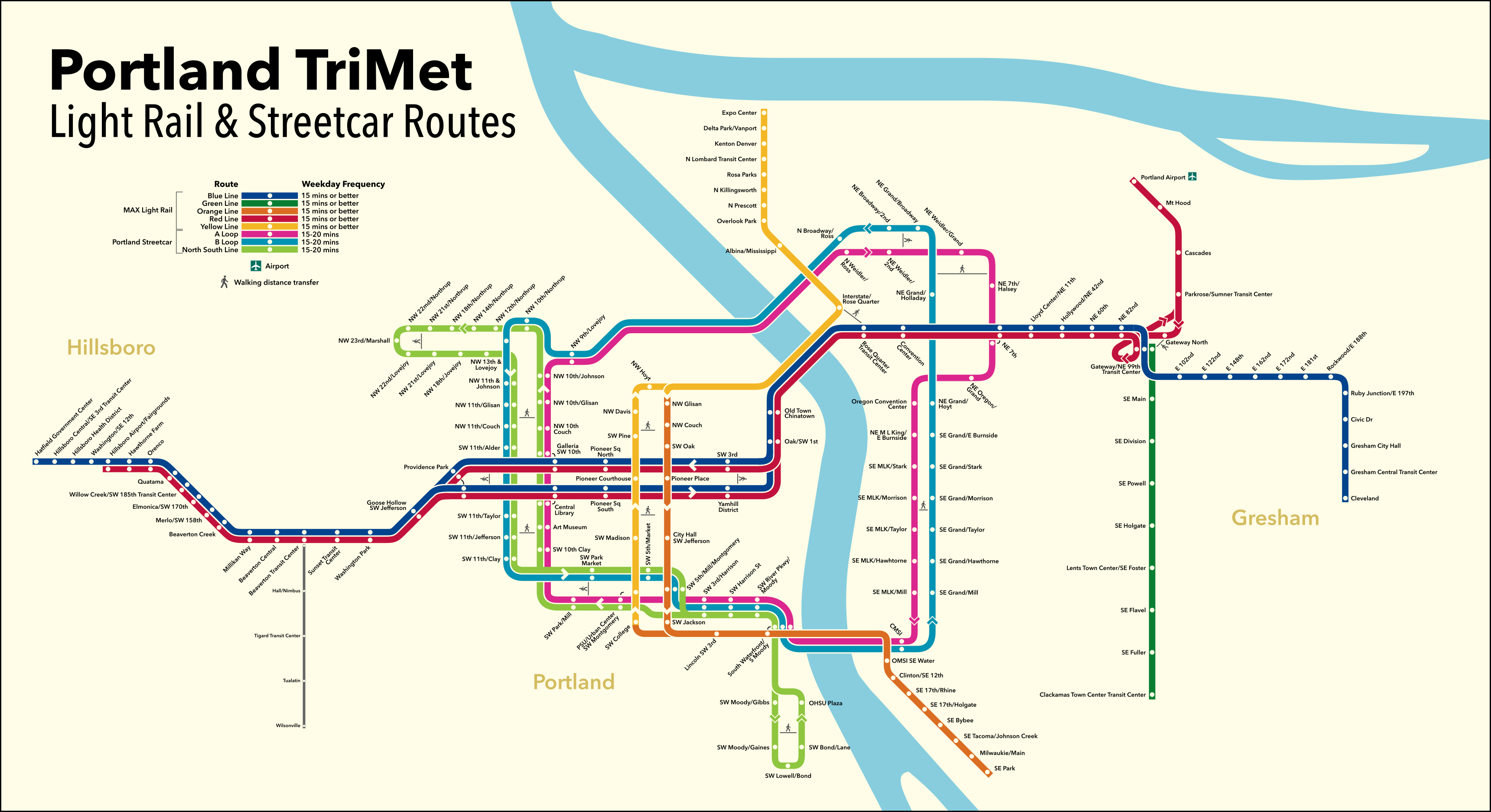
Portland Streetcar routes in relation to MAX Light Rail routes.

The Portland Streetcar is a streetcar system in Portland, Oregon, that opened in 2001 and serves areas surrounding downtown Portland. The 3.9-mile (6.3 km) NS Line runs from Northwest Portland to the South Waterfront via Downtown and the Pearl District. The Loop Service, which opened in September 2012 as the Central Loop (CL Line), runs from Downtown to the Oregon Museum of Science and Industry via the Pearl District, the Broadway Bridge across the Willamette River, the Lloyd District, and the Central Eastside Industrial District and added 3.3 miles (5.3 km) of route. In September 2015 the line was renamed as the Loop Service, with the A Loop traveling clockwise, and the B Loop traveling counterclockwise. The two-route system serves some 20,000 daily riders.

As with the heavier-duty MAX Light Rail network which serves the broader Portland metropolitan area, Portland Streetcars are operated and maintained by TriMet. But unlike MAX, the streetcar system is owned by the city of Portland and managed by Portland Streetcar Incorporated, a non-profit public benefit corporation whose board of directors report to the city's Bureau of Transportation.

Like some of Portland's original streetcar lines, redevelopment has been a major goal of the project. The Portland Streetcar is the first new streetcar system in the United States since World War II.

== Routes ==
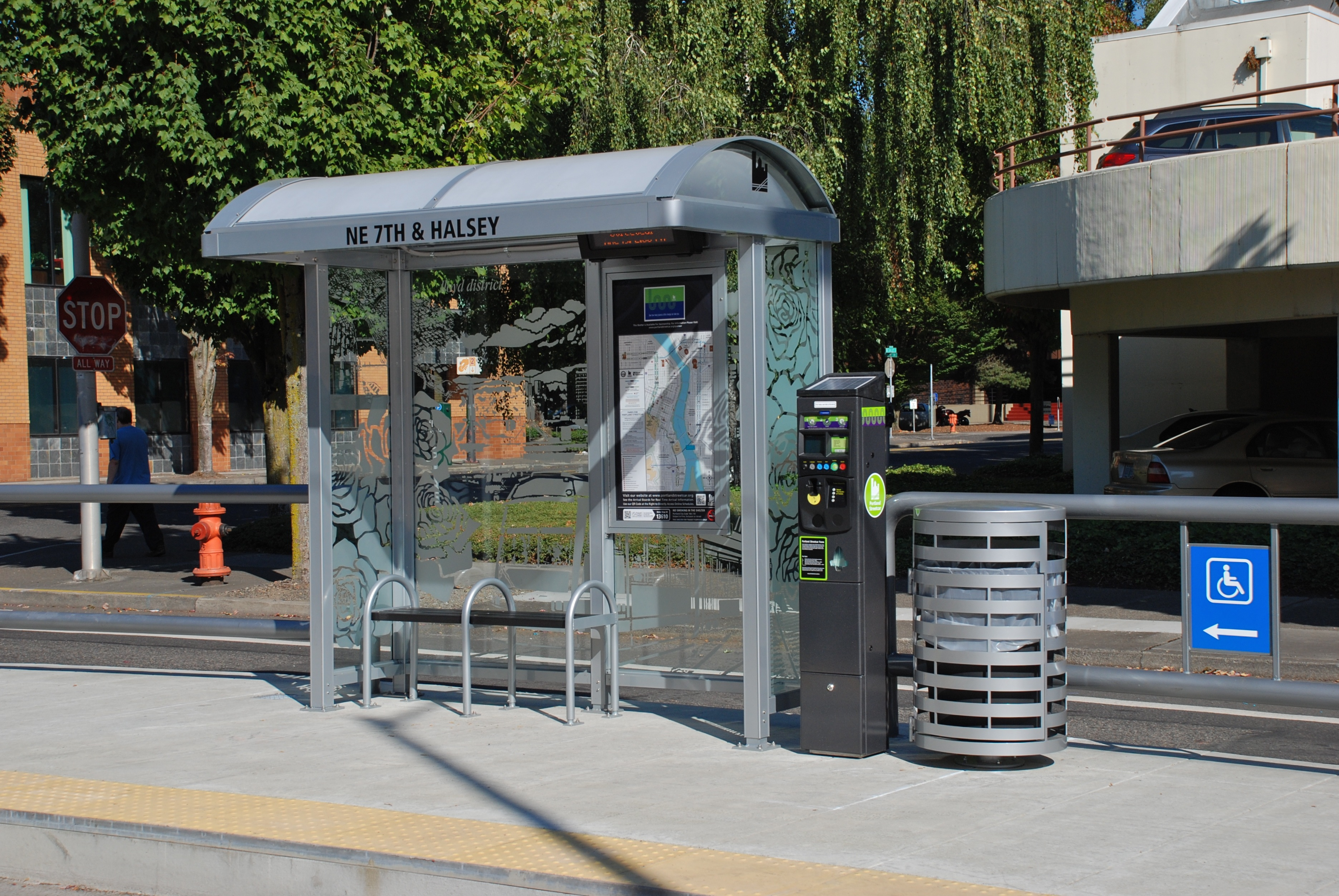
The amenities at each streetcar stop include a small shelter (with interior information display), ticket vending machine and trash can.

Since September 2012, the Portland Streetcar system has three services, which share a section along 10th and 11th Avenues in downtown, through the West End.

| Name | Commenced | Last extension | Stations | Length | Termini | |
|---|---|---|---|---|---|---|
| A Loop | September 22, 2012 (Note: The Loop Service was inaugurated as the Central Loop Line as was referred to this name until 2015.) | 2015 | 55 | 4.4 mi (7.1 km) | — | |
| B Loop | September 22, 2012 | 2015 | 55 | 4.4 mi (7.1 km) | — | |
| North South Line | July 20, 2001 | 2007 | 17 | 4.1 mi (6.6 km) | Northwest 23rd & Marshall | Southwest Lowell & Bond |

As of mid-2015, the two-line streetcar system measures 7.2 miles (11.6 km), measured in one direction only – not round-trip lengths – and counting only once the section served by both routes. The end-to-end length of the original route, now designated the "NS Line", is 3.9 miles (6.3 km) since 2007, and the 2012-opened "CL Line" added 3.3 miles (5.3 km). The total one-way length of the CL Line is 4.4 miles (7.1 km), for it shares 1.1 miles (1.8 km) of route along 10th and 11th Avenues in downtown with the NS Line.

Of the NS Line's 7.8-mile (12.6 km) round-trip length, 5.3 miles (8.5 km) are one-way operation along streets which are mostly also one-way and with the streetcars following parallel streets in opposite directions. The remaining 2.5 miles (4.0 km) of round-trip route length are sections where the NS streetcar route uses a single street (or private right-of-way) for both directions of travel. The CL Line, similarly, follows separate streets in opposite directions over most of its length. The only exceptions are a length of about 1,000 feet (300 m) near the OMSI terminus (mostly on a streetcar-only viaduct over the Union Pacific Railroad main line) and the route sections nearest to, and across, the Broadway Bridge. With the opening of the second line, the system now has 76 stops.

The steepest grade on the system is 8.75% in the block of SW Harrison Street between 1st and 2nd avenues, which since 2015 has been on a section of track used by both routes.

== Service ==
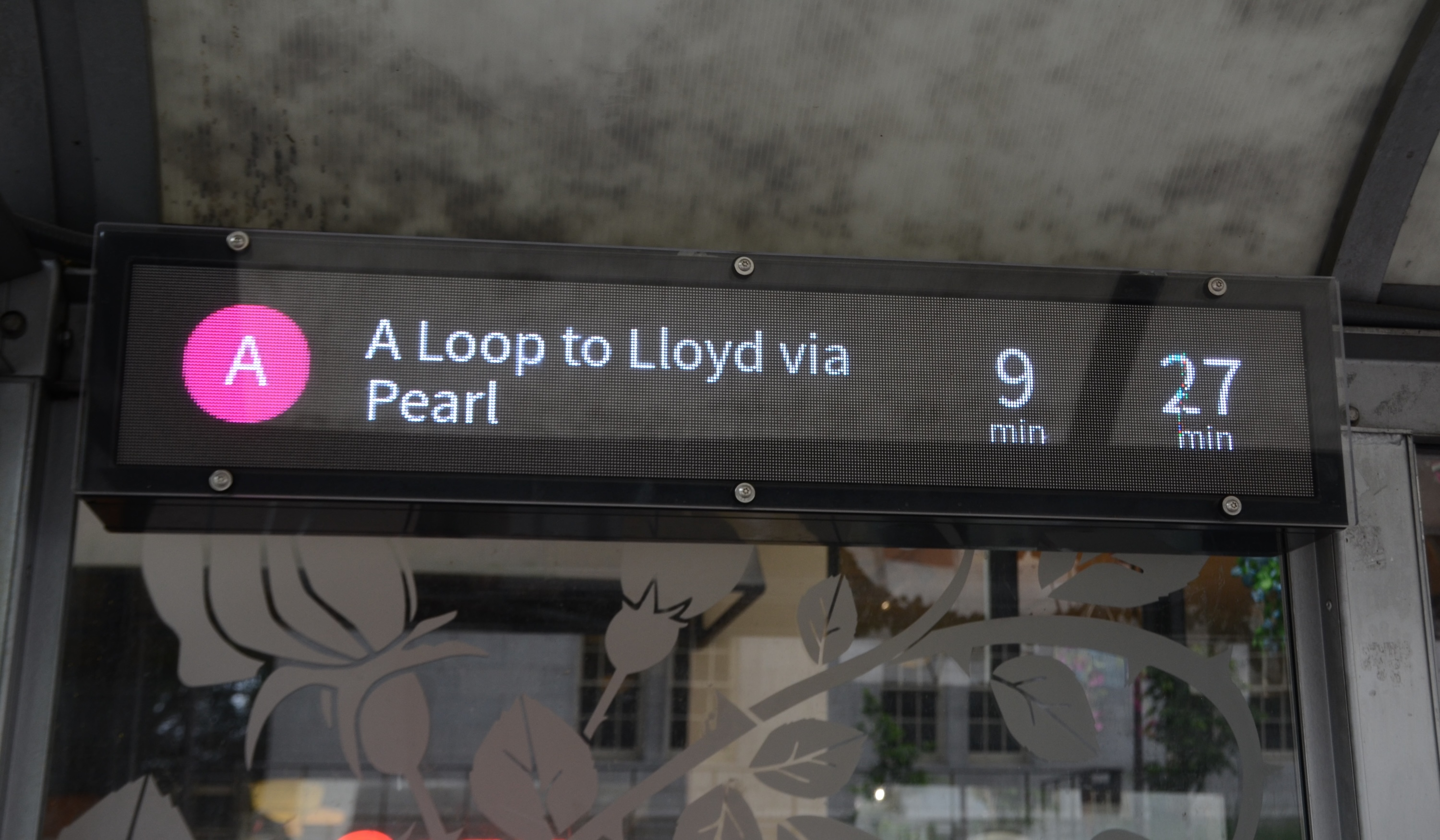
LED display at a streetcar stop, giving real-time schedule information

Streetcars are scheduled to arrive at 15-minute intervals at most times, with a 20-minute frequency in the evening and on Sundays. Every stop is fitted with an electronic reader board giving real-time arrival information to waiting passengers, using the NextBus vehicle tracking system. This was first brought into use on March 25, 2002.

As on TriMet's MAX line, the streetcar's fare system is a proof-of-payment (or "honor") system, with random inspections of passengers' fares, which minimizes wait times at stops by allowing boarding to take place simultaneously through all vehicle doorways. Streetcar operators do not collect or monitor fares. Although the line is not part of the TriMet system, the city honors TriMet's fares for the streetcar, for simplicity and convenience of transferring passengers. Streetcar-only fares are available, but are not valid on TriMet, unless using a Hop card, which will charge the difference in fare upon transferring.

The portion of the streetcar route within Downtown and the Pearl District of the streetcar route used to lie within TriMet's Fareless Square, later known as the Free Rail Zone. Rides within that area were free at all times. TriMet ended the Free Rail Zone on September 1, 2012.

Passengers not already in possession of a valid fare when boarding are required to use their credit/debit card on the hop card readers on board each Streetcar. Portland Streetcar used to have ticket machines on board but have since been removed and replaced with machines outside the Streetcar. Each vehicle also carries a ticket validator machine, for stamping "unvalidated" TriMet tickets purchased in advance. TriMet and Portland Streetcar have agreed to honor one another's fares, which means that TriMet passes, tickets and bus transfer receipts are accepted on the streetcar, and tickets purchased or validated on a streetcar are valid for travel on TriMet services (bus, MAX or WES Commuter Rail). To facilitate this, the ticket machines on board the streetcars and at streetcar stops sell TriMet tickets – covering both the streetcar fare and any TriMet rides the purchaser makes within the ticket's period of validity (2.5 hours or all day) – as well as streetcar-only tickets. For the same reason, prior to September 2012, the streetcar ticket machines offered all-zone (three-zone) and two-zone tickets, despite the fact that the streetcar system was located entirely within TriMet's Zone 1. TriMet tickets and transfers were valid all-day on the streetcar prior to that change, which also coincided with TriMet's elimination of the Free Rail Zone (Fareless Square). Since September 1, 2012, TriMet and Portland Streetcar tickets have an identical period of validity, of 2.5 hours (except for all-day tickets).

NS Line streetcars enter service on westbound tracks (at NW Northrup and 16th streets). Service starts at NW 23rd Avenue at Marshall. Yard-bound trains make their last stop at NW 18th Street and Lovejoy before entering yard via Lovejoy.

Loop Service streetcars enter service on eastbound tracks (at NW Lovejoy and 15th streets). Service starts at NW 9th Street and Lovejoy. Yard-bound trains make their last stop at NW 14th Street and Northrup (which is a NS Line stop) before entering yard via Northrup.

Portland Streetcar launched a new program in 2022 called Rider Ambassadors. They are groups of streetcar personnel who help people on board, give directions and connect people to resources, and help keep the riders safe. They ride the trains throughout the day and can be recognized by their purple vests

== Rolling stock ==
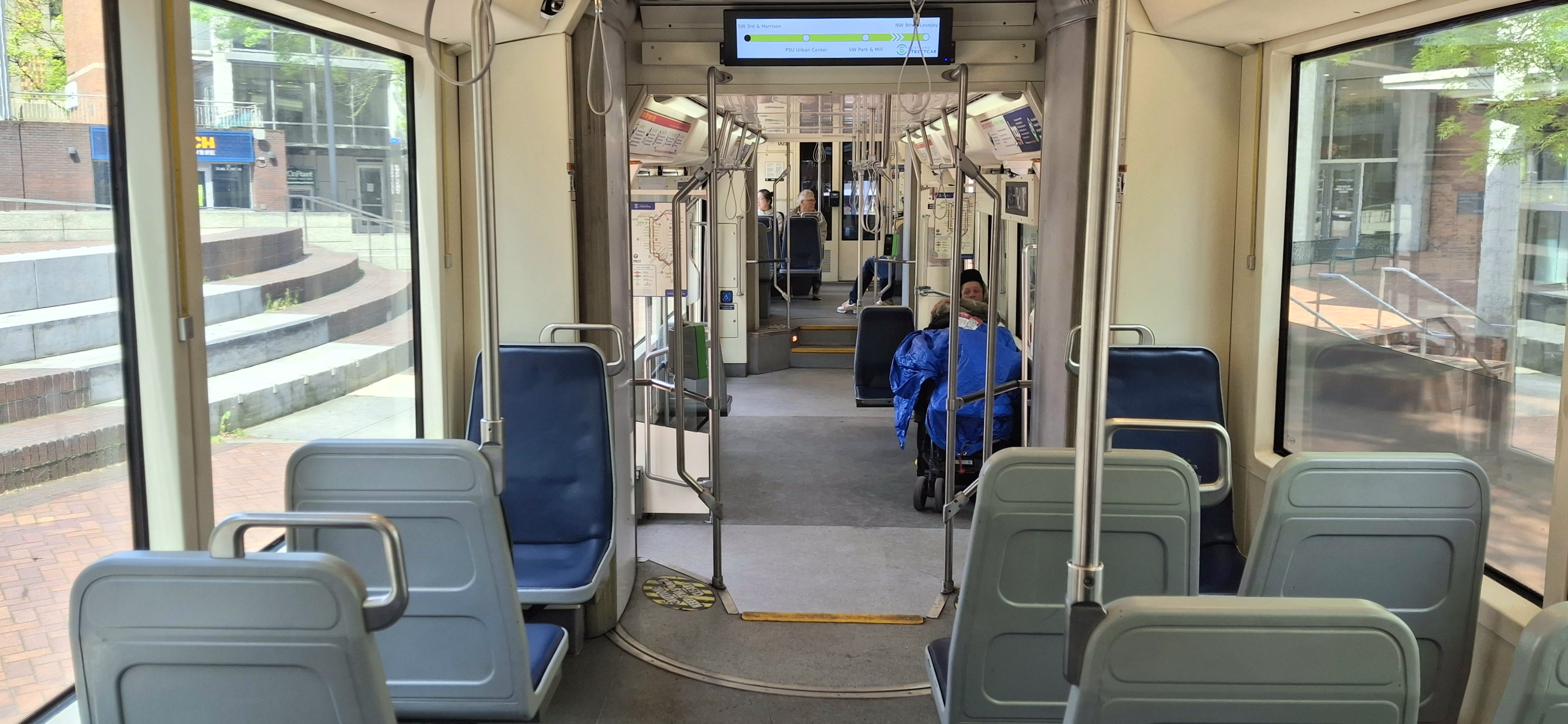
The inside of a Portland streetcar Škoda 10T

As of 2026, the system's active fleet includes 15 cars.

| Manufacturer | Model | Qty. | Year built | Fleet nos. | Notes |
Current fleet
| Škoda | 10T | 7 | 2001–02 | 001–007 | |
| Inekon Trams | Trio type 12 | 3 | 2006 | 008–010 | |
| United Streetcar | 100 | 5 | 2012–14 | 021–023, 025–026 | Originally six cars in series; no. 024 was retired following major accident damage from a 2023 collision. |
| Total | | | 15 | | |
Former fleet
| Gomaco | "Council Crest"; Brill replica | 2 | 1991 | 513–514 | Provided Vintage Trolley service on the Portland Streetcar line 2001–2005, weekends only |
| United Streetcar | 10T3 (prototype) | 1 | 2009 | 015 | |
| United Streetcar | 100 | 1 | 2013 | 024 | Retired by 2025 with major damage from a 2023 collision with a MAX light rail train. |
| Brookville Equipment | Liberty NXT | 3 | 2023 | 031–033 | Out of service pending implementation of a planned swap with Sound Transit's T Line fleet, in Tacoma, Washington, for three Skoda-Inekon 10T cars similar to Portland's 001–007 |

=== Current fleet ===
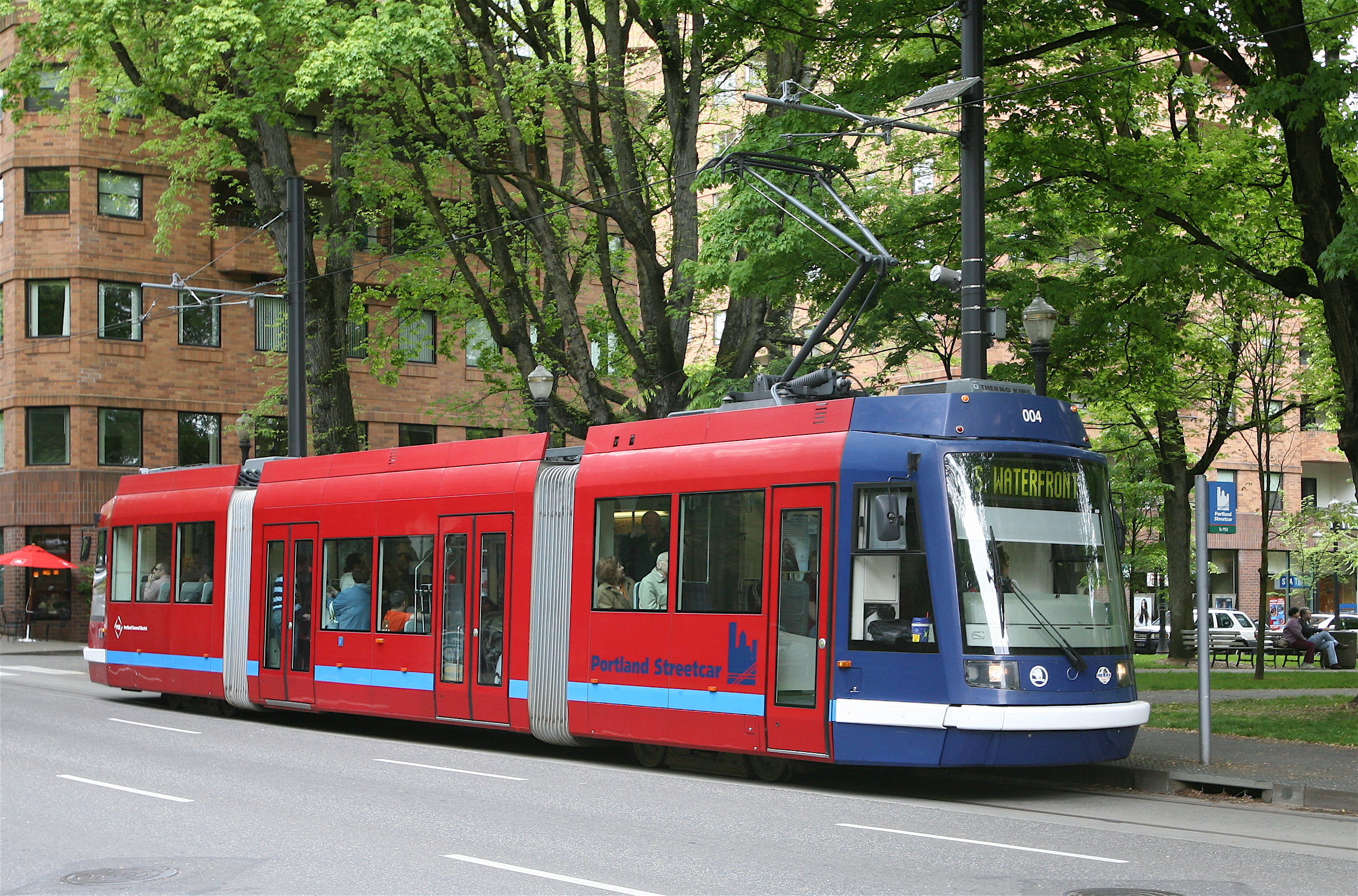
A streetcar at one of the stops serving Portland State University

The streetcars are a Czech design, and the first ten – which is all cars purchased before 2009 – were built in the Czech Republic and shipped to the United States complete. Streetcars added to the fleet after the first ten were built in the U.S. by United Streetcar, to basically the same design. All have a low-floor center section between the trucks, and at one door on each side they are equipped with a MAX-like bridge plate—a short ramp that extends from the vehicle doorway—to allow wheelchair access. Compared to MAX cars they are shorter and narrower, a result of having to run in mixed traffic on neighborhood streets, alongside parked automobiles. The cars are lighter than those used by MAX, allowing cheaper, less-intense track construction. Furthermore, couplers on the streetcars are hidden behind bumper skirts and only used to move disabled units back to the yard.

From spring 2007 until fall 2012, the serviceable fleet included ten streetcars. An 11th car was delivered in 2009 but did not enter service until September 2012 (see next section). The 11 cars were supplied in four batches between 2001 and 2009, built by any of three different manufacturers. However, they have nearly identical dimensions and are similar in all respects, since the design used for all eleven cars was developed by the same two Czech companies, Škoda and Inekon.

Cars 001 through 005 have been in operation since 2001, while cars 006 and 007 were added in 2002. These seven were built by a now-defunct joint venture between Škoda and Inekon, and are Škoda's 10T model, originally also called Astra 10T. Inekon performed most of the design work, while Škoda carried out the construction, in Plzeň.

Three additional cars, numbered 008–010, were ordered for the expansion of service to South Waterfront. By that time, the partnership between Inekon and Škoda had dissolved in an "ugly divorce", so these cars were constructed in Ostrava, Czech Republic, by a partnership of Inekon and the Ostrava city transit agency, Dopravní Podnik Ostrava. This partnership was originally named DPO-Inekon, but soon adopted the (English) name "Inekon Trams". Portland cars 008–010 are model 12-Trio (a particular version of Inekon's Trio series of streetcar designs) and have a high degree of spare parts compatibility with the existing fleet. They arrived in Portland in January 2007, and after a period of street testing, entered service in late May 2007.

=== U.S.-built streetcars ===
The next delivery, on May 15, 2009, was effectively another Škoda 10T, but built in the United States under license, rather than by Škoda itself. It entered service in September 2012.

Under a 2005 federal transportation bill, $4 million was allocated for construction of a U.S.-manufactured streetcar vehicle. Congressman Peter DeFazio indicated that the contract would go to Oregon Iron Works in Clackamas, Oregon, and that Portland would be permitted to keep the prototype vehicle permanently.

This special federal grant was intended to foster the creation of a domestic manufacturing industry for modern streetcars, which was non-existent at the time. This lack had forced streetcar systems to turn to overseas builders as the only source of the type of railcar needed. The first Portland Streetcar project had not used any federal funds. However, for any future streetcar projects desiring to obtain federal matching funds, among which were the planned future expansion in Portland, the vehicles would need to comply with the minimum 60% U.S. content provisions of the "Buy America" Act (49 U.S.C. § 5323j).

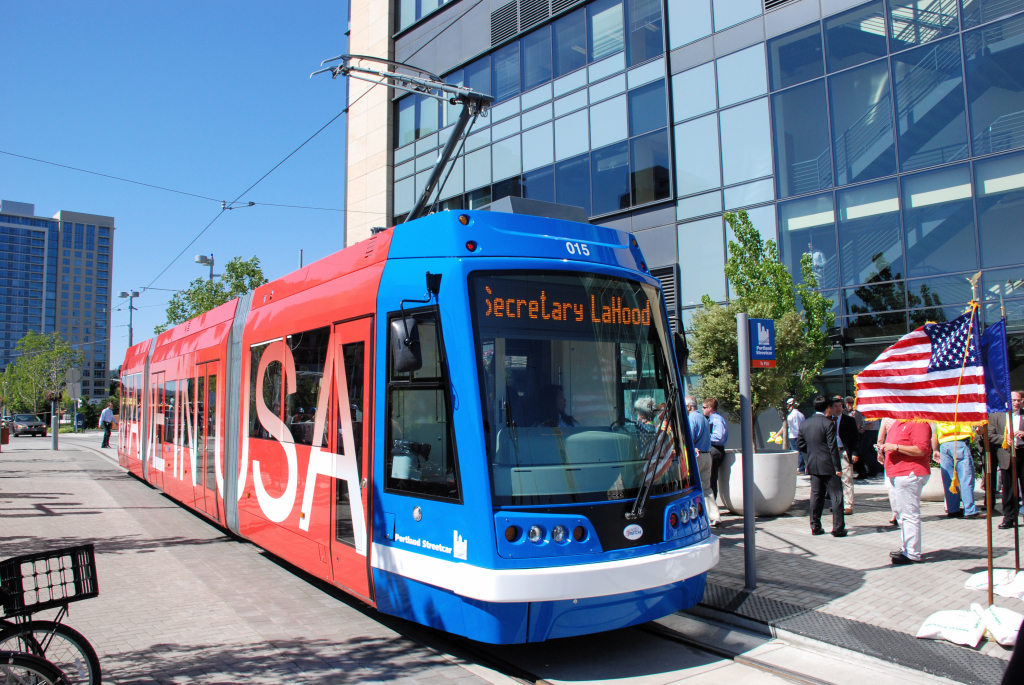
The 2009 prototype modern streetcar built in Oregon by United Streetcar, Portland's car 015

In February 2006, Škoda Transportation established an "exclusive technology transfer agreement" with Oregon Iron Works (OIW) to build streetcars meeting "Buy America" rules, and the two companies jointly prepared a detailed OIW submission when the city of Portland (owner of the Portland Streetcar system) issued a request for proposals in mid-2006 to build one new streetcar for the Portland Streetcar. In January 2007, OIW won a contract from Portland to build the prototype streetcar, to the Škoda design, and reported that it had established a new subsidiary, United Streetcar, to perform the work.

The United Streetcar prototype, number 015 in the Portland Streetcar fleet, was delivered on May 15, 2009, but did not enter service until 2012. The car is model 10T, the same as Škoda-built cars 001–007, but features a slightly modified end design. Although the differences are relatively minor, car 015 is considered to be model variant 10T3, whereas cars 001-005 were 10T0 and cars 006-007 were 10T2. Car 015, which carries a red, white and blue paint scheme and large "Made in USA" lettering along the sides, was presented to the public in a July 1, 2009, ceremony, at which Secretary Ray LaHood was the featured speaker.

Car 015's entry into service was delayed by more than three years, not finally occurring until September 2012. The main reason for the delay was a 2010 decision to replace its propulsion-control system – the electronic equipment which controls and coordinates the operation of the car's motors and other key operating components – with equipment made by Rockwell Automation, of Milwaukee, Wisconsin. Although the car was complete and operable in mid-2009, it had yet to undertake the extensive "acceptance testing" needed to certify that it was safe for passenger service and would run reliably. Car 015's propulsion control system was made by Škoda, whereas all 10 earlier Portland streetcars—even the seven cars built by Škoda—had control systems supplied by Elin EBG, an Austrian company (and only installed by Škoda). Acceptance testing began in late summer 2009, but revealed unspecified problems, and Škoda and Portland Streetcar were unable to reach agreement on resolving them. This issue, together with a desire by PS, United Streetcar and others to increase further the U.S. content of streetcars built by United Streetcar, led to discussions between Rockwell Automation and the various interested parties in Portland on the possibility and feasibility of Rockwell designing a control system for the United Streetcar design. In April 2010, the Federal Transit Administration (FTA) approved a $2.4-million grant, to be matched by $600,000 in local money, to fund the replacement of car 015's control equipment with new equipment to be designed by Rockwell Automation. Under FTA rules, the grant was made to TriMet (the region's primary transit agency), but TriMet only acted as intermediary in this instance, and it passed the funds along to the Portland Streetcar system's owner, the city of Portland, who administered the contract with Rockwell and the now-amended contract with Oregon Iron Works/United Streetcar. The change was expected to increase the overall U.S. content of the car from around 70% to around 90%, and this helped win the support of federal officials to approve the $2.4 million in "research funds" needed to allow project to proceed. Prototype streetcar 015 was transported back to the OIW factory, in Portland's southeast suburbs, in May 2010, and it returned on April 30, 2012, now fitted with the experimental Rockwell propulsion system. It began acceptance testing on the Portland Streetcar tracks in June and was certified for service on September 21, 2012. It entered passenger service the following day, September 22, 2012, the opening day of the new eastside line (CL Line).

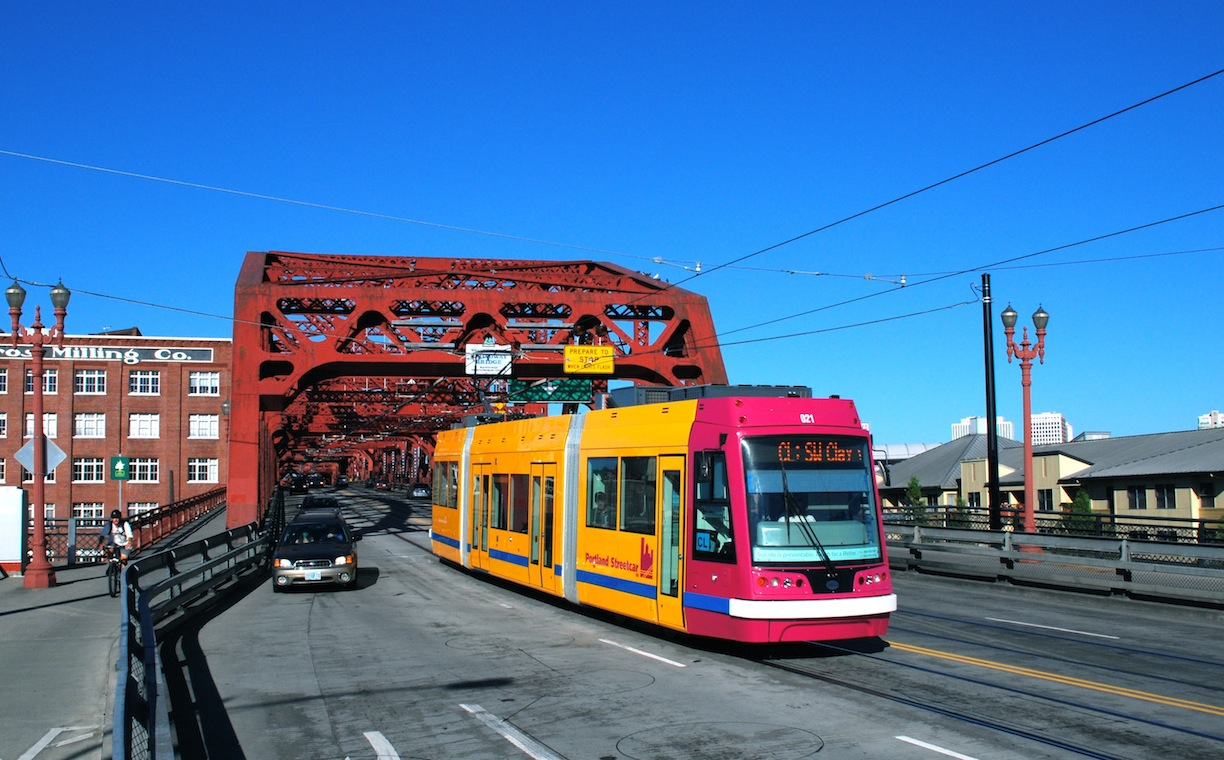
Car 021, the first production-series United Streetcar vehicle, crossing the Broadway Bridge on the CL Line.

Meanwhile, the city also purchased an additional five streetcars for the eastside expansion. A contract for these was let to United Streetcar in August 2009 and was originally for six cars. However, in light of Portland's dissatisfaction with the Škoda propulsion control system, the city decided in 2010 to modify the OIW/United Streetcar contract for these cars, to substitute equipment from Elin for the originally planned Škoda equipment. Fabrication of the streetcars had yet to begin at the time of that decision, but the change was substantial enough that delivery was delayed as a result, and the first cars are now not projected to be delivered until December 2012. These five cars were not fitted with the Rockwell equipment, because the Rockwell system was still being designed at the time that production was beginning on the additional cars. If the city had waited for it to be completed, installed and thoroughly tested in car 015 before installing it in the additional cars, doing so would delay the completion of those cars too much, city officials indicated. These first "production-series" cars are United Streetcar model "100", instead of 10T3. In 2011, production problems raised the cost of manufacturing of these cars, and as a result, the city agreed to reduce the number of cars on order from six to five. These cars have been assigned numbers 021–025 in the Portland Streetcar fleet. The first car (021) was delivered in January 2013 and entered service on June 11, 2013. As Portland Streetcar prepared to "close the loop" on the CL line with the completion of the Tilikum Crossing bridge, a seventh car (026) was purchased from United Streetcar and was delivered on November 21, 2014.

On March 21, 2018, Portland Streetcar announced an approval from city council to purchase two new Liberty Streetcars from Brookville Equipment Corporation. A third car was added to the order in December 2018. Because of the COVID-19 pandemic and other factors, production of the cars was delayed, and by spring 2021 they were not expected to arrive until late 2022 or early 2023. An option for two additional vehicles also exists. The delivery of the Brookville order began in late March 2023, with the arrival of the first car in Portland; the third and last car arrived in December 2023. They are numbered 031–033.

Prototype car 015, uniquely fitted with the experimental Rockwell propulsion system, became unreliable within a few years of entering service in 2012, and by 2019 it had experienced a system failure that the city was unable to repair. The car was last used in service in 2019, and was placed up for auction in 2024; however, it remained unsold in 2026.

In December 2025, a deal was reached that will see the three Brookville Liberty cars move to the Tacoma line of Sound Transit's Link light rail system in exchange for that line's three 2002-built Škoda/Inekon 10Ts, to allow both operators to standardize their fleets. Given the age difference between the two series being traded, Sound Transit agreed to pay $16.6 million to the City of Portland as part of the deal.

Portland Streetcar announced on April 2, 2026, that the city intends to order 15 CAF Urbos streetcars to replace both the Škoda-built vehicles (which are the oldest in the fleet) and several other vehicles that were deemed to warrant replacing due to age or damage. Specifically, the 15 new streetcars would replace 15 existing cars: Skoda 10T cars 001–007, Inekon 12-Trio cars 008–010, United Streetcar prototype 015, wrecked United Streetcar car 024, and the three 2002-built Skoda cars in the process of being acquired from Sound Transit for temporary use. The CAF streetcars will be fitted with batteries to allow off-wire usage as part of the Montgomery Park extension of the North/South Line, and are expected to enter revenue service by the time the extension opens, currently projected for 2031.

=== Vintage Trolley service ===
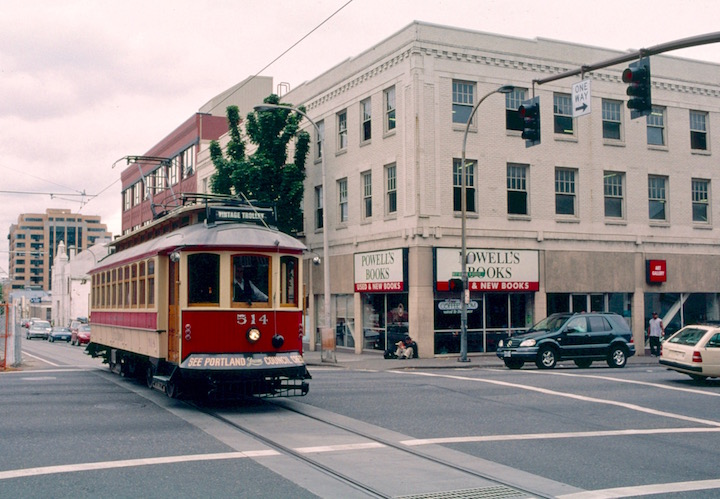
A Vintage Trolley in service on the Portland Streetcar line in 2001, passing Powell's Books. Operation of these cars on the PS line ended in 2005.

Until late 2005 the fleet also contained two Portland Vintage Trolleys, replicas of 1904 J. G. Brill Company streetcars owned by TriMet. These two cars (of four such cars owned by TriMet) were transferred to the city of Portland in 2001 for use on the Portland Streetcar line on weekends. They were used on both Saturdays and Sundays, with just one car in service on each day. However, they were not wheelchair-accessible on the streetcar line, and they lacked the satellite-detection equipment necessary for them to be detected by the real-time arrival system (NextBus) informing passengers waiting at stops. When the line was extended to RiverPlace, the Vintage Trolley service continued to terminate at PSU, because of concerns that the steep incline on the new section could damage the cars' motors. These and other issues led to suspension of the Vintage Trolley service in late November 2005. It never resumed, and the two vintage-style cars were returned to TriMet and moved back to that agency's Vintage Trolley carbarn next to the Rose Quarter MAX station in January 2007. (One other Vintage Trolley continued to provide service on a portion of the MAX system until 2014.)

=== Compatibility with MAX ===
Each Portland streetcar is 66 feet (20.12 m) long, whereas Portland's MAX cars are 88 to 95 feet (26.82–28.96 m) long, and streetcars are operated in revenue service as single cars at all times, never coupled into trains. However, all models of the fleet can couple with each other for a rescue tow. The shorter car length keeps station construction expense lower than would be the case for a light-rail station, but the smaller cars do not provide equal carrying capacity as that of a light-rail train; a single articulated Portland streetcar is only about one-third the length of a two-car MAX train.

Streetcar tracks in Portland are the same gauge as MAX tracks, but of a lighter and shallower construction (the rail bed is only 1 foot or 30.5 centimeters deep), and the two systems share the same overhead line voltage, 750 V DC. Because of this, it is technically possible for a Portland 10T or 12-Trio streetcar to run on MAX tracks, and indeed originally this was planned to take place if a streetcar needed a particular type of maintenance work that was beyond the capabilities of Portland Streetcar's own "carbarn". The two systems are connected at two places: the first is a single curve of track at SW 10th and Morrison connecting to the westbound Red and Blue Line track. An additional set of connections exists at both ends of the Tilikum Crossing, as Central Loop streetcars share tracks with the MAX Orange Line to cross the bridge.

TriMet's light-rail maintenance shops feature additional equipment, as TriMet's railcar fleet is many times larger, so streetcars were operated along the MAX tracks to the light-rail workshops at Ruby Junction (near the Ruby Junction/East 197th Avenue station on the Blue Line) for maintenance work on their trucks a few times. However, because the streetcar has a limited top speed of about 40 mph (64 km/h) (compared with 55 mph or 89 km/h for MAX trains) and because of differences in the signalling systems, streetcar movements to the Ruby Junction facility had to take place very late at night, a time when TriMet schedules maintenance on the MAX line. Portland Streetcar managers therefore decided, early on, simply to remove streetcar components needing repair at a TriMet facility and transport them there by road, avoiding the need to schedule time on the MAX line to move a streetcar. Portland Streetcar now owns a truing machine, which has been installed in the left bay of the North Yard.

While streetcars can operate on the MAX light rail tracks, a MAX car would be too heavy to operate on the streetcar's tracks, too wide for portions of its right-of-way, and unable to pass through the tighter curves on the Portland Streetcar system.

=== Maintenance yard ===
Streetcars are stored at the rail yard near the Portland Streetcar, Inc. headquarters (1516 NW Northrup Street). Storage tracks and facilities occupy three city blocks underneath an elevated section of Interstate 405, between NW Overton and NW Lovejoy streets (north-to-south) and NW 16th and NW 15th streets (west-to-east).

== History ==
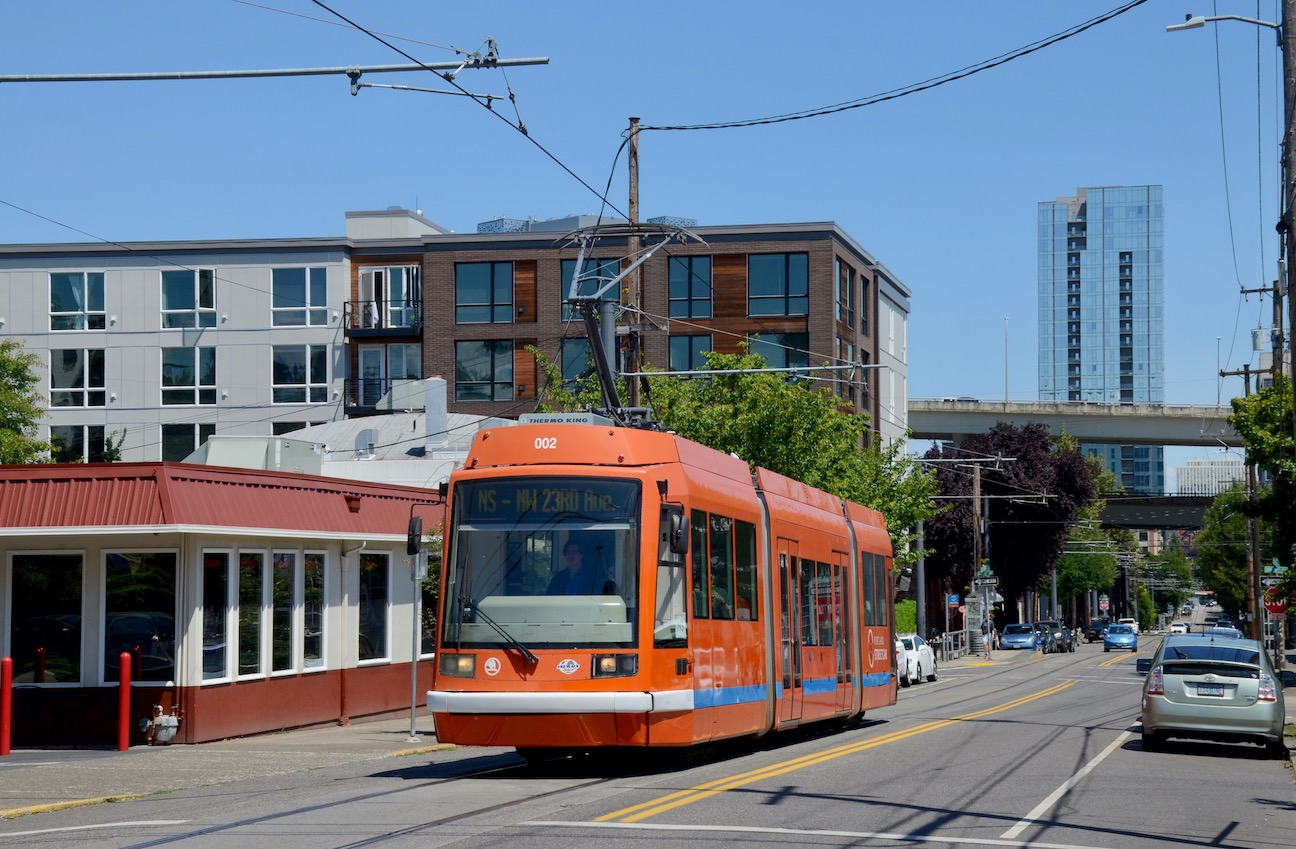
Car 002, one of the five cars that opened the system in 2001, on NW Northrup Street at 19th Avenue, which is on that 2001-opened route section

City of Portland planners began considering a streetcar system in 1990, in response to recommendations in a Central City Plan the council had adopted in 1988. The proposed network was originally referred to as the Central City Trolley and was envisioned as using faux-vintage streetcars like those of the Portland Vintage Trolley service. However, the name was later changed to Central City Streetcar, out of concern by project supporters that the word "trolley" would carry the connotation that the service was only a tourist attraction rather than a form of transportation, and in 1993 the city decided the line would use modern, low-floor cars instead of vintage ones. In 1995, the city estimated the cost to build a line from Northwest Portland to PSU as $30 million.

Portland Streetcar started with a 4.8 miles (7.7 km) counterclockwise loop of single track that commenced operations on July 20, 2001, running from the Portland State University (PSU) campus, north through the Pearl District, west to NW 23rd Avenue and then back to PSU on adjacent streets. Most of the $57 million used to build it came from local sources, and only $5 million came from the federal government. The line's original southern terminus was on SW Montgomery Street, with a stub-end section of two-way single track on that street between 4th and 5th Avenues, where the bi-directional streetcars would reverse directions at the end of each southbound trip; the last stop was on 5th at Montgomery. When opened, the line included a crossing on NW Northrup Street with a BNSF Railway freight spur on NW 13th Avenue, but the latter track was closed in 2005 and removed in summer 2005.

Portland Vintage Trolley service began operating on the new line on July 28, 2001, running on weekends only with one car, over the full line.

On March 11, 2005, a 0.6-mile (1 km) extension was placed into service at the line's southern end, from PSU to RiverPlace. This was the first phase of a plan to serve Portland's South Waterfront redevelopment area, including a new outpost of Oregon Health & Science University. The extension started where the track had previously ended, on Montgomery Street at 4th Avenue. It extended the short length of two-way single-track on Montgomery Street onto and along 4th Avenue almost to Harrison Street, making the full length of two-way single track about 450 feet (140 m) long, but the extension was otherwise all double-track. (The 4th Avenue section was doubled in 2014, but a very short section of two-way single track remains in use on Montgomery Street.) Streetcar-only signals ensure that only one direction is in use at one time. The extension cost $18.1 million, including the purchase of two additional streetcars, with the intent to allow streetcars to run every 10 minutes. In 2005 the Portland Streetcar project was awarded the Rudy Bruner Award for Urban Excellence gold medal. The weekends-only Vintage Trolley service did not cover the new section to RiverPlace, continuing to end on Montgomery Street — until being suspended in November 2005 and subsequently discontinued without ever resuming operation.

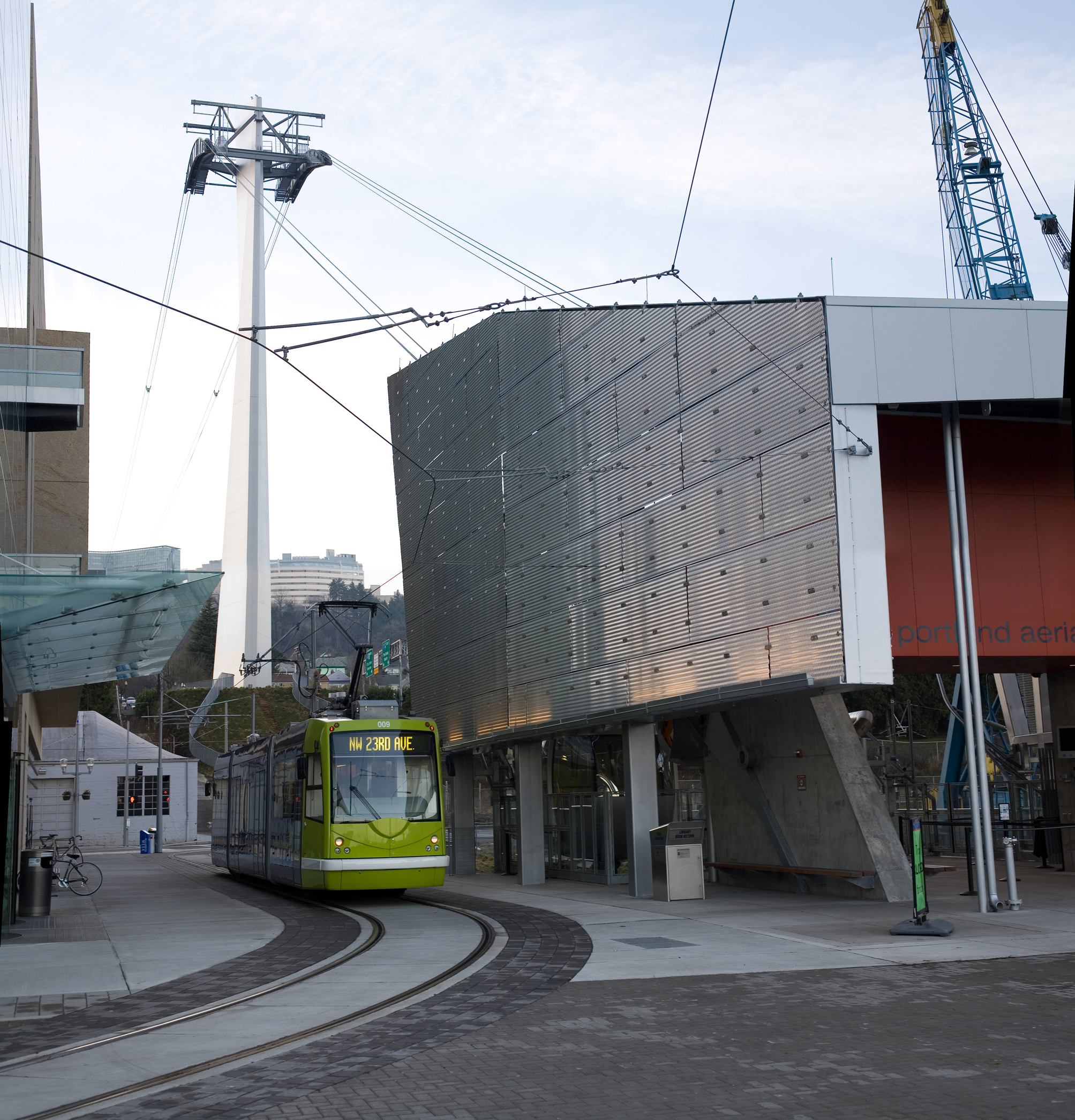
The Portland Streetcar passing by the lower station for the Portland Aerial Tram

Another extension of 0.42 mi (0.68 km) south to the lower terminus of the Portland Aerial Tram at SW Gibbs Street, in the South Waterfront District, opened on October 20, 2006. For the next five years, that section of track differed from the rest of the line in that the streetcar track ran entirely in its own right-of-way (formerly used by the Willamette Shore Trolley). It was also bi-directional single track. This configuration was always planned to be temporary, awaiting an expected rebuilding of Moody Avenue, and in November 2011 the streetcar line began using new double track on a realigned section of Moody. This change left the short section of bi-directional single track around 4th and Montgomery as the only such running on the current PS system. At the streetcar's Gibbs Street stop, a new pedestrian bridge opened in summer 2012, linking the stop to the Lair Hill neighborhood that was otherwise cut off by Interstate 5.

On August 17, 2007, the route was extended south of Gibbs Street, to SW Lowell and Bond, serving more of the South Waterfront district. This 0.46-mile (0.74 km) extension is a 10-block loop, from SW Moody and Gibbs proceeding south on Moody Avenue, east on Lowell Street and north on Bond Avenue to OHSU Commons at Gibbs, which stop is also directly adjacent to the entrance to the aerial tram. The Lowell & Bond station is located one block from the northern terminus of the Willamette Shore Trolley, adjacent to the U.S. Immigration and Customs Enforcement building on SW Bancroft St.

By 2008, Portland estimated the streetcar prompted the construction of more than 10,000 new housing units and 5,400,000 square feet (500,000 m^{2}) of institutional, office, and retail and construction within two blocks.

During 2010, Portland Streetcar had a weekday average of 11,900 riders. In August 2012, it was reported by one source as "about 10,000", but ridership varies by season – for example, being higher when Portland State University is in session – and the daily-ridership figure averaged over a 12-month period through summer 2012, the last 12-month period before the second line opened, was 11,200.

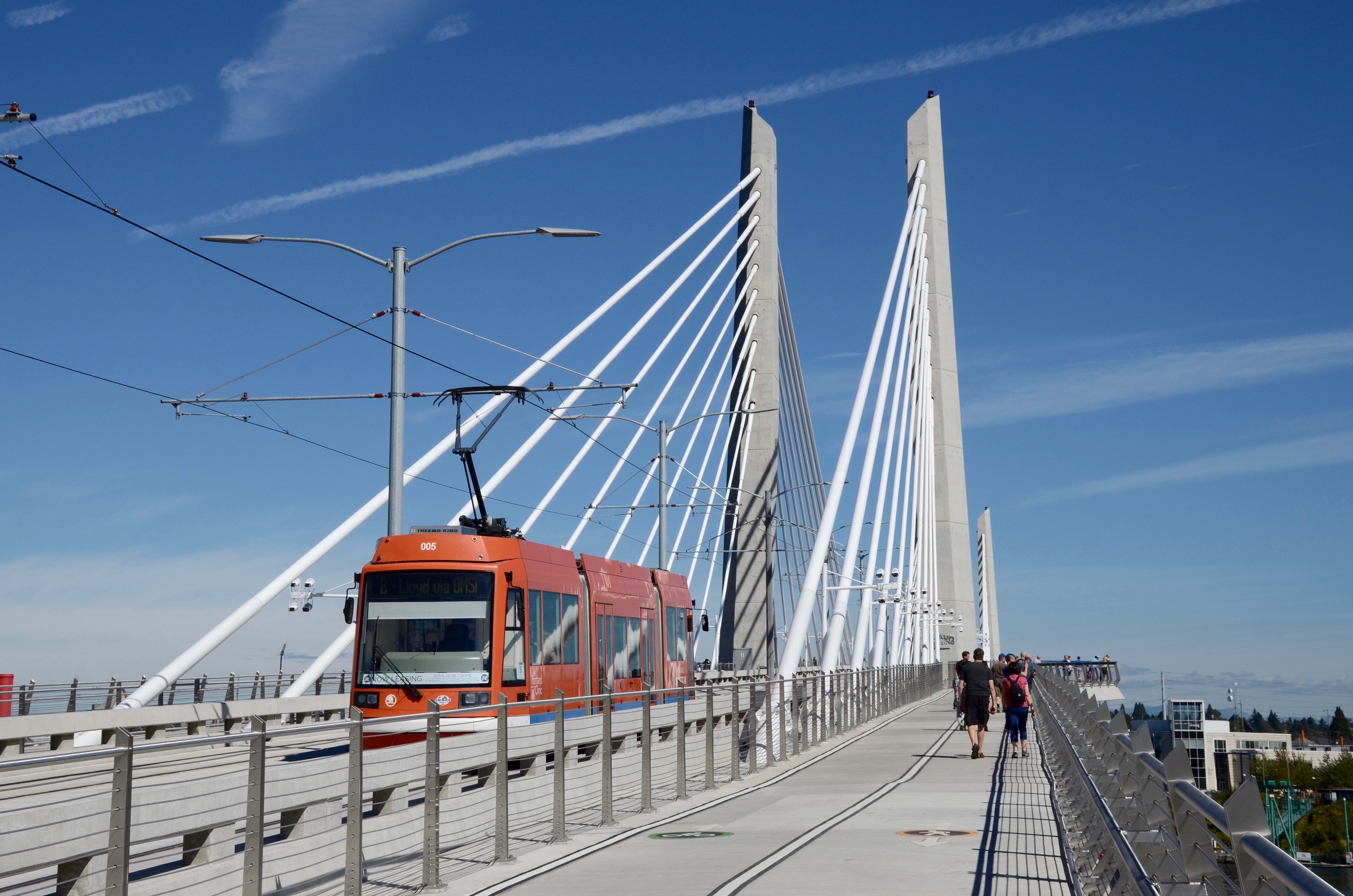
The Portland Streetcar system began using TriMet's new Tilikum Crossing bridge in September 2015.

On September 1, 2012, TriMet discontinued the Free Rail Zone (better known by its pre-2010 name, Fareless Square), which had previously allowed free service on the streetcar within Downtown and the Pearl District. A new streetcar-only fare of $1.00 was introduced at that time.

On September 22, 2012, the Eastside Line, renamed the Central Loop Line (or CL Line, for short), opened for service.

In 2014, about half of the system's only section of bidirectional single track used in service, along SW 4th Avenue and Montgomery Street, was converted to double track, with the installation a second track along 4th and around the turn onto Montgomery. This new track came into use on September 23, 2014, and reduced the remaining length of two-way single track to less than 100 feet (30 m) (in operational terms; less than 10 feet (3 m) of actual shared track), on Montgomery Street between 4th and 5th Avenues.

On August 30, 2015, the Central Loop Line was renamed as the Loop Service, with the A Loop traveling in a clockwise direction and the B Loop traveling counter-clockwise.

== Funding ==
Funding for the streetcar operation comes primarily from TriMet, fares, city parking revenue, and a "Local Improvement District" (special property tax assessed on properties near the line). Another source of funding for the streetcar is sponsorships of vehicles and stops, which in most cases have a minimum duration of one year, in contrast to the shorter-term advertising found on TriMet buses and MAX. Sponsoring organizations can have their name placed on the side of the vehicle, stop shelter or in the stop announcement, as well as a small advertisement placed inside the vehicle or shelter. Brochures and ticket sales can also be sponsored.

For the eastside line, the federal government contributed $75 million in 2009, with $20 million coming from Oregon Lottery-backed bonds; the rest of the cost was paid by the city, through the Portland Development Commission and a local improvement district tax on property owners near the line.

== Eastside line ==
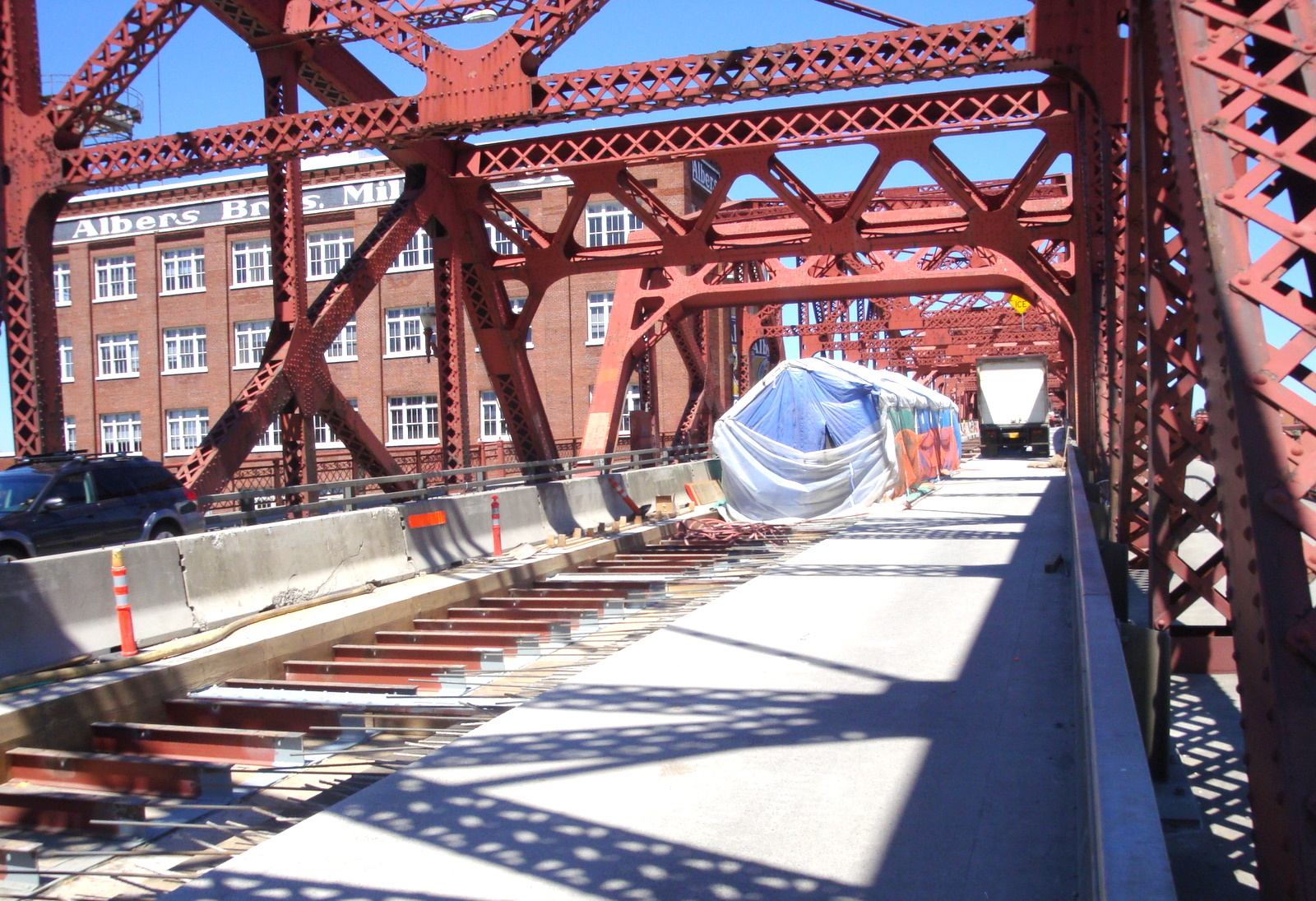
The Broadway Bridge under construction for Eastside Portland Streetcar.

Utility relocation work in connection with a 3.3-mile (5.3 km) expansion of the streetcar system to the city's inner eastside began in mid-August 2009. The work of laying the streetcar tracks began in early 2010, with service scheduled to start on September 22, 2012, a delay from what was originally an April 2012 date. The project involved work on the Broadway Bridge that required the bridge's weight to remain constant throughout construction and for work on its lift span to be suspended with 72 hours notice whenever a ship needed to get through.

In June 2003, the Office of Transportation adopted the Eastside Streetcar Alignment Study, a study for an extension of the streetcar to the Lloyd and Central Eastside Industrial Districts. In part, the desire for an eastside streetcar arose from the July 2001 report, Lloyd District Development Strategy. Proponents see it as a component of a potential transportation hub in the Lloyd District, bringing together the streetcar, MAX and bus service. Additionally, the new streetcar line will provide a transit connection between the Lloyd and Central Eastside districts that supporters believe is more attractive and permanent than the bus service (TriMet line 6) currently provided and is more likely to spur development in those areas. Existing businesses along the route have also voiced strong support for the project, believing it will bring new customers who otherwise would be more likely to shop in nearby downtown.

The plans were approved by the Metro (regional government) council in July 2006 and by the Portland city council in September 2007, the council committing to allocating $27 million of city funds. The estimated total cost of the project is $147 million, just over half of which is to be paid for with federal funds. On April 30, 2009, U.S. Transportation Secretary Ray LaHood announced the approval of $75 million in federal funding for the Eastside streetcar project, the full amount that had been requested by Portland. This allocation, secured in large part through the efforts of Oregon Representatives Earl Blumenauer and Peter DeFazio, was both the largest and the final component of the financing plan, and consequently the announcement meant the project could proceed to construction as soon as the city council had approved construction contracts. Twenty million dollars in state funds, $15.5 million from a Local Improvement District and a combination of various other local or regional sources complete the funding plan. Construction began in August 2009.

The routing of the Eastside line was finalized in about 2007 and measures about 3.3 miles (5.3 km) in each direction (slightly longer southbound). It leaves the original line at 10th and Lovejoy, runs east across the Willamette River via the Broadway Bridge to the Lloyd District, turns south, passing the Oregon Convention Center, and follows the Grand Avenue and Martin Luther King Jr. Boulevard couplet to the Oregon Museum of Science and Industry (OMSI), the initial terminus. Within the Lloyd District, the southbound routing follows 7th Avenue (from Weidler Street to Oregon Street), so as to come closer to the Lloyd Center and the many office towers in the district, but south of the convention center the route runs south along Martin Luther King Jr. Blvd. and north along Grand Avenue almost all the way to OMSI. The line's OMSI terminus is located just one block away from the new Oregon Rail Heritage Center.

At that location, the new line connects with the MAX Orange Line linking downtown with Milwaukie. The streetcars then share tracks with the Orange Line to cross the Willamette River again at the Tilikum Crossing to travel to the South Waterfront district, tying in with the existing north–south streetcar line there, and thereby creating a large loop in the overall streetcar network. For this reason, the Eastside expansion was often referred to as the "Eastside Loop" or the "Portland Streetcar Loop" – and in spring 2012 it was even officially named the "Central Loop Line" – but completion of the loop would come not less than three years after the opening of the Eastside line. The Orange Line was a project of TriMet, whereas the streetcar was a City of Portland effort, but TriMet and Metro agreed to permit streetcars and MAX trains to share the bridge tracks, as well as to allow buses, bicycles and pedestrians—but not private motor traffic.

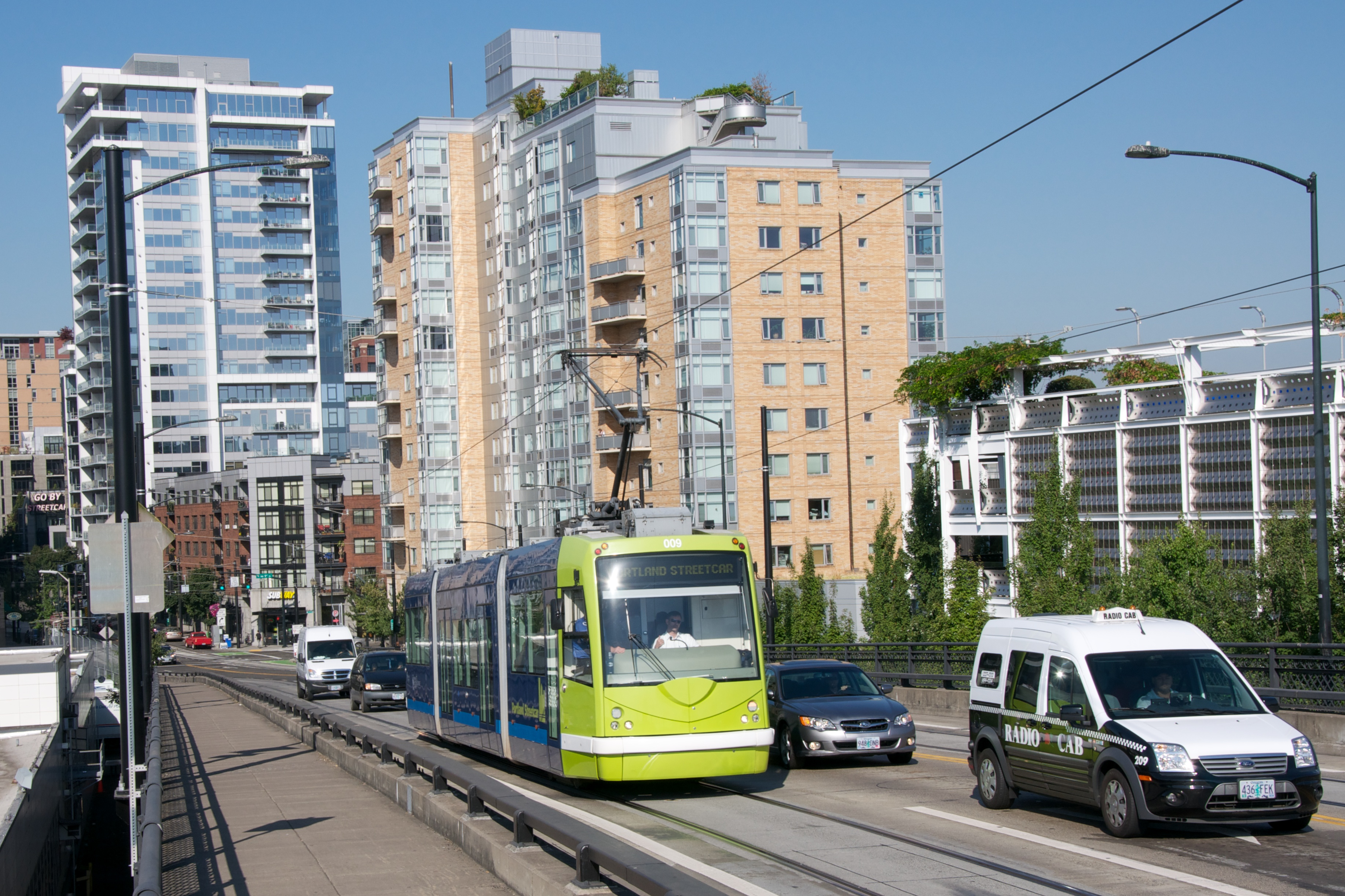
A streetcar on the Lovejoy Street ramp to the Broadway Bridge in September 2012

The budget for the Eastside Streetcar project, which was $148.3 million as of August 2012, included the cost of purchasing additional vehicles, and in August 2009 the city placed an order with United Streetcar (see Vehicles section, above) for six cars of the same general type as those currently operated, but the quantity was later reduced to five.

The new line opened on September 22, 2012, as the Central Loop Line, or CL Line. The scheduled headways are 18 minutes on weekdays, 17 minutes on Saturdays and 20 minutes on Sundays. Its opening was concurrent with a slight service reduction on the outer sections of the existing line, now called the North-South Line (or NS Line), to 14-minute intervals on weekdays (from the previous 12–13 minutes), but has increased the average frequency to about every 7 minutes on 10th and 11th Avenues, where the two lines overlap.

== Proposed expansions ==
Expansion of the streetcar system along other corridors is proposed, for the longer term. After a series of public meetings soliciting input on a draft, the city council adopted a "Streetcar System Concept Plan" in September 2009. The long-range plan identified potential corridors for future streetcar lines based on studies on ridership, land use, transportation patterns and development opportunities.

=== Montgomery Park to Hollywood District ===
In January 2018, Portland Streetcar started exploring adding service to Montgomery Park in the Northwest Industrial District. Two possible alignments have been proposed, one using NW Raleigh and NW Thurman, the other using NW Wilson and NW York. Both alignments would connect with the existing NS Line using NW 18th and NW 19th. The cost of the new alignment has not yet been determined, $370,000 in City General Funds has been requested. On December 18, 2018, the Federal Transit Administration has given a $1,076,000 grant to the extension as part of a pilot program. This will go towards study of the Wilson/York and 18th/19th couplets and a new turn around track at the Oregon Convention Center. These plans will add 2.3 miles (3.7 km) of track and double the capacity for Rose Quarter and Lloyd Center service, and the prospect of farther extension into the Hollywood neighborhood to the east have been a part of the study.

=== Lake Oswego ===
A proposal to add a 6-mile (10 km) southern extension of the streetcar to Lake Oswego was considered beginning in 2004, but was shelved in 2012 due to lack of support among Lake Oswego city officials.

In 1988, a consortium of several local governments purchased from Southern Pacific Railroad the 6.2-mile (10.0 km) Jefferson Branch freight rail line, which SP had ceased using in 1983, with the intention of preserving the right-of-way for future passenger rail transit use. Since 1990, the rail corridor has been kept in use by the Willamette Shore Trolley heritage streetcar service, a mostly seasonal, excursion-type operation, but local transportation officials remained interested in putting the corridor to use for mass transit in the longer term, and formal discussion increased as the opening of Portland Streetcar's first line neared, in 2001. A 2004 study by TriMet showed that extending the Portland Streetcar system over this right-of-way could be cost-effective and would be a better choice in this corridor than building a more costly MAX (light rail) line. In December 2007, the Metro council approved undertaking environmental-impact studies for the proposed improvements and comparing the introduction of streetcar transit service with the alternative of "enhanced bus service". The work was delayed by a lack of funding, but got under way in spring 2009 after the interested local jurisdictions reached agreement on financing the study, and a Draft Environmental Impact Statement.

As proposed, the line would have followed the Willamette Shore Trolley (WST) right-of-way, extending from the current SW Lowell St. terminus down SW Moody Avenue and proceeding along the WST right-of-way to Lake Oswego, with a terminus near a shopping center at N State St. and North Shore Blvd. The WST alignment was thought to relieve traffic congestion on Oregon Route 43, which parallels it and on some sections has steep hillsides where it would be cost-prohibitive to widen the highway. The route would have had 10 or 11 stations along the alignment and would be mostly double-track with two or three single-track segments where the alignment is too narrow to widen. Stops would be at Hamilton Ct., Boundary St., Pendleton St., Carolina St., Nevada St., Sellwood Bridge, Riverwood Rd., Briarwood Rd., 'B' Ave., and the terminus. Up to 400 park-and-ride spaces would have been included near the terminus.

In January 2012, facing local opposition from some residents living adjacent to the right-of-way, and after losing support among Lake Oswego city officials due to cost and concerns about lifestyle changes caused by the Streetcar, the project was officially suspended.

== Comparison with light rail ==
In contrast with light rail transit systems, vehicles on modern streetcar systems such as the Portland Streetcar are rarely separated from other traffic and are not given traffic-signal priority over other vehicles, except in a few situations to allow the rail cars—which cannot turn as sharply as most other motor vehicles—to make some turns. In Portland, using this "mixed traffic" operation has reduced the cost of constructing each segment and—by not closing traffic lanes permanently to other traffic, as is typically done with light rail—also minimized disruption to traffic flow, and allowed curbside parking to be retained, but also means slower operating speeds compared to light rail. Additional factors making the Portland Streetcar line less expensive to build per mile than light rail are that use of city streets largely eliminated the need to acquire private property for portions of the right-of-way, as has been necessary for the region's light rail (MAX) lines, and that the vehicles' smaller size and therefore lighter weight has enabled the use of a "shallower track slab". The latter means that construction of the trackway necessitated excavating to a depth of only 12.2 inches (310 mm) instead of the conventional (for light rail) depth of around 18.3 inches (460 mm), significantly reducing the extent to which previously existing underground utilities had to be relocated to accommodate the trackway.

== Legacy and influence ==
Earl Blumenauer, former council member on the Portland City Council, and later the U.S. representative for Oregon's 3rd congressional district, believes that Portland contributed – with a few other early adopters – to an expanding trend in the 2010s toward streetcar lines in other US cities.

== See also ==
- Portland Railway, Light and Power Company
- Portland Street Railway Company
- Portland Traction Company
- Streetcars in North America
