= A and B Loop =

Streetcar circle route in Portland, Oregon, U.S.

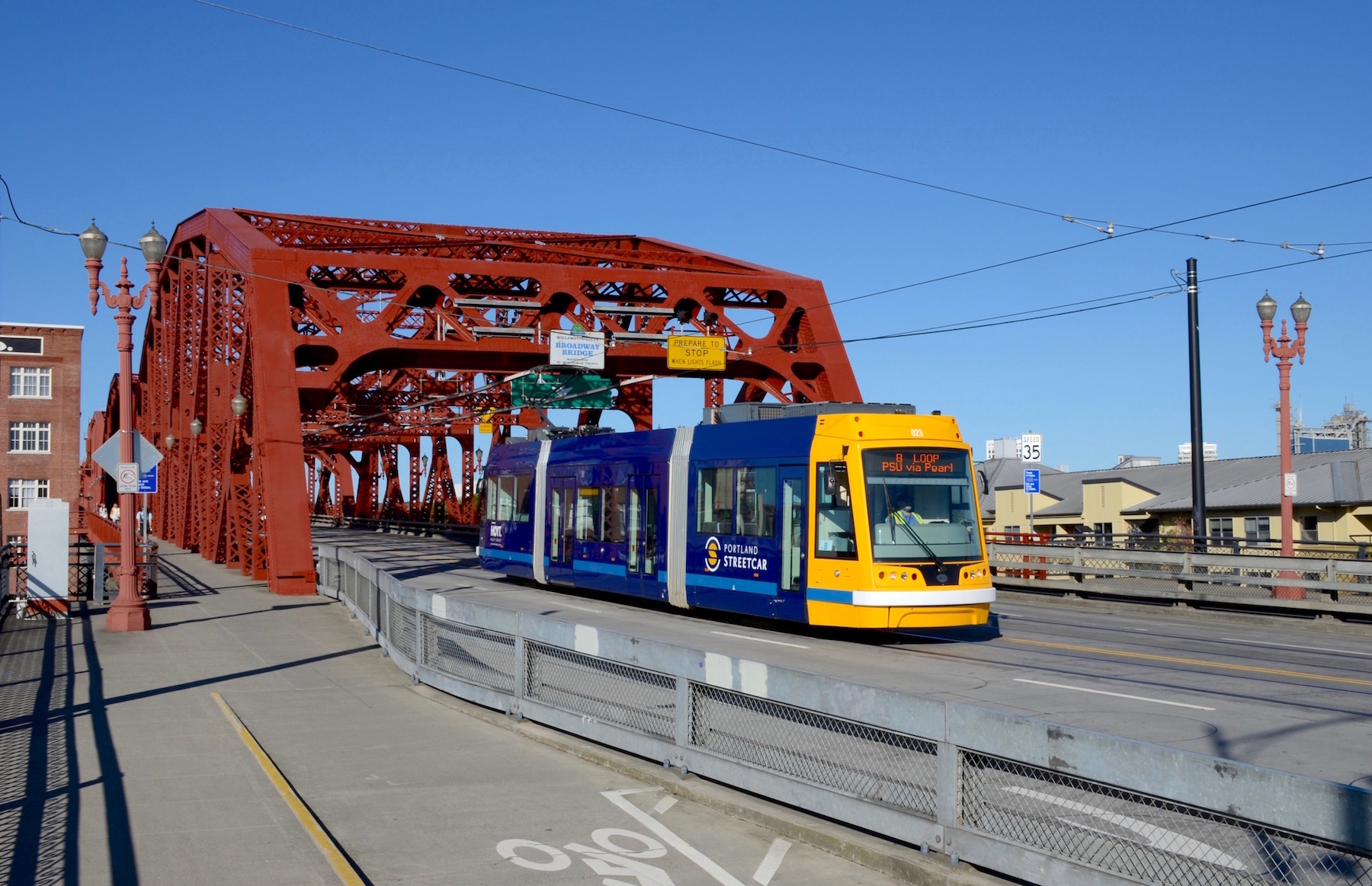
- A streetcar operating the B Loop route and crossing the Broadway Bridge in 2016

Overview
- Other names: Portland Streetcar Loop Project; Central Loop Line (2012–2015)
- Status: Operational
- Owner: City of Portland
- Locale: Portland, Oregon, U.S.
- Stations: 52

Service
- Type: Streetcar
- System: Portland Streetcar
- Services: 2
- Operators: Portland Streetcar, Inc.; TriMet
- Daily ridership: A Loop: 1,541; B Loop: 1,369; (Weekday, August 2022)

History
- Opened: September 22, 2012; 14 years ago

Technical
- Line length: A Loop: 6.1 mi (9.8 km); B Loop: 6.6 mi (10.6 km)
- Character: At-grade (mixed between street running and exclusive lane) and elevated
- Track gauge: 4 ft 8 1/2 in (1,435 mm) standard gauge
- Electrification: Overhead line, 750 V DC

The A and B Loop is a streetcar circle route of the Portland Streetcar system in Portland, Oregon, United States. Operated by Portland Streetcar, Inc. and TriMet, it is made up of two separate services: the 6.1-mile (9.8 km) A Loop, which runs clockwise, and the 6.6-mile (10.6 km) B Loop, which runs counterclockwise. The route travels a loop between the east and west sides of the Willamette River by crossing the Broadway Bridge in the north and Tilikum Crossing in the south.

The A and B Loop connects Portland's downtown, Pearl District, Lloyd District, Central Eastside, and South Waterfront. It serves various landmarks and institutions, including the Rose Quarter, the Oregon Convention Center, the Oregon Museum of Science and Industry (OMSI), Oregon Health & Science University (OHSU), and Portland State University (PSU). Riders can transfer to Frequent Express (FX) and MAX Light Rail from several stations along the route.

Portland city officials considered an eastside streetcar line upon authorizing the Central City Streetcar on the west side in 1997. After several years of planning, the Portland Streetcar Loop Project was approved and held its groundbreaking in 2009. The first 3.3 miles (5.3 km) opened between the Broadway Bridge and OMSI on September 22, 2012. It was inaugurated by the Central Loop Line (CL Line) service, which ran additionally on the westside along 10th and 11th avenues. The opening of Tilikum Crossing in 2015 extended the streetcar from OMSI to the South Waterfront; this completed the loop, and the CL Line was rebranded to A and B Loop.

== History ==
=== Planning ===
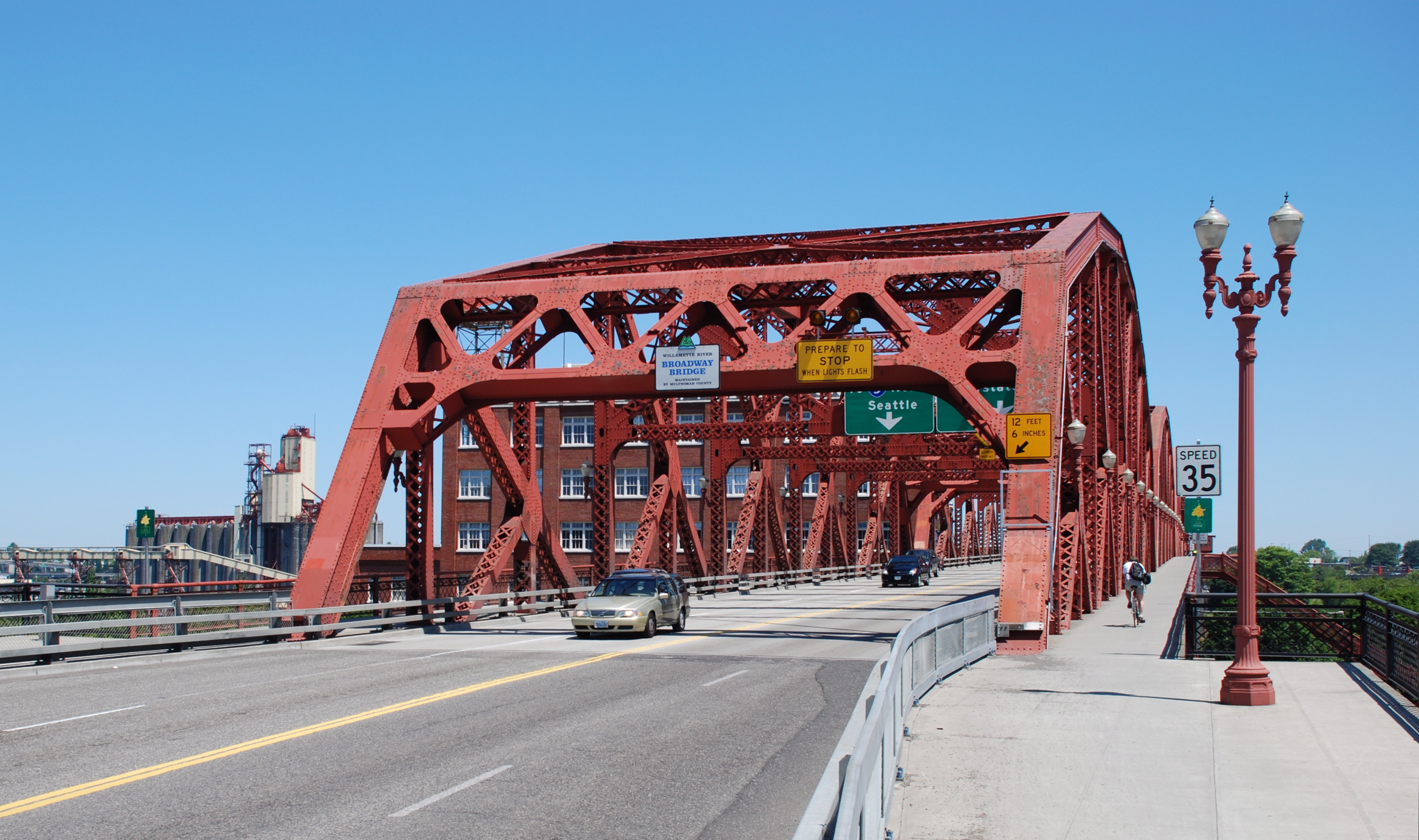
The Broadway Bridge in 2009, prior to the installation of streetcar tracks

In 1990, a citizen advisory committee, citing the 1988 Central City Plan, convinced the Portland City Council to develop a streetcar (then referred to as "trolley") network in downtown Portland. In July 1997, the city council formally authorized the Central City Streetcar project. By then, discussions to expand streetcar service east of the Willamette River had also begun, and $200,000 was allocated to strengthen the outer lanes of the Hawthorne Bridge with the intention of having it carry a future line between OMSI and the Oregon Convention Center. The Hawthorne Bridge was closed in March 1998 and reopened in April 1999 with the outer-lane decks rebuilt to accommodate notches for rails. In July 2001, the Lloyd District Development Strategy proposed a separate plan that envisioned a Lloyd District transit hub, with modern streetcars complementing existing bus and MAX Light Rail service; it suggested running streetcar lines on Broadway and Weidler streets through to the west side via the Broadway Bridge, which had carried streetcars from 1913 to 1940.

In February 2003, Portland Streetcar officials, amid TriMet (Portland's regional transit agency) plans to construct a new bridge over the Willamette River for the Portland–Milwaukie Light Rail Project, proposed an inner eastside loop route using the Broadway Bridge and TriMet's proposed bridge (instead of the Hawthorne Bridge). The city council adopted the Eastside Streetcar Alignment Study that June. The study outlined a westside–eastside streetcar route that ran from the existing streetcar tracks in the Pearl District, across the Broadway Bridge to the Lloyd District, then south along Grand Avenue and Martin Luther King Jr. Boulevard to Hawthorne Boulevard. A southern crossing back to the west side depended upon whether the proposed bridge would be constructed, leaving that section undetermined at the time. In 2008, the Portland–Milwaukie project steering committee selected a locally preferred alternative that included a new river crossing between the South Waterfront and OMSI near Caruthers Street; this led to a decision to build the first phase of the eastside streetcar 3.3 miles (5.3 km) up to OMSI (farther south from Hawthorne Boulevard) until the new bridge could be completed, after which the streetcar would cross the bridge back to the west side to complete the loop.

=== Funding and construction ===
Metro, the Portland metropolitan area's regional government, approved the eastside streetcar extension with the selection of a locally preferred alternative on July 20, 2006, that the city council adopted in September 2007. The total cost of the project, including the cost to purchase additional vehicles, amounted to $148.8 million. Portland allocated $27 million of city funds, and $20 million from the state, $15.5 million from a local improvement district, and a combination of various other local or regional sources completed the locally sourced funding. On April 30, 2009, U.S. Transportation Secretary Ray LaHood announced $75 million in federal funding for the project, the full amount that was requested. It was the first streetcar project to receive funding under the Small Starts program in part due to the Obama administration's departure from the practices of the Bush administration, which had awarded the funding to projects based on speed across long routes. The Small Starts allocation, secured in large part through the efforts of U.S. Representatives Earl Blumenauer and Peter DeFazio of Oregon, was the largest and final component of the financing plan and meant the project could proceed with construction.

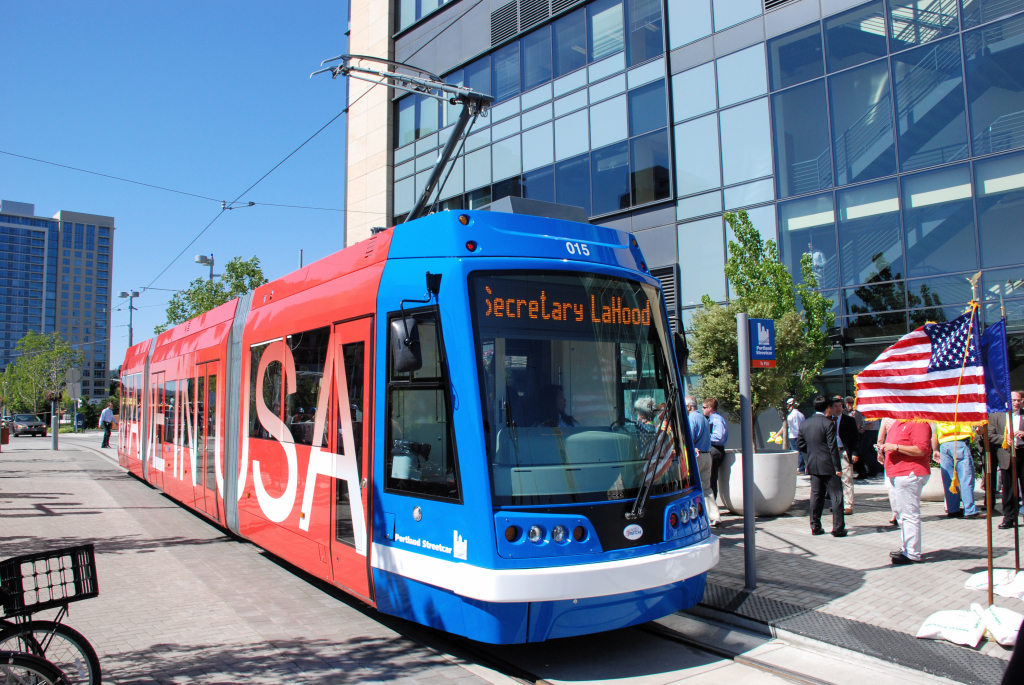
Unveiling of the United Streetcar 10T3 prototype in July 2009

In January 2007, Oregon Iron Works was awarded a $4 million contract to locally produce a streetcar prototype as provided by the Transportation Equity Act of 2005. On July 1, 2009, its subsidiary, United Streetcar, unveiled the first prototype in Portland; it was the first U.S.-built streetcar in nearly 60 years. That August, the city signed a $20 million contract to purchase six new vehicles from United Streetcar for the eastside extension. In July 2011, the city council agreed to contractual changes that reduced the number of streetcars on order from six to five due to unanticipated costs related to production. United Streetcar had relied on Czech streetcar manufacturer Škoda, which built the Portland Streetcar's first vehicles, to provide the propulsion system that eventually failed acceptance testing. Project officials subsequently opted to obtain the propulsion system from Austrian manufacturer Elin, which necessitated changes to the streetcar design to accommodate a different form factor. The changes led to higher costs and delayed the project for five months.

Groundbreaking for the Portland Streetcar Loop Project took place on June 25, 2009. Portland awarded the building contract to Stacy Witbeck, and construction began in August. For the project route along city streets, crews laid tracks in three-to-four-block increments, with each segment completed every four weeks. Excavation for the trackbed was eight feet (2.4 m) wide and 14 to 18 inches (36 to 46 cm) deep. Workers closed the Broadway Bridge for renovation from July to September 2010. To maintain the existing weight of the bridge after adding tracks, which was necessary to allow it to continue lifting its spans, workers replaced the deck with lighter fiber-reinforced concrete. In the Pearl District, sections of what had been two bidirectional streets—Lovejoy and Northrup—were converted into one-way streets after rail was installed. The Lovejoy ramp on the west end of the Broadway Bridge reopened to traffic in November 2010. In Southeast Portland, workers built a 425-foot (130 m) bridge that carried the streetcar from Southeast Stephens Street to the project's eastern terminus at OMSI. The extension's overhead lines went live in April 2012, and testing continued through to opening day.

=== Opening and closing the loop ===
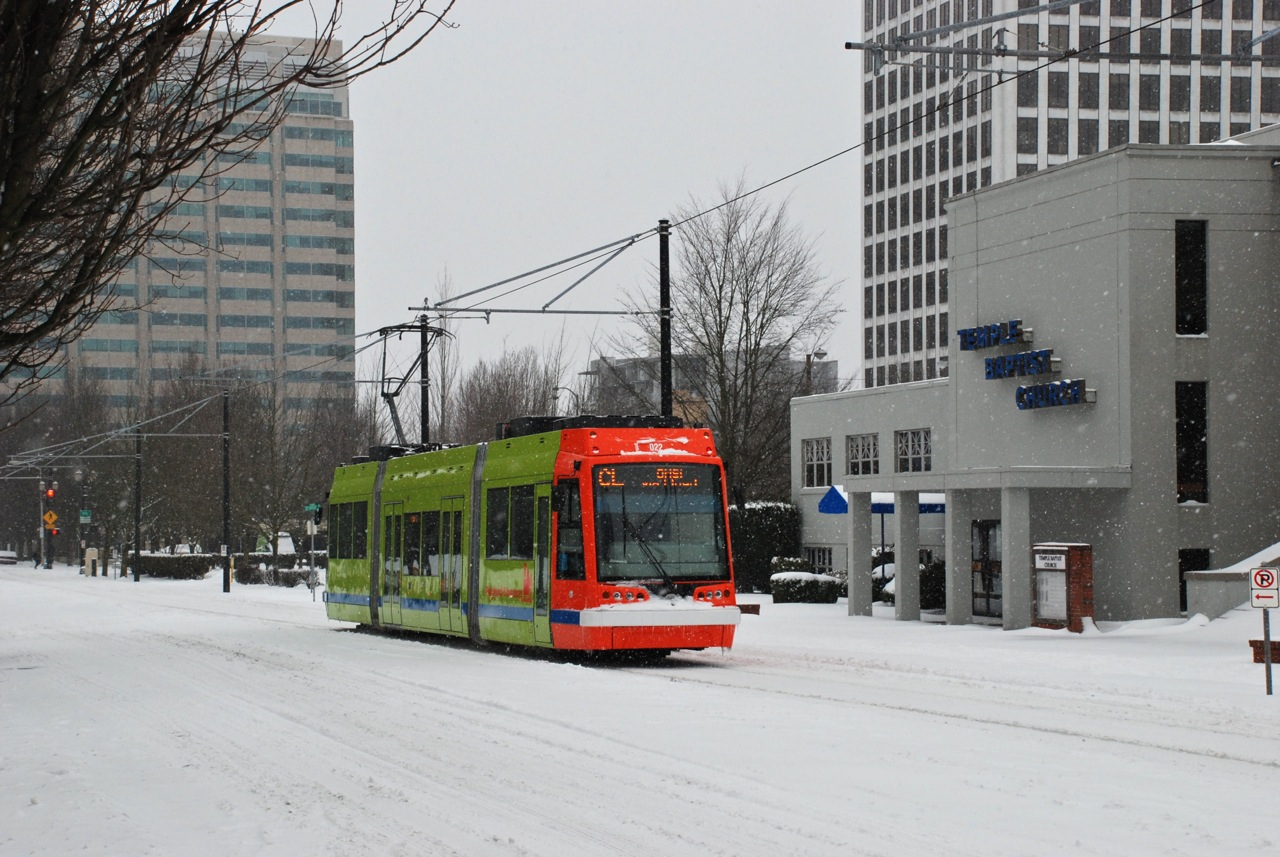
A CL Line vehicle bound for OMSI on Northeast 7th Avenue in 2014

The 28-station, 3.3-mile (5.3 km) eastside extension opened on September 22, 2012. Portland Streetcar formed a new service called the "Central Loop Line" (CL Line) and renamed the original service on the west side the "North South Line" (NS Line). The CL Line operated the eastside extension and ran additionally on the west side via 10th and 11th avenues for a total of 4.5 miles (7.2 km); it overlapped with the NS Line between Southwest Market Street and Northwest Northrup Street. Service along the eastside segment commenced with frequencies of 18 minutes instead of 15 minutes (or 12 minutes as initially planned) due to funding cuts by the city and TriMet, and delivery delays from United Streetcar. The delays additionally forced Portland Streetcar to deploy its entire fleet of 11 cars and operate without a spare. Local publications highlighted the resulting infrequent service and criticized the streetcar's reliability and slow speed. Joseph Rose, writing for The Oregonian, called the streetcar the "Stumptown Slug" after he traveled quicker from OMSI to Powell's City of Books on foot. The first new streetcar finally arrived in January 2013 and entered service on June 11. Fares were $1 upon opening due to TriMet's discontinuation of the Free Rail Zone, which had allowed free use of the Portland Streetcar system. TriMet had intended to cut service on bus route 6–ML King Jr Blvd, which ran alongside the eastside tracks, but increased service instead after interviewing riders.

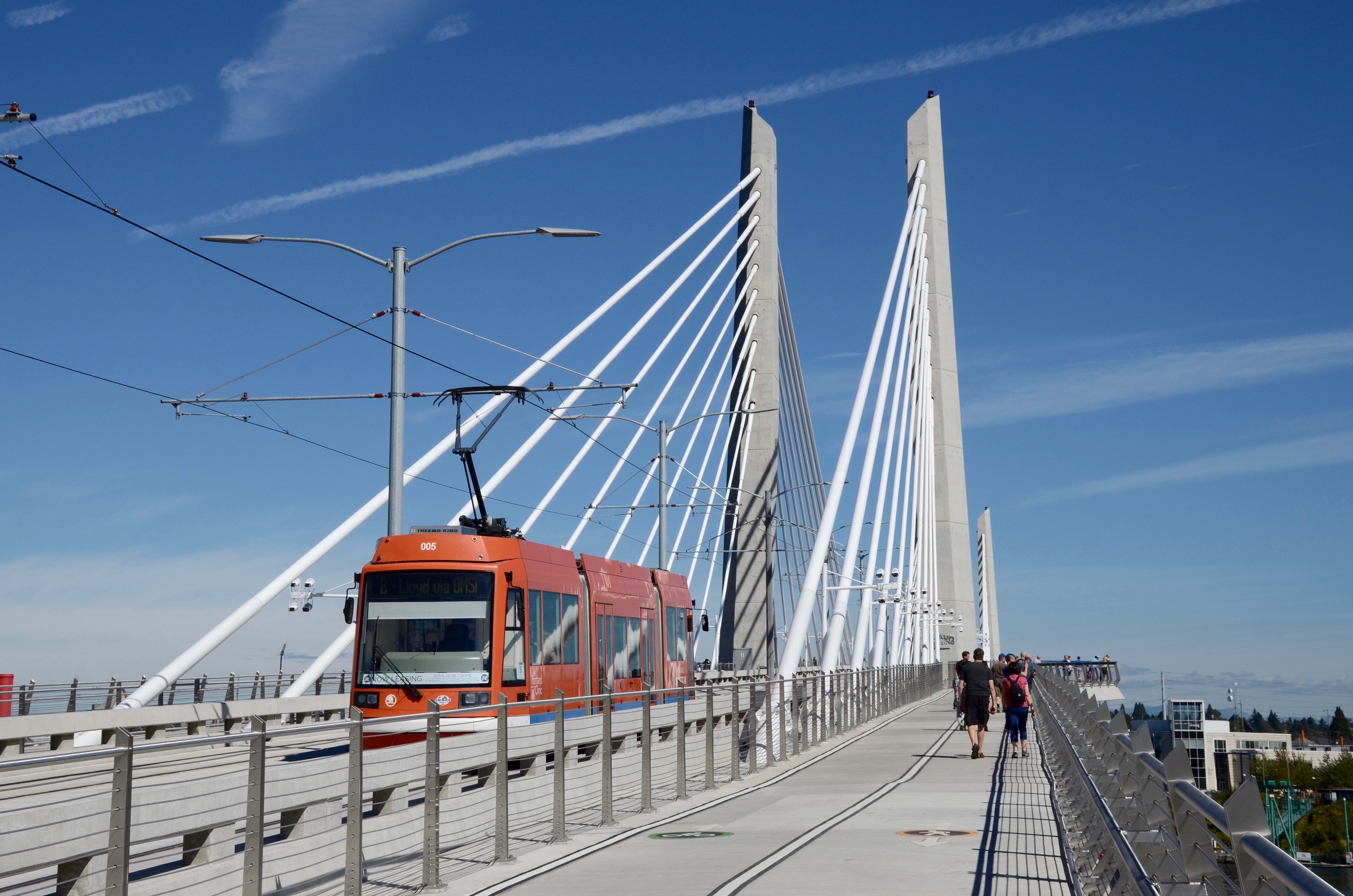
A streetcar on Tilikum Crossing in 2015

The second phase of the Portland Streetcar Loop Project, referred to as "Close the Loop", which was later changed to "Complete the Loop", extended the streetcar tracks from OMSI across the Willamette River to the South Waterfront. This phase had awaited the Portland–Milwaukie project's new river crossing, which finally began construction in 2011. The project had a total cost of $6.7 million and included automatic train stop upgrades. Construction of the streetcar components started in August 2013 with the installation of a turning loop on the intersection of Southeast Stephens Street, Grand Avenue, and Martin Luther King Jr. Boulevard. From September to October that year, crews expanded the SE Water/OMSI streetcar platform and installed the streetcar-track connection with the new bridge. Shuttle buses carried riders in sections where the streetcar tracks were temporarily closed. From June 26 to August 17, 2015, CL Line service ceased operating as part of Multnomah County's closure of the Broadway Bridge to make way for repainting.

On August 30, 2015, a new temporary schedule eliminated the name CL Line in favor of two separately named routes: "A Loop" and "B Loop". A Loop and B Loop took over the CL Line route and were further extended on the west side via existing tracks from Southwest 10th and Market streets in downtown Portland to Southwest Moody and Meade streets in the South Waterfront. Streetcars began crossing the new bridge, which by then was named "Tilikum Crossing", but without carrying passengers across it, during a two-week transitional "pre-revenue service" phase. The CL Line was formally re-branded as the "A and B Loop" on September 12, 2015, when Tilikum Crossing opened to the public and began permitting streetcars to carry passengers on the route section across the bridge.

=== Impact and later developments ===
Portland city and streetcar officials have credited the eastside extension with encouraging development along and near its route; they have claimed that major redevelopment projects in the Lloyd District, including years-long efforts by Metro to build a convention center hotel, began or were announced after the extension had started construction. In 2013, Hassalo on Eighth broke ground at the Lloyd 700 "superblock", where the eastside extension was deliberately routed to support redevelopment. OMSI began pursuing redevelopment plans for its location in Southeast Portland in 2008. Days before the eastside extension's opening, OMSI's senior vice president stated that the streetcar's presence "will be an important element in the development of the lower eastside". In December 2021, OMSI submitted a formal proposal to the city for the "OMSI District", which plans to develop 10 city blocks into mixed-use buildings and includes up to 1,200 new housing units. A study published for the Transportation Research Record in 2018 noted that observed stations along the CL Line increased employment around their areas by 22 percent, compared to just eight percent by Multnomah County, between 2006 and 2013.

In February 2020, the Portland City Council adopted the Rose Lane Project in an effort to improve bus and streetcar travel times within the city. The ongoing project aims to create red-painted dedicated lanes, remove or restrict on-street parking, and implement traffic-signal priority for buses and streetcars. That October, the Portland Bureau of Transportation (PBOT) launched the MLK/Grand Transit Improvements project, a complement to the Rose Lane Project that added red lanes to the streetcar alignment on Grand Avenue and Martin Luther King Jr. Boulevard. Work started on October 7 and was completed after four weeks.

In April 2022, the City of Portland filed a lawsuit in Multnomah County Circuit Court against TriMet and Stacy Witbeck, alleging negligence and breach of contract. The city claimed that TriMet failed to properly oversee the contractor, whose workers, in turn, did not “perform the work in a professional and workmanlike manner” during construction of an elevated section of the streetcar near OMSI. The defects, which included cracked walls and foundational flaws, were discovered after the project’s completion. The city sought $10 million from the defendants to cover repair costs. In October 2025, the city and TriMet agreed to a $7.5 million settlement.

== Service ==
As of January 2022, the A and B Loop operates from 5:30 am to 11:30 pm on weekdays, from 7:30 am to 11:30 pm on Saturdays, and from 7:30 am to 10:30 pm on Sundays. Headways in each direction range from 15 minutes between 10:00 am and 7:00 pm on weekdays and Saturdays to 20 minutes for all other times. Traveling a complete loop in either direction takes just under one hour.

=== Ridership ===
In August 2022, the A Loop carried an average of 1,541 riders on weekdays while the B Loop carried 1,369 riders. Prior to the COVID-19 pandemic, which impacted public transit ridership globally, the route had served significantly more riders; the A and B Loop carried 3,612 and 3,064, respectively, on weekdays in September 2019. During the first two weeks from opening, about 3,200 riders used the eastside extension per day on weekdays, 1,700 fewer riders than what the westside line recorded when it opened. Six months later, PBOT reported the streetcar collected only 55 percent of its expected fares; PBOT had projected fare revenues of $1 million annually, which would have resulted in an 11-percent farebox recovery ratio of its $8.9 million operating expenses.

Forecasts used to help justify federal funding for the Portland Streetcar Loop Project predicted 8,100 average weekday trips during the first operating year, while an alternative forecasting method predicted 3,900 average weekday trips for the same period. The FTA recorded an actual usage of 2,500 average weekday trips for the first year. Analysis attributed the lower-than-anticipated ridership to less frequent service than planned (15-minute actual headways versus the planned 12 minutes) and overstated projections for the number of commuters transferring from outside the Central City. The overall system set a ridership record in February 2017; that year saw ridership increase by 10 percent, mostly along the eastside. The streetcar set another record in April 2018, when the A and B Loop recorded 7,424 riders per day on weekdays.

=== Route ===
The A and B Loop is a circle route that runs across subdistricts contained within Portland's Central City, namely downtown Portland, Pearl District, Lloyd District, Central Eastside, and South Waterfront. It consists of two services that for a majority of the route operate in a one-way pair: the 6.1-mile (9.8 km) A Loop, which runs clockwise, and the 6.6-mile (10.6 km) B Loop, which runs counterclockwise. From Southwest Market Street, the route travels north through downtown Portland to the Pearl District via 10th and 11th avenues. It turns east on Northwest 10th and Lovejoy towards the Broadway Bridge and crosses the Willamette River. After the bridge, the tracks traverse Broadway and Weidler streets. The B Loop then turns right onto Northeast Grand Avenue, while the A Loop turns right on Northeast 7th Avenue, left on Oregon street, and another left onto Martin Luther King Jr. Boulevard. The lines reconnect at a turning loop on Southeast Stephens Street and enter an overpass at Harrison Street, which carries the route to OMSI.

From OMSI, the streetcar tracks connect with the MAX tracks just west of the OMSI/Southeast Water MAX station as they approach Tilikum Crossing to cross the river back to the west side. They split at the four-track South Waterfront/South Moody MAX station, where the streetcar tracks run in the middle of the station's island platforms but don’t stop at the station. The route connects with the westside streetcar alignment on Southwest Moody Avenue then heads north towards RiverPlace. The tracks turn left on Southwest River Parkway, right on 4th Avenue, left on Montgomery Street, and split again on 5th Avenue. From the intersection of Southwest Montgomery and 5th, the A Loop crosses PSU's Urban Plaza diagonally for Mill Street, while the B Loop turns right onto 5th Avenue. The A Loop returns to Southwest 10th Avenue from Mill Street, while the B Loop turns left onto Market Street and proceeds until it returns to 11th Avenue.

A geographic map of the Portland Streetcar system: A Loop, B Loop, NS Line

=== Stations ===
The A and B Loop serves 52 stations, 24 of which are shared with the NS Line. Each platform is equipped with a ticket vending machine, real-time display system, and line information signs, and is accessible to users with limited mobility. Connections to FX and MAX Light Rail can be made at several stops along the route.

List of A and B Loop stations
Station		Neighborhood	Began service	Connections and notes
A Loop	B Loop	Neighborhood	Began service	Connections and notes
SW 10th & Clay	SW 11th & Clay	Downtown	September 22, 2012	Portland Streetcar: NS
Art Museum	SW 11th & Jefferson	Downtown	September 22, 2012	Portland Streetcar: NS; Serves Portland Art Museum
Central Library	SW 11th & Taylor	Downtown	September 22, 2012	Portland Streetcar: NS; MAX Light Rail: Blue Line, Red Line; Serves Central Library
SW 10th & Alder	SW 11th & Alder	Downtown	September 22, 2012	Portland Streetcar: NS
NW 10th & Couch	NW 11th & Couch	Pearl District	September 22, 2012	Portland Streetcar: NS; Serves The Armory
NW 10th & Glisan	NW 11th & Glisan	Pearl District	September 22, 2012	Portland Streetcar: NS
NW 10th & Johnson	NW 11th & Johnson	Pearl District	September 22, 2012	Portland Streetcar: NS
NW 9th & Lovejoy	—	Pearl District	September 22, 2012	—
—	NW 11th & Marshall	Pearl District	September 22, 2012	—
—	NW 10th & Northrup	Pearl District	September 22, 2012	Portland Streetcar: NS
N Weidler & Ross	N Broadway & Ross	Lloyd District	September 22, 2012	Serves Rose Quarter
NE Weidler & 2nd	NE Broadway & 2nd	Lloyd District	September 22, 2012	—
NE Weidler & Grand	NE Grand & Broadway	Lloyd District	September 22, 2012	—
NE 7th & Halsey	—	Lloyd District	September 22, 2012	—
NE 7th & Holladay	NE Grand & Multnomah	Lloyd District	September 22, 2012	MAX Light Rail: Blue Line, Red Line
NE Oregon & Grand	NE Grand & Holladay	Lloyd District	September 22, 2012	MAX Light Rail: Blue Line, Red Line
Oregon Convention Center	NE Grand & Hoyt	Lloyd District	September 22, 2012	Serves Oregon Convention Center
NE MLK & Burnside	SE Grand & Burnside	Central Eastside	September 22, 2012	—
SE MLK & Stark	SE Grand & Stark	Central Eastside	September 22, 2012	—
SE MLK & Morrison	SE Grand & Morrison	Central Eastside	September 22, 2012	—
SE MLK & Taylor	SE Grand & Taylor	Central Eastside	September 22, 2012	—
SE MLK & Hawthorne	SE Grand & Hawthorne	Central Eastside	September 22, 2012	—
SE MLK & Mill	SE Grand & Mill	Central Eastside	September 22, 2012	—
OMSI		Central Eastside	September 22, 2012	MAX Light Rail: Orange Line; Frequent Express; Serves OMSI
S Moody & Meade		South Waterfront	August 30, 2015	Portland Streetcar: NS; MAX Light Rail: Orange Line; Frequent Express; Serves OHSU Robertson Life Sciences Building
S River Parkway & Moody		Downtown	August 30, 2015	Portland Streetcar: NS
SW Harrison Street		Downtown	August 30, 2015	Portland Streetcar: NS
SW 3rd & Harrison		Downtown	August 30, 2015	Portland Streetcar: NS
PSU Urban Center	SW 5th & Montgomery	Downtown	August 30, 2015	Portland Streetcar: NS; MAX Light Rail: Orange Line, Yellow Line; Frequent Express; Serves Portland State University
—	SW 5th & Market	Downtown	August 30, 2015	Portland Streetcar: NS; Serves Portland State University
SW Park & Mill	SW Park & Market	Downtown	August 30, 2015	Portland Streetcar: NS

Images of A and B Loop stations
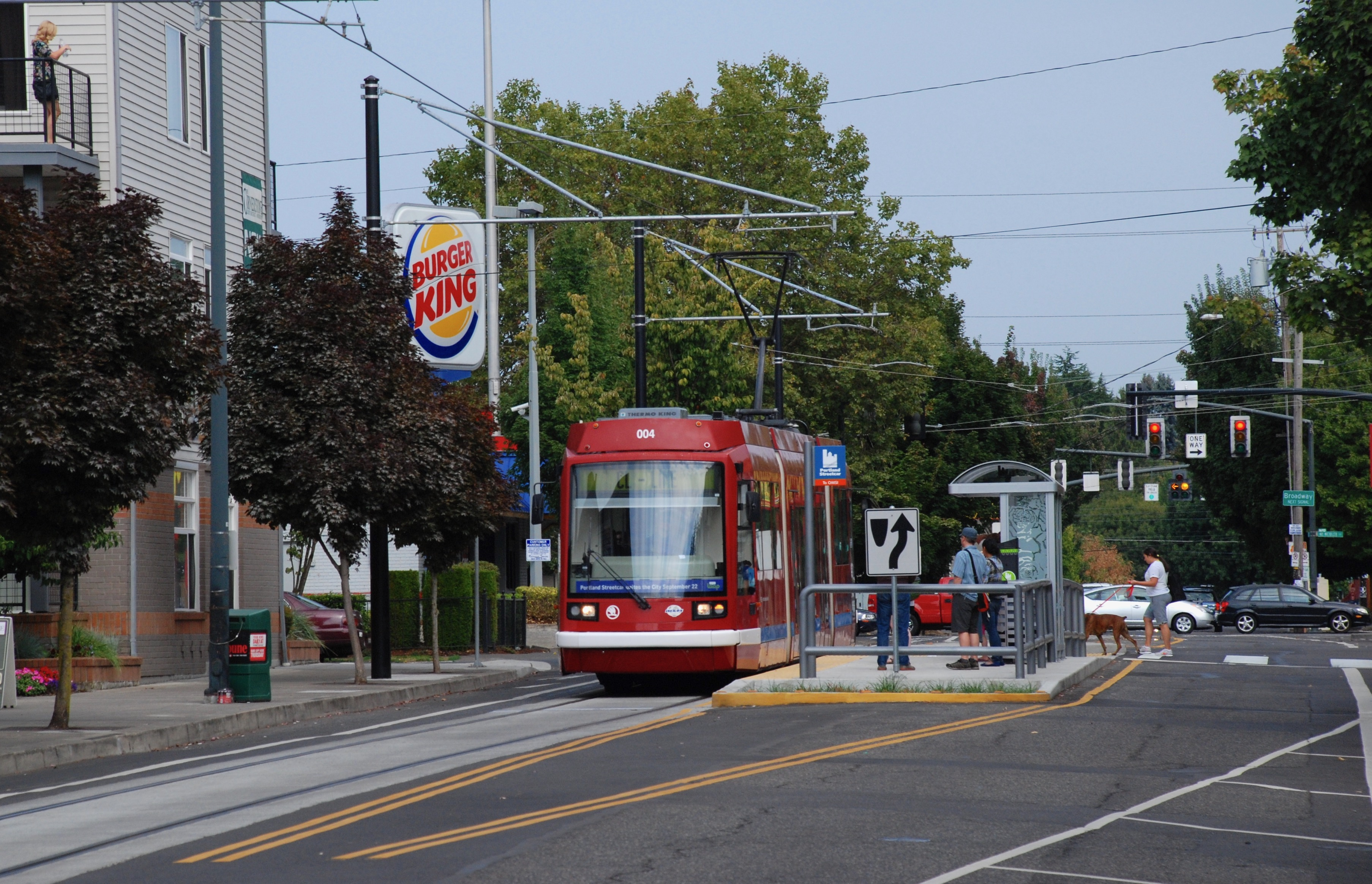
NE 7th & Halsey station

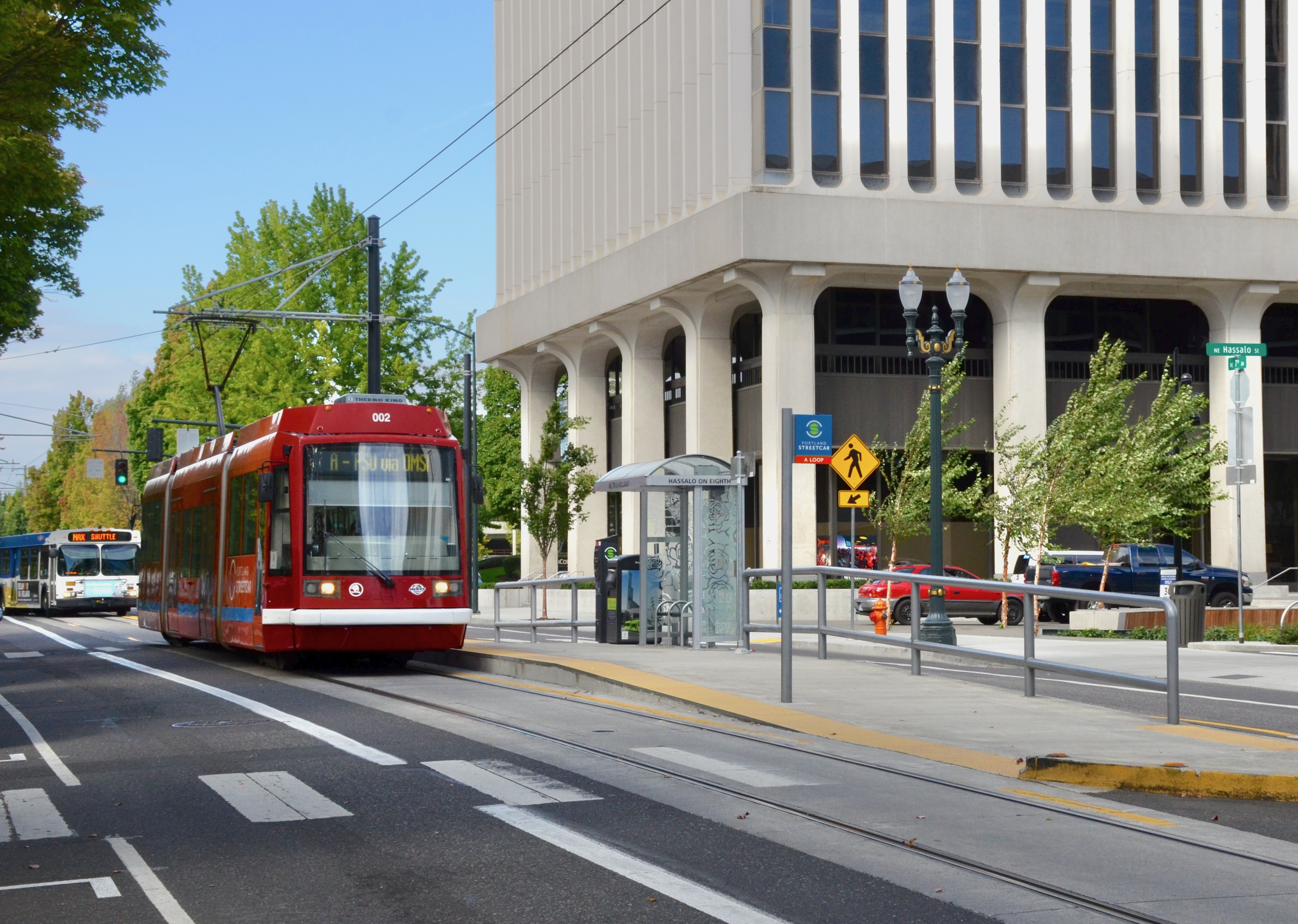
NE 7th & Holladay station

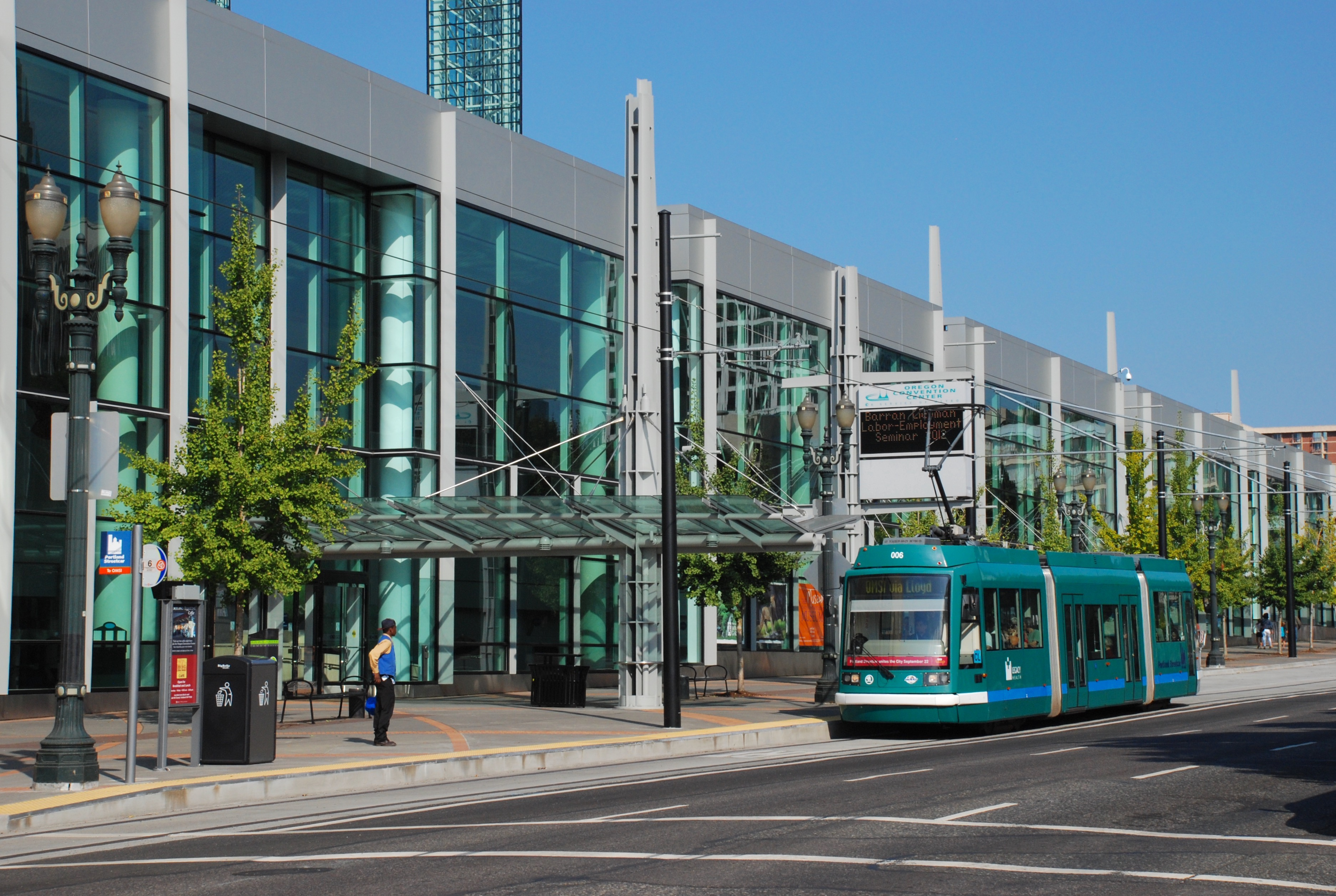
Oregon Convention Center station
