= Frequent Express =

High capacity bus route in Portland, Oregon, U.S.

FX2–Division
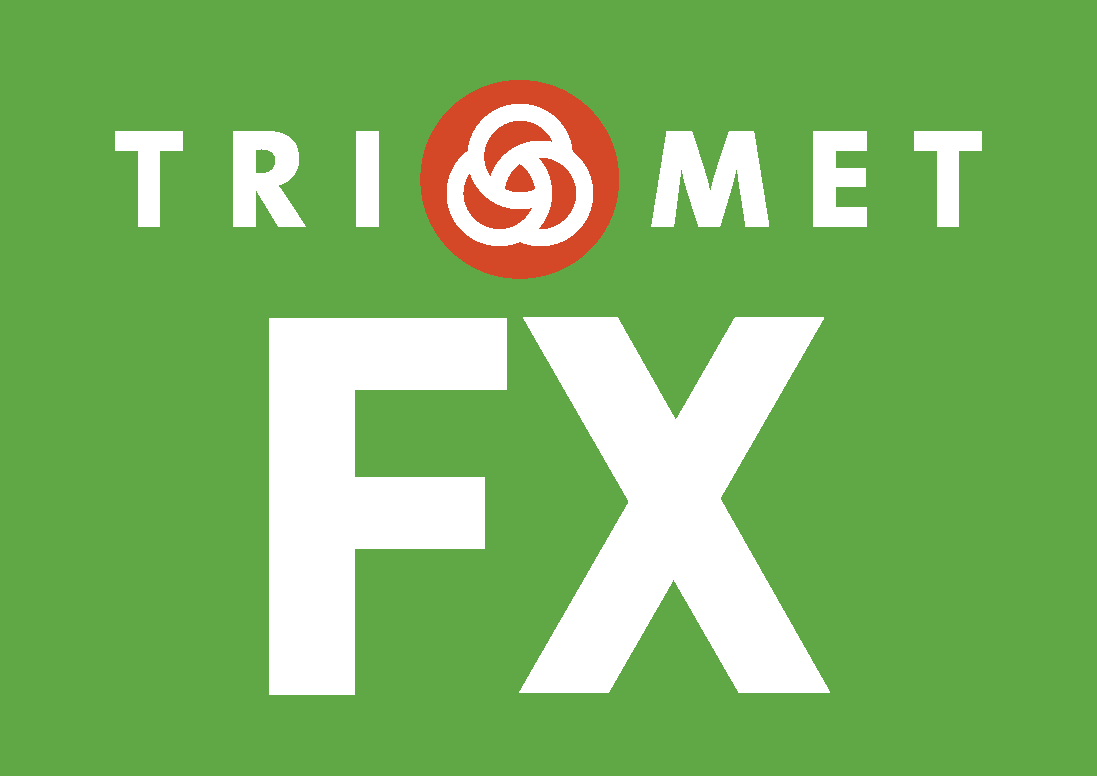

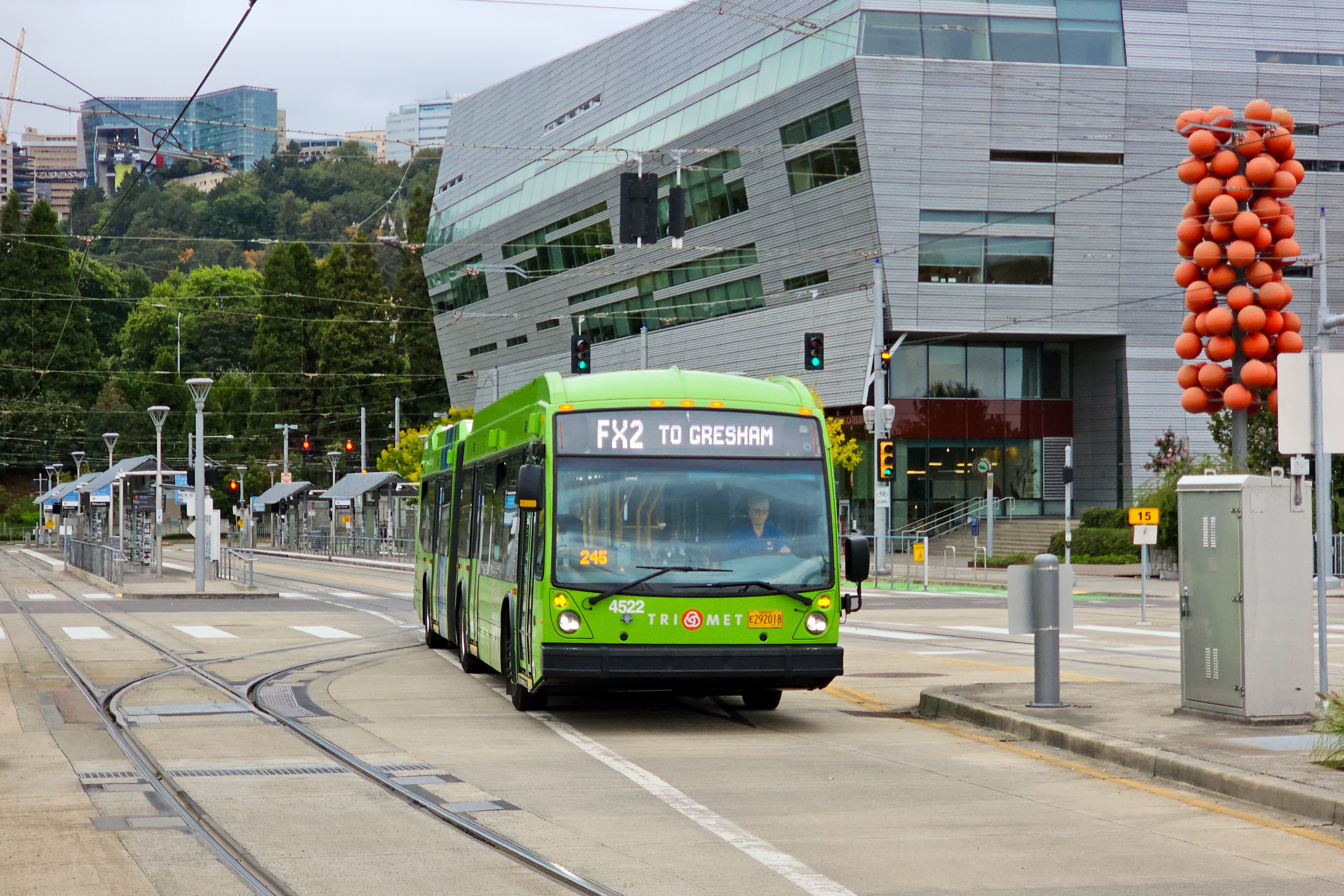
- An FX2 bus departing South Waterfront/S Moody station in Portland

Overview
- System: Frequent Express
- Operator: TriMet
- Garage: Powell
- Vehicle: Nova Bus LFS articulated
- Status: Operational
- Began service: September 18, 2022
- Predecessors: 2–Division

Route
- Locale: Portland, Oregon, U.S.
- Start: NW 5th & Hoyt, Union Station
- Via: Portland Transit Mall, Division Street
- End: Cleveland Park and Ride, Gresham
- Length: 15 mi (24 km)
- Stations: 47

Service
- Level: Daily
- Frequency: 12 minutes
- Daily ridership: 8,100 (Spring 2024)

Frequent Express (FX) is a rapid bus (Note: "Rapid bus" is defined by the Portland metropolitan area's regional government, Metro, as "rubber-tired [high capacity transit] (HCT) modes that include fixed guideway bus rapid transit (BRT) and frequent express (FX)-style corridor-based BRT services. In general, these services offer the core elements of HCT including transit priority, exclusive guideways, enhanced amenities, and frequent, branded service.") service in Portland, Oregon, United States. Operated by TriMet as FX2–Division, the 15-mile (24 km) route runs east–west from Union Station in downtown Portland to Cleveland Avenue Park and Ride in Gresham via the Portland Transit Mall, Tilikum Crossing, and Division Street. It serves Portland City Center, Portland State University (PSU), South Waterfront, Southeast Portland, and central Gresham and connects with MAX Light Rail and the Portland Streetcar.

FX features bus rapid transit (BRT) design elements such as dedicated lanes, transit signal priority, and articulated buses with all-door boarding, the second such service in the Portland metropolitan area after The Vine in Vancouver, Washington. Fares are collected through the Hop Fastpass payment system.

The Portland metropolitan area's regional government, Metro, adopted the Regional High Capacity Transit System Plan in 2009 and initially identified Powell Boulevard between downtown Portland and Gresham as a priority corridor for public transit investment. Subsequent planning, however, resulted in a bus route alternative farther north along Division Street. Construction of the Division Transit Project began in October 2019, and the FX2–Division route began operating on September 18, 2022.

== History ==
=== Planning ===
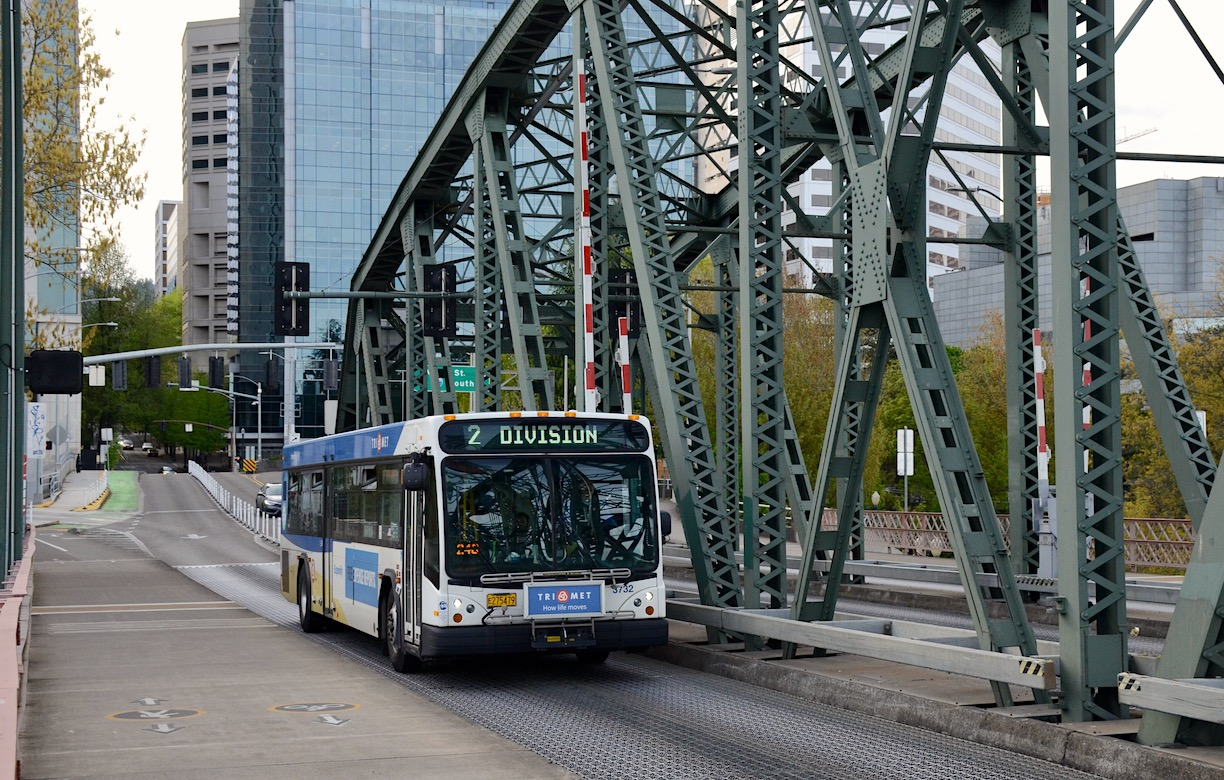
A TriMet bus on route 2–Division on the Hawthorne Bridge, which ceased to be part of the Division Street bus service's route when FX replaced route 2 and shifted to Tilikum Crossing

High-capacity transit (HCT) (Note: "High capacity transit" (HCT) is defined by the Portland metropolitan area's regional government, Metro, as "public transit that has an exclusive right of way, a non-exclusive right of way or a combination of both" where "vehicles make fewer stops, travel at higher speeds, have more frequent service and carry more people than local service transit such as typical bus lines".) planning for the Portland metropolitan area, previously evaluated in the 1982 Light Rail System Plan, was updated by Metro, the regional government, when it adopted the Regional High Capacity Transit System Plan on July 9, 2009. The updated plan identified corridors viable for HCT and deemed Powell Boulevard between downtown Portland and the eastern suburb of Gresham a "near-term regional priority". Four years later, Metro and the region's transit agency, TriMet, began studying alignment and mode alternatives for the corridor, as well as for Division Street several blocks farther north, with BRT, light rail, and streetcar under consideration. At the time, Powell and Division were served by bus routes 9–Powell Blvd and 4–Division/Fessenden, respectively, which together carried more than 17,000 riders daily.

In 2014, a steering committee for the Powell–Division Transit and Development Project was formed, whose members voted that September to discontinue studying rail alternatives in favor of bus-only options, citing fewer property and roadway impacts and a shorter construction time. Conceptual design work began two months later. The following year, plans for dedicated bus lanes, a key feature of BRT, were abandoned; planners defended this decision by claiming that reducing car lanes would "likely result in traffic diversion to other streets and significant delay". The system would use transit signal priority to move buses quickly instead.

The steering committee initially wanted a route that would use Powell Boulevard on its westernmost section, head north to Division Street somewhere between 52nd and 92nd avenues, and terminate at Mt. Hood Community College (MHCC) in Gresham. In March 2016, a study conducted by TriMet revealed that this preferred route would take approximately 11 minutes longer to travel than the existing bus service. It was also estimated to exceed $200 million; to ensure federal funding was acquired, a target cost was set at $175 million. The steering committee recommended a locally preferred alternative (LPA) on November 7, 2016. The LPA dropped the Powell segment in favor of a Division Street-only alignment, with a route through the Portland Transit Mall instead of Columbia and Jefferson streets in downtown Portland. The steering committee had remained undecided on whether the route would use the Hawthorne Bridge or Tilikum Crossing to cross the Willamette River, but TriMet planners later opted to use Tilikum Crossing. The LPA had also scaled back the route's eastern end to terminate at Gresham Central Transit Center, rather than at MHCC, to lower cost, but subsequent LPA refinements re-extended the route slightly farther east to the Cleveland Avenue MAX station.

Metro transferred the project to TriMet in December 2016, and TriMet renamed it the "Division Transit Project". The design contract for stations, traffic signals, and civil infrastructure improvements was awarded to WSP USA the following year. In September 2018, scheduled service changes split bus route 4–Division/Fessenden into two lines, and a new 2–Division line took over the Division Transit Project route on the east side. The following month, TriMet unveiled a mock-up station in Gresham with a borrowed articulated bus from C-Tran, the transit agency serving Clark County, Washington, to simulate boarding. In March 2019, TriMet issued a request for proposals (RFP) for the procurement of 60-foot (18 m) articulated buses and received responses from BYD Auto, New Flyer, and Nova Bus. During an initial evaluation process, TriMet noted that the battery electric buses proposed by BYD and New Flyer did not meet the RFP's specifications and eliminated the bus type from further consideration. That August, TriMet selected Nova as the manufacturer and, in the following month, placed an initial order for 31 diesel buses with an option to purchase as many as 159 diesel and hybrid electric bus alternatives.

=== Funding and construction ===
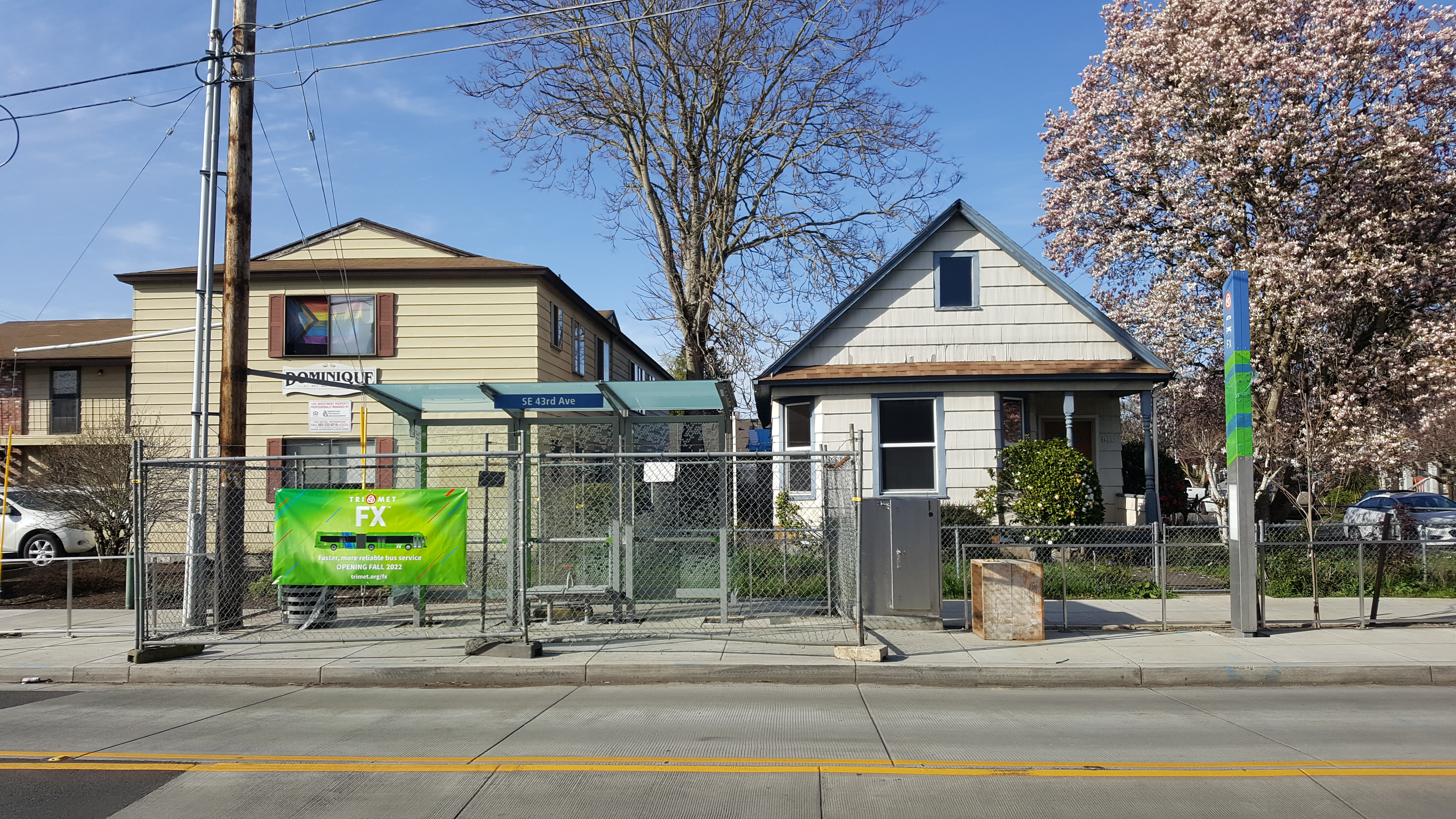
SE 43rd Ave station in March 2022 during construction

The Division Transit Project was estimated at $175 million, half of which was anticipated to be funded by the Federal Transit Administration (FTA) under the Small Starts program. In August 2018, the Portland City Council authorized $17.7 million to cover its share of local funding, sourced through developer fees, and Gresham allocated $500,000 the following month. The project received tentative approval from the FTA for $87.4 million in April 2019, and was formally awarded the grant on January 23, 2020. Federal Highway Administration funds contributed another $27.9 million, while $40.7 million from TriMet, $240,000 from Metro, $150,000 from the Oregon Department of Transportation, and $130,000 from Multnomah County covered the remaining local share.

TriMet appointed Portland-based Raimore Construction, a certified disadvantaged business enterprise (DBE), as the Division Transit Project's general contractor. It was the largest contract ever awarded in Oregon to a DBE—a business majority-owned by women or minorities. DBEs ultimately completed at least 84 percent of the overall project. Early construction work began in October 2019. Work was split into three zones on the east side and progressed concurrently from east to west. Construction of the first station platforms had begun by June 2020. By October, 19 platforms had been poured, and seven bioswales and five pedestrian safety islands had been built. Crews completed around 40 percent of the project within the first year despite working through the COVID-19 pandemic. In April 2021, TriMet opened the first two upgraded stations at 130th Avenue eastbound and 135th Avenue westbound for use by buses on the existing 2–Division route. That June, TriMet unveiled the articulated bus that would serve the project and announced that the service would be called "Frequent Express", or "FX". Operator training of the new buses started in April 2022.

While building the Division Transit Project, TriMet collaborated with the Portland Bureau of Transportation's (PBOT) Outer Division Safety Project, which focused on an area between 80th and 174th avenues, for additional safety improvements; PBOT lowered the speed limit to 30 miles per hour (48 km/h), installed speed cameras and more street lighting, filled in sidewalks, and painted signalized crosswalks.

=== Opening and impact ===
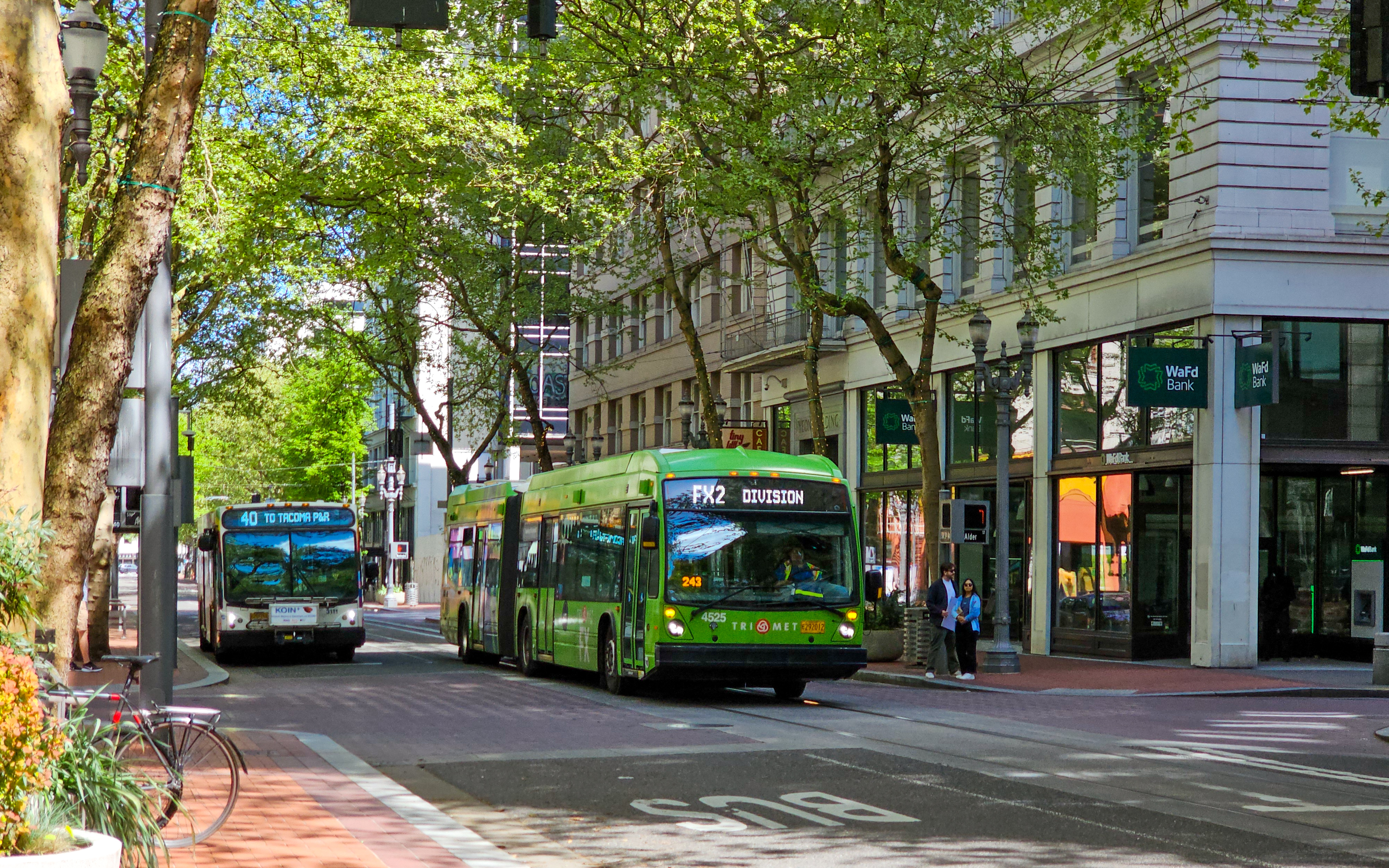
An FX2 bus seen on the Portland Transit Mall in April 2025

In June 2022, TriMet announced service level reductions for 10 bus routes, including the future FX2–Division route, due to a lack of operators. The operator shortage was the largest in the agency's history, and it was attributed to competition from other transit and delivery services and safety concerns amid an increase in assaults on drivers. In its application for FTA funding, TriMet had promised service frequencies on FX2–Division as often as six minutes; as a result of the driver shortage, service was reduced to every 12 minutes.

TriMet held a grand opening celebration for FX on September 17, 2022. Festival venues included OMSI/Southeast Water station, Portland Community College Southeast campus, and Gresham Central Transit Center. FX rides between the sites were free, and the Portland Streetcar also offered free rides to encourage people to transfer to FX and attend the festivities. FX2–Division began revenue service the following day, on September 18.

Several weeks after opening, the Willamette Week published an article that compared the travel times of FX2–Division with the former 2–Division route. TriMet had estimated that service would be 15 to 20 percent faster than the original route, which took 66 minutes to travel from Gresham to downtown Portland; the article claimed that FX took 67 minutes at peak commute hours for the same trip.

== Future plans ==
FX routes are planned for 82nd Avenue in Portland and the Tualatin Valley Highway (Oregon Route 8) between Beaverton and Forest Grove. In January 2023, Metro ranked both corridors as "Tier 1" investment priorities, identifying them as "corridors that are ready and where new high capacity transit connections are currently planned for the near-term".

=== 82nd Avenue ===
82nd Avenue is planned to be TriMet's second FX route. The route would run the length of 82nd Avenue from Clackamas Town Center north to the Cully neighborhood. Metro established a steering committee for the 82nd Avenue transit project in June 2022. Construction is projected to begin in 2026, and the line is expected to open in 2029. The line will use 60-foot articulated New Flyer XHE60 fuel cell buses.

=== Tualatin Valley Highway ===
Tualatin Valley Highway is planned to be Trimet's third FX route. The route would run the length of Tualatin Valley Highway between Beaverton Transit Center and Hillsboro and would then run west to Forest Grove, similar to the current 57. Construction is set to begin in 2028, and the line is expected to open in 2030. Unlike the other two FX routes, this one will not use articulated buses.

== Route ==
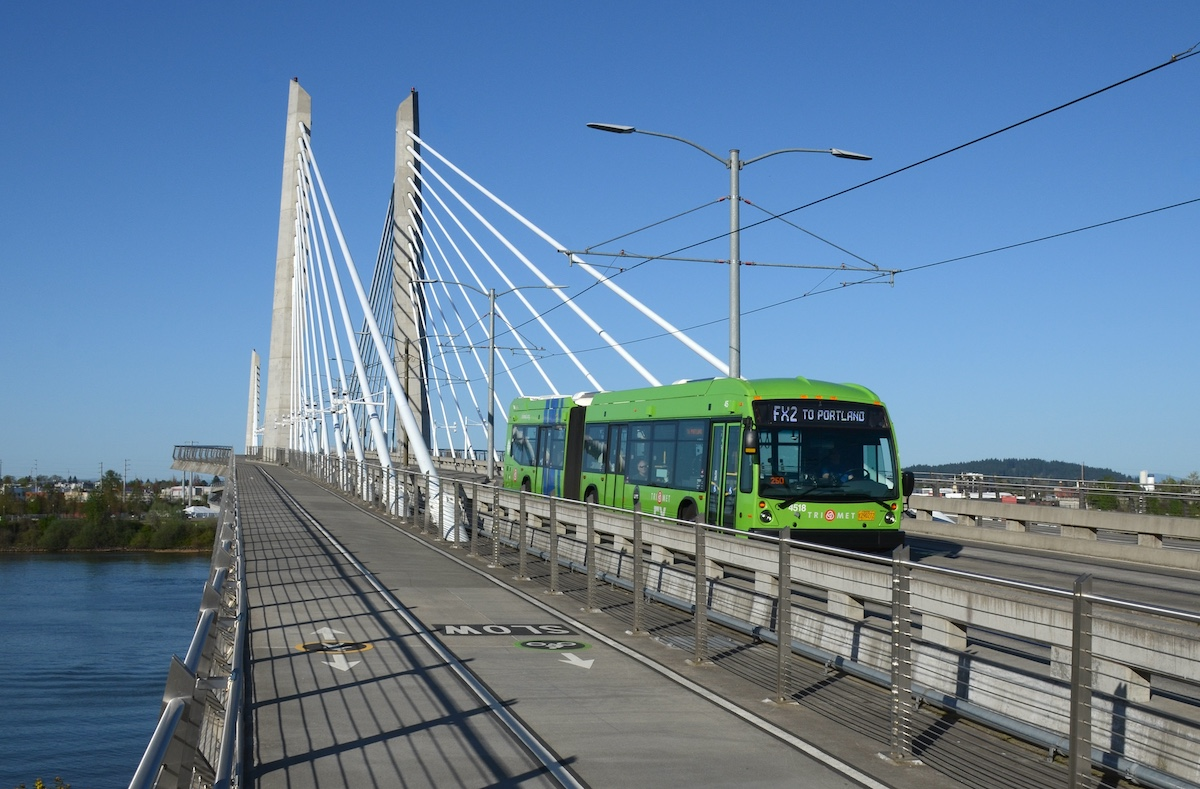
FX2 uses the transit-only Tilikum Crossing to cross the Willamette River.

FX2–Division begins at the northern end of the Portland Transit Mall on Irving Street and 5th Avenue near Union Station in downtown Portland, with 5th and Hoyt station as its western terminus. Within the transit mall, buses travel in a one-way pair: Portland-bound on 6th Avenue and Gresham-bound on 5th Avenue, except on a segment between Lincoln and Hall streets where Portland-bound buses run along 4th Avenue. From Lincoln Street, the route follows the shared Portland–Milwaukie light rail alignment eastward through Harbor Viaduct and Tilikum Crossing. It diverges from this shared alignment on 7th Avenue and circles a block before entering Division Street on 8th Avenue. The route stays along Division Street through Southeast Portland and Gresham until Roberts Avenue, where it turns for 8th Street and terminates at the Cleveland Avenue station park and ride. Portland-bound buses in central Gresham turn from 8th Street back to Division Street via Kelley Avenue.

=== Stations ===
FX2–Division serves 42 stations within the cities of Portland and Gresham, primarily along Division Street. They are spaced an average 1/3 mile (0.54 km) apart, and their locations were selected based on demand, safety, connections to other transit routes, and key destinations. Stops east of Division Street and 11th Avenue were built as part of the Division Transit Project; four station types were designed to accommodate right-of-way restrictions, with stations along the outer parts of the route (east of 82nd Avenue) built larger with more amenities. Station areas vary in length, from 48 to 56 feet (14.6 to 17.1 m), and typically consist of a shelter, station marker, trashcan, and utility cabinet. Shelters also vary in length, from 8 to 20 feet (2.4 to 6.1 m), and are glass-covered. Platforms are long enough to accommodate simultaneous boarding of the three-door buses, and larger stations are wider to incorporate bicycle lanes.

List of FX2–Division stations
Station		Location	Connections and notes
Eastbound	Westbound	Location	Connections and notes
NW 5th & Hoyt	—	Portland; Transit; Mall	Transfer to Amtrak, MAX (Orange, Yellow)
NW 5th & Davis	NW 6th & Flanders	Portland; Transit; Mall	Transfer to MAX (Orange, Yellow)
SW 5th & Washington	SW 6th & Harvey Milk	Portland; Transit; Mall	Transfer to MAX (Orange, Yellow)
SW 5th & Salmon	SW 6th & Taylor	Portland; Transit; Mall	Transfer to MAX (Blue, Orange, Red, Yellow)
SW 5th & Columbia	SW 6th & Columbia	Portland; Transit; Mall	Transfer to MAX (Orange, Yellow)
SW 5th & Hall	SW Hall & 5th	Portland; Transit; Mall	Transfer to MAX (Orange, Yellow), Portland Streetcar (A/B, NS)
SW Lincoln & 1st		Southwest; Portland	Transfer to MAX (Orange)
South Waterfront/S Moody		South; Portland	Transfer to MAX (Orange), Portland Streetcar (A/B, NS)
OMSI/SE Water		Southeast; Portland	Transfer to MAX (Orange), Portland Streetcar (A/B)
SE 11th/12th Ave		Southeast; Portland	—
SE 20th Ave		Southeast; Portland	—
SE 26th Ave		Southeast; Portland	—
SE 30th Ave		Southeast; Portland	—
SE 34th Ave		Southeast; Portland	—
SE Cesar Chavez Blvd		Southeast; Portland	—
SE 43rd Ave		Southeast; Portland	—
SE 51st Ave		Southeast; Portland	—
SE 59th/60th Ave		Southeast; Portland	—
SE 67th/68th Ave		Southeast; Portland	—
SE 75th/76th Ave		Southeast; Portland	—
SE 82nd Ave		Southeast; Portland	—
SE 85th/87th Ave		Southeast; Portland	—
SE Division St MAX Station		Southeast; Portland	Transfer to MAX (Green)
SE 101st Ave		Southeast; Portland	—
11100 Block/SE 113th Ave		Southeast; Portland	—
SE 116th Ave		Southeast; Portland	—
SE 122nd Ave		Southeast; Portland	—
SE 130th Ave		Southeast; Portland	—
SE 135th/136th Ave		Southeast; Portland	—
SE 142nd Ave/14200 Block		Southeast; Portland	—
SE 148th Ave		Southeast; Portland	—
SE 157th Ave		Southeast; Portland	—
SE 162nd Ave		Southeast; Portland	—
SE 168th Ave		Southeast; Portland	—
SE 174th Ave		Southeast; Portland	—
18000/18200 Block		Gresham	—
NW Eastwood Ave		Gresham	—
NW Angeline St		Gresham	—
NW Civic Dr/Overlook Ave		Gresham	—
NW Eastman Pkwy/Gresham City Hall Park & Ride		Gresham	Transfer to MAX (Blue)
Gresham Central Transit Center		Gresham	Transfer to MAX (Blue), Sandy Area Metro
Cleveland Ave Park & Ride		Gresham	Transfer to MAX (Blue)

Images of FX–2 Division stations
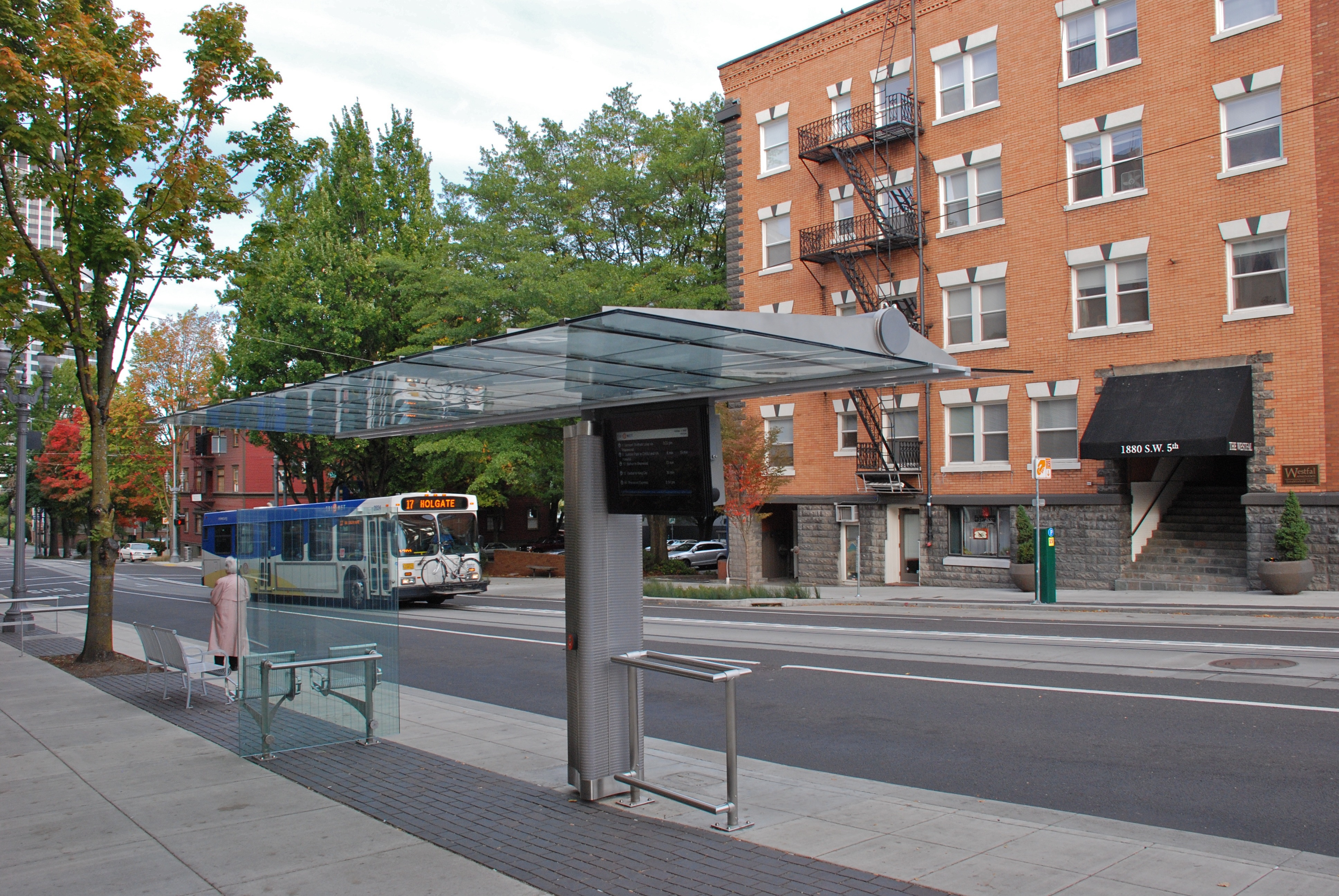
SW 5th & Hall station on the Portland Transit Mall

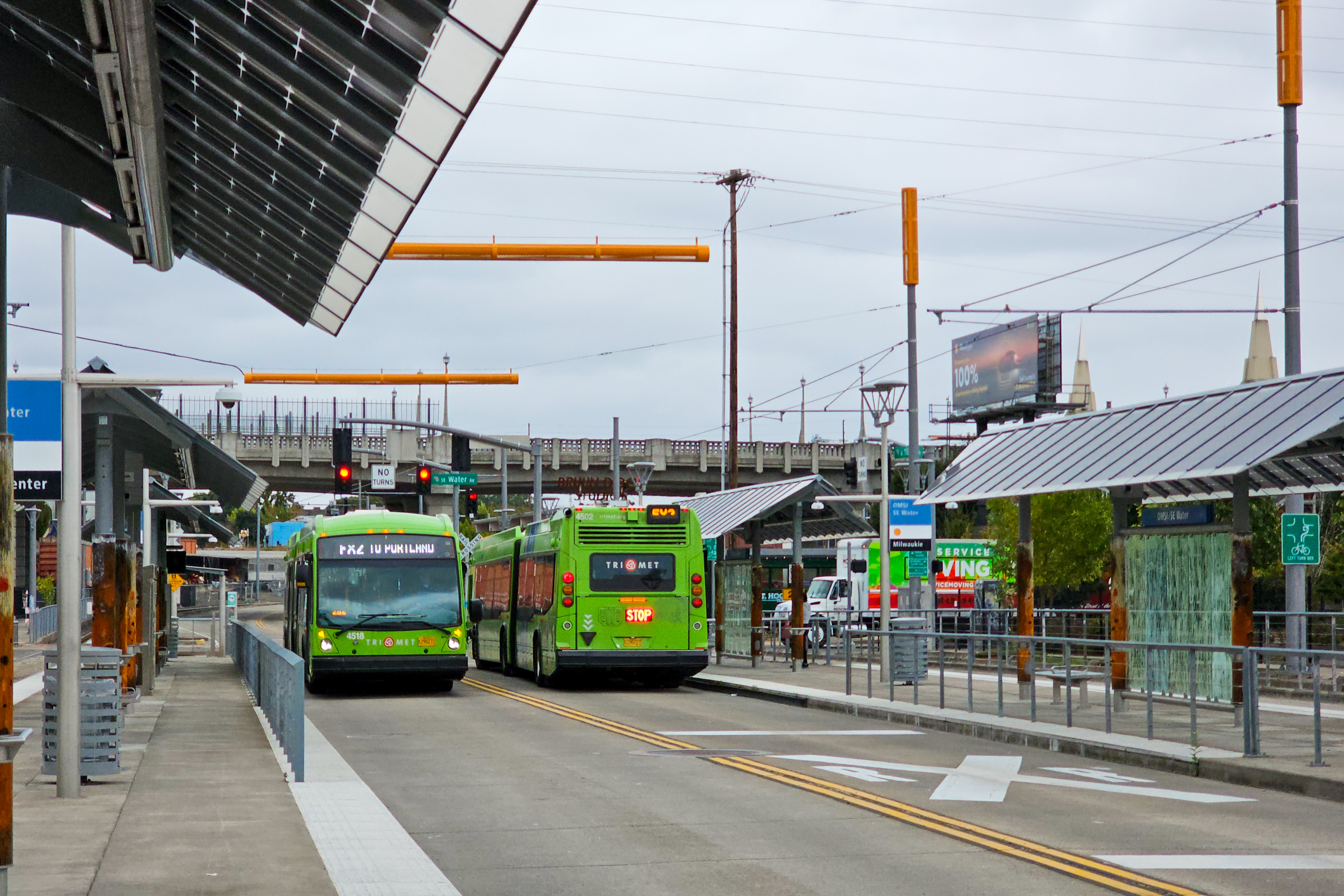
OMSI/SE Water station

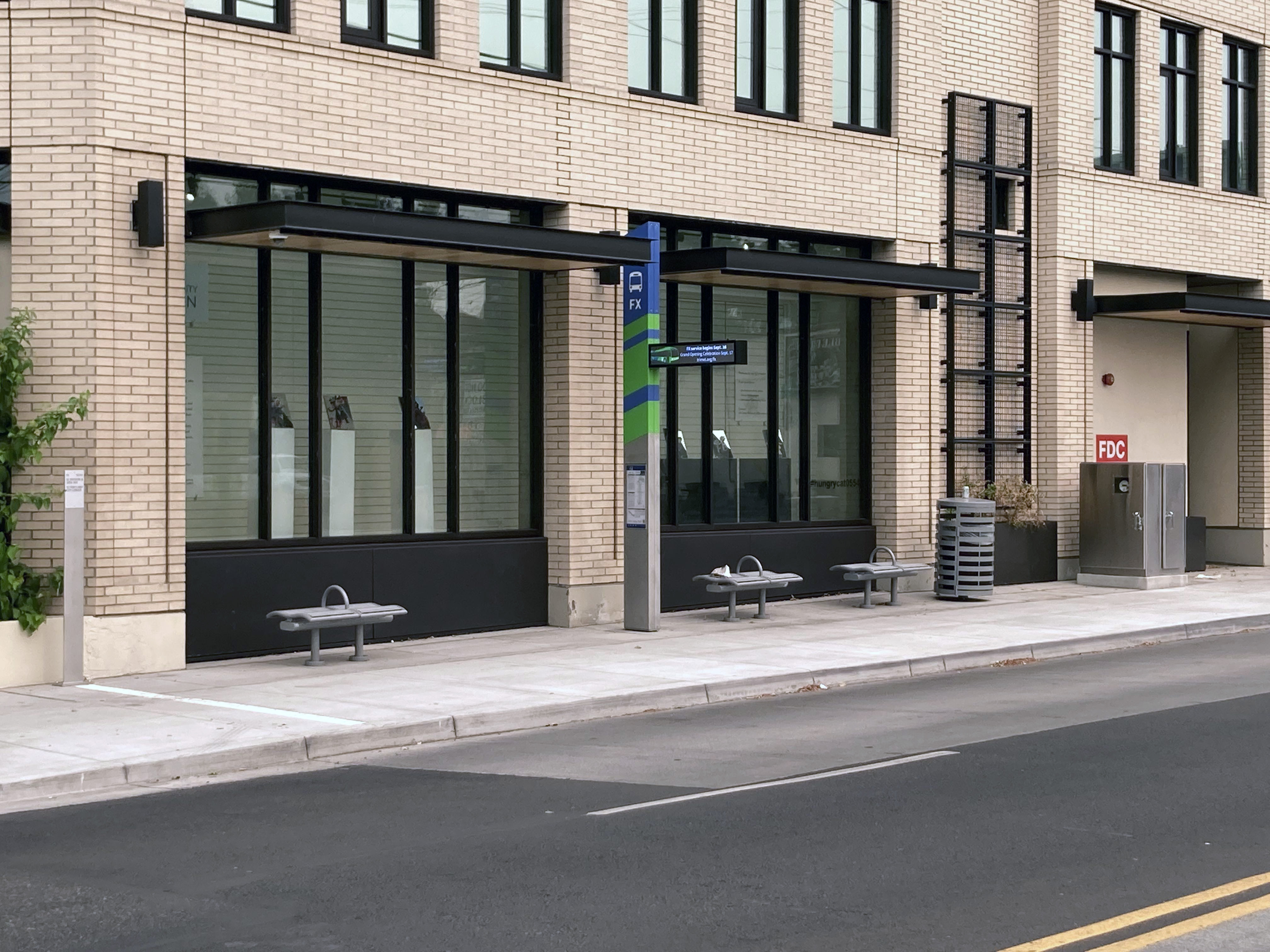
Westbound SE 20th Ave station

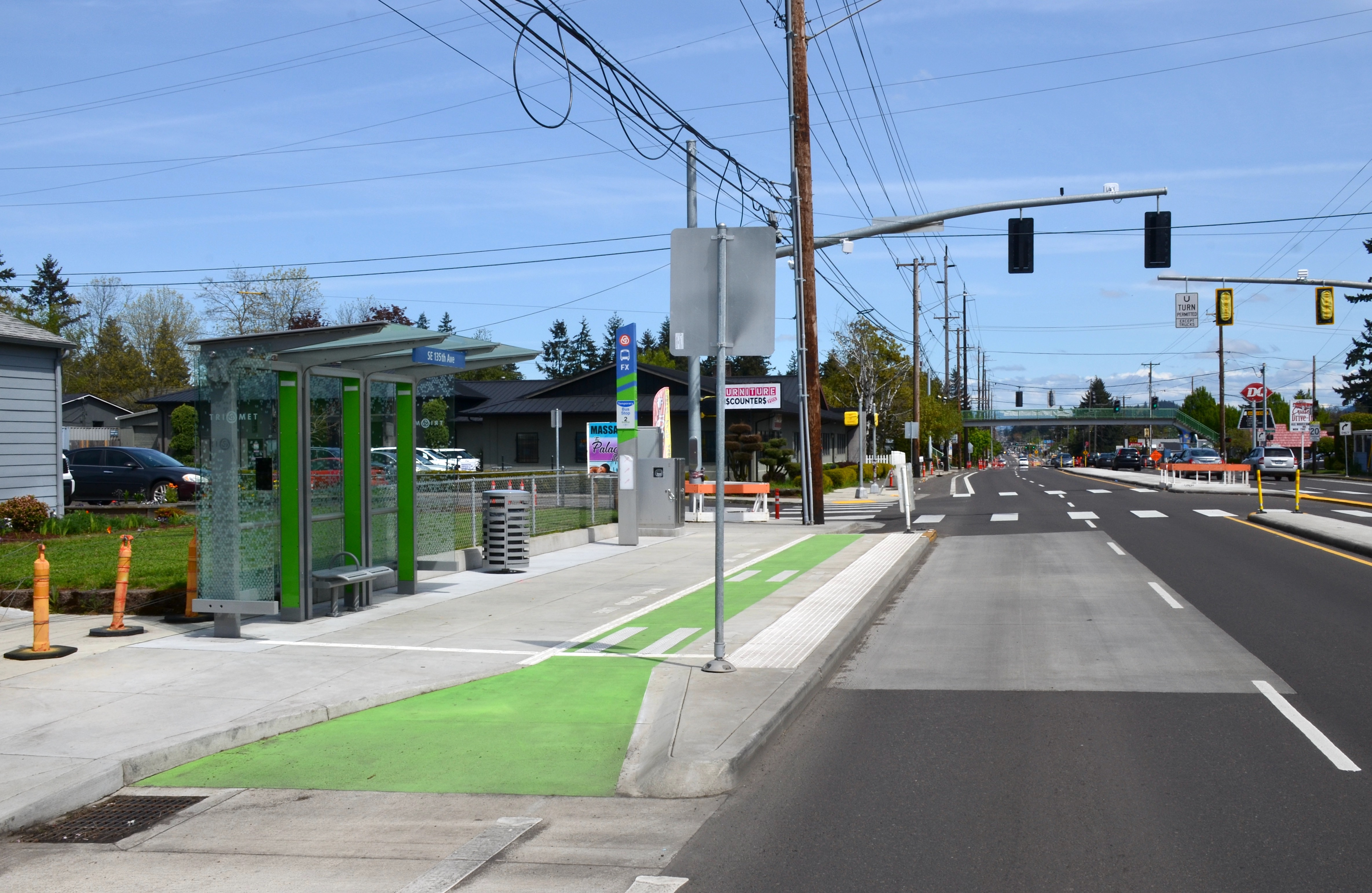
SE 135th Ave station. Green paint marks the bike lane.

== Design ==
FX features BRT design elements such as dedicated bus lanes, transit signal priority, and 60-foot (18 m) buses with all-door boarding. It is the second such service in the Portland metropolitan area after The Vine in Vancouver, Washington.

=== Dedicated lanes and transit signal priority ===
Segments of the FX2–Division route use transit-only lanes, particularly west of 11th Avenue. Along the Portland Transit Mall in downtown Portland, FX buses travel in lanes dedicated to transit buses and light rail vehicles, separated from private vehicle traffic. FX2–Division travels the remainder of its route through Division Street in mixed traffic, but it uses transit signal priority to move quickly. TriMet contracted LYT, a firm based in Santa Clara, California that develops solutions for public transit, to implement transit signal priority for the Division Transit Project. LYT's cloud-based solution, called "LYT.transit", was installed inside FX buses and at 58 signalized intersections along Division Street. The technology allows each bus to send its speed and location to a cloud server, which then relays the information to the traffic signals; it uses artificial intelligence to track all buses in real-time and adapt the phasing of traffic lights to keep buses moving.

=== Fleet ===
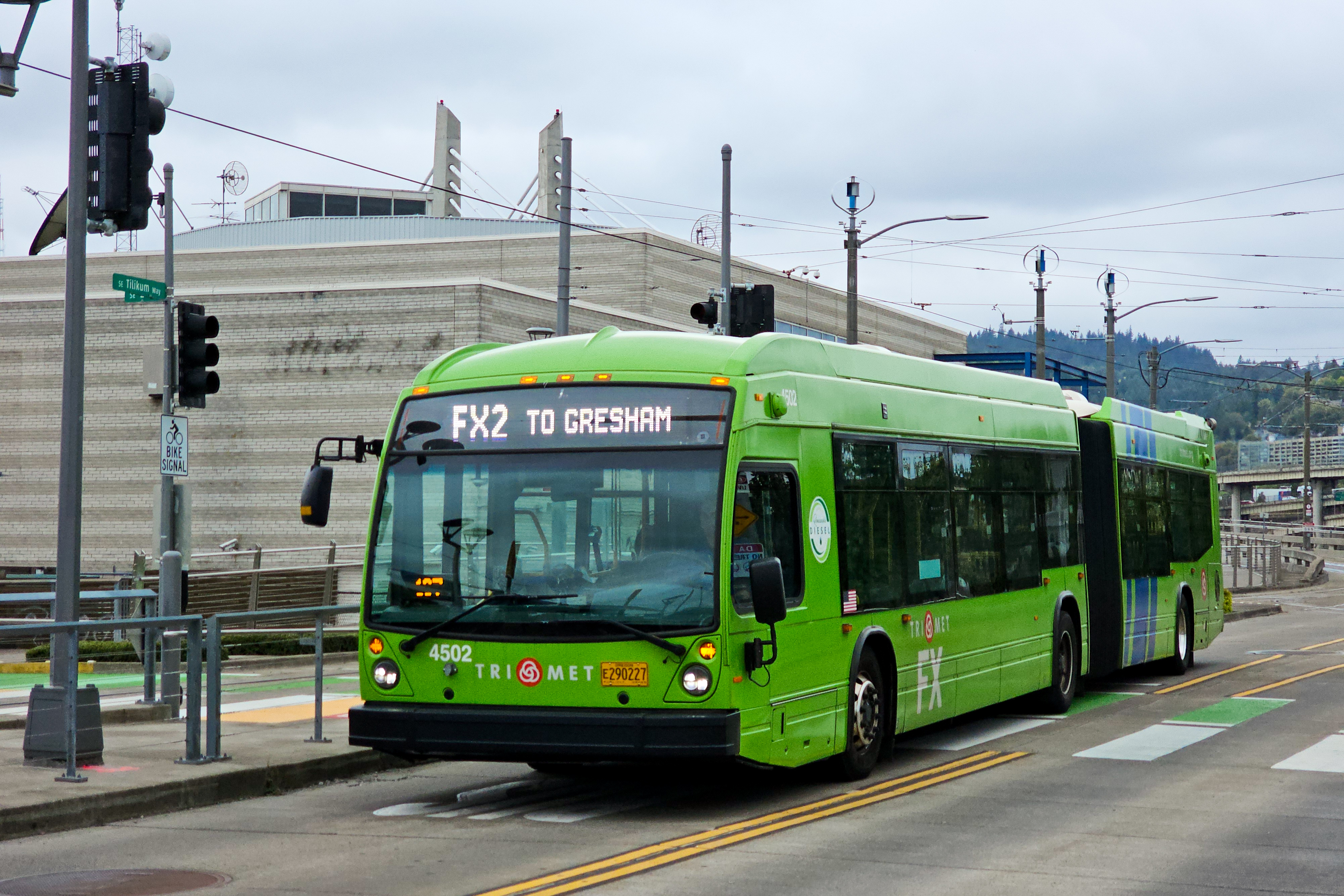
The front of an FX bus

FX operates a fleet of 31 60-foot (18.3 m) articulated buses; they were manufactured by Nova Bus in Plattsburgh, New York. Each bus can carry up to 115 passengers, 60% more than TriMet's standard 40-foot (12.2 m) bus, and features all-door, right-side boarding via three doors. Up to two bicycles can be stored inside the bus using roll-in racks located near the rear.

On November 2, 2022, TriMet announced that it would replace the articulated Nova Bus fleet with standard 40-foot (12 m) buses following the discovery of mechanical issues. A driver comment about noises while steering prompted an inspection of buses that found loose or missing fasteners. A recall was issued by Nova Bus on November 15 that affected the FX fleet, and the buses were removed from service for repairs and testing. The articulated buses were redeployed on January 29, 2023.

Interior of an FX bus
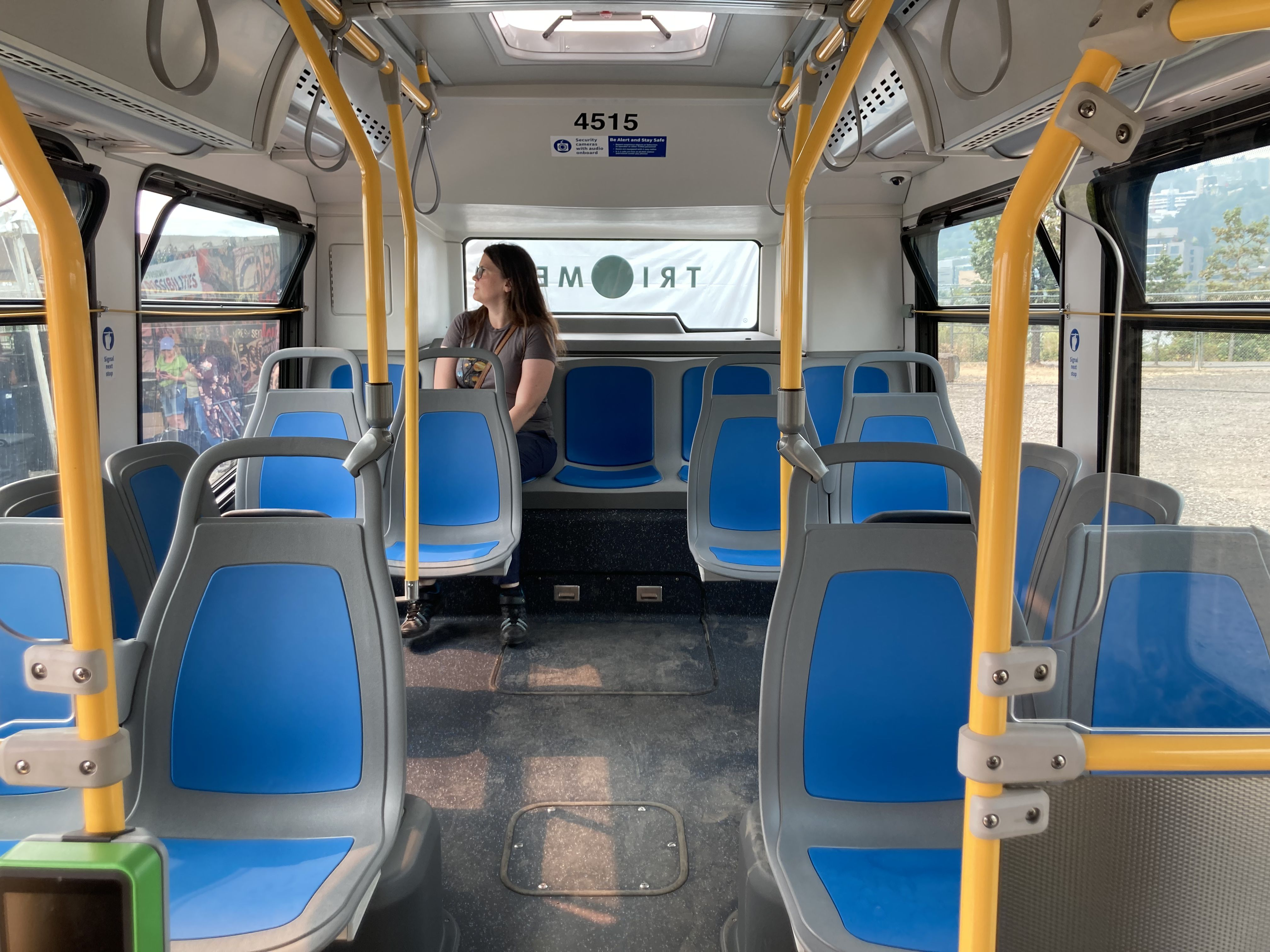
Rear seats of an FX bus

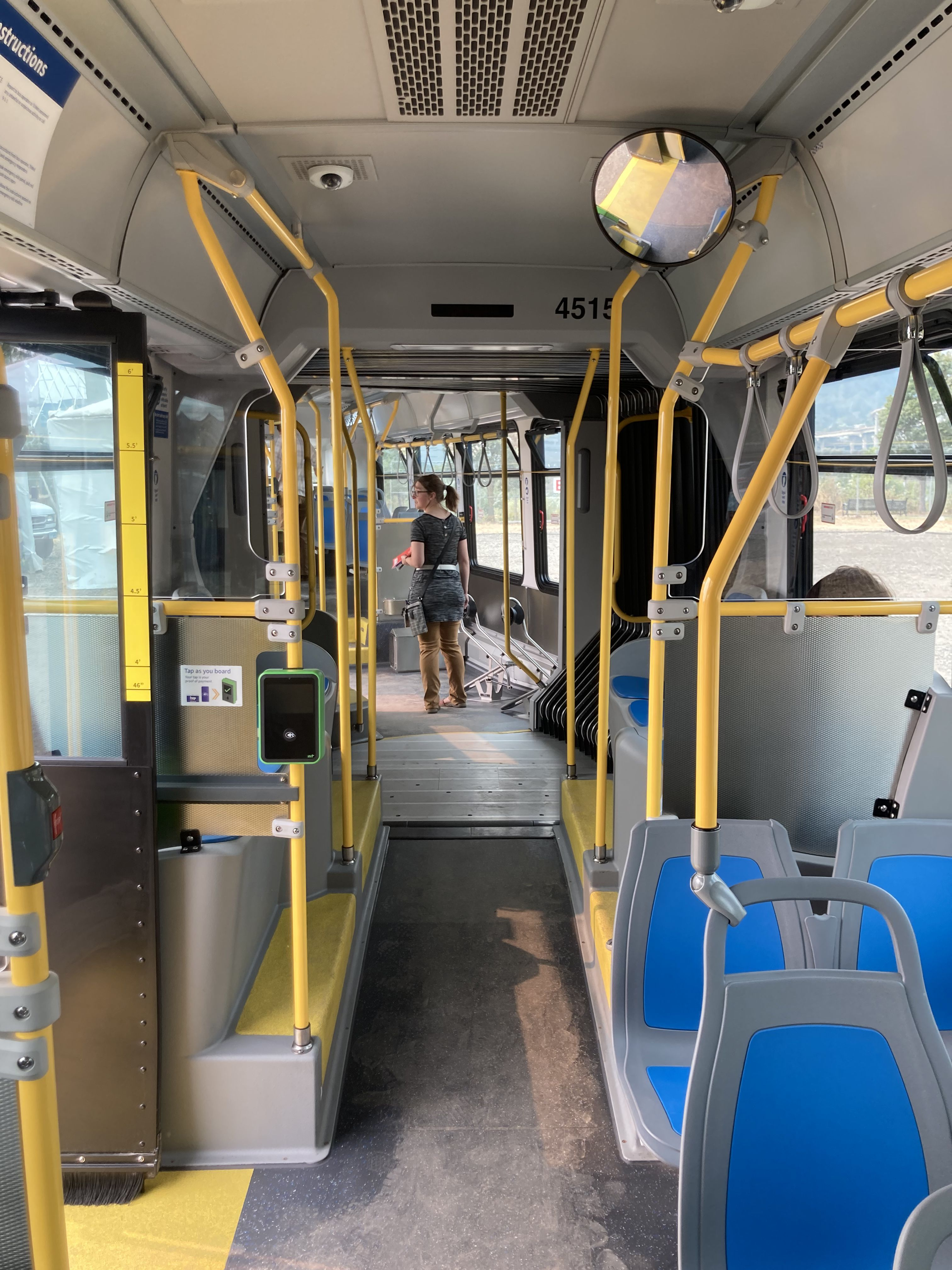
Interior of an FX bus, with Hop Fastpass card reader visible by middle door of vehicle

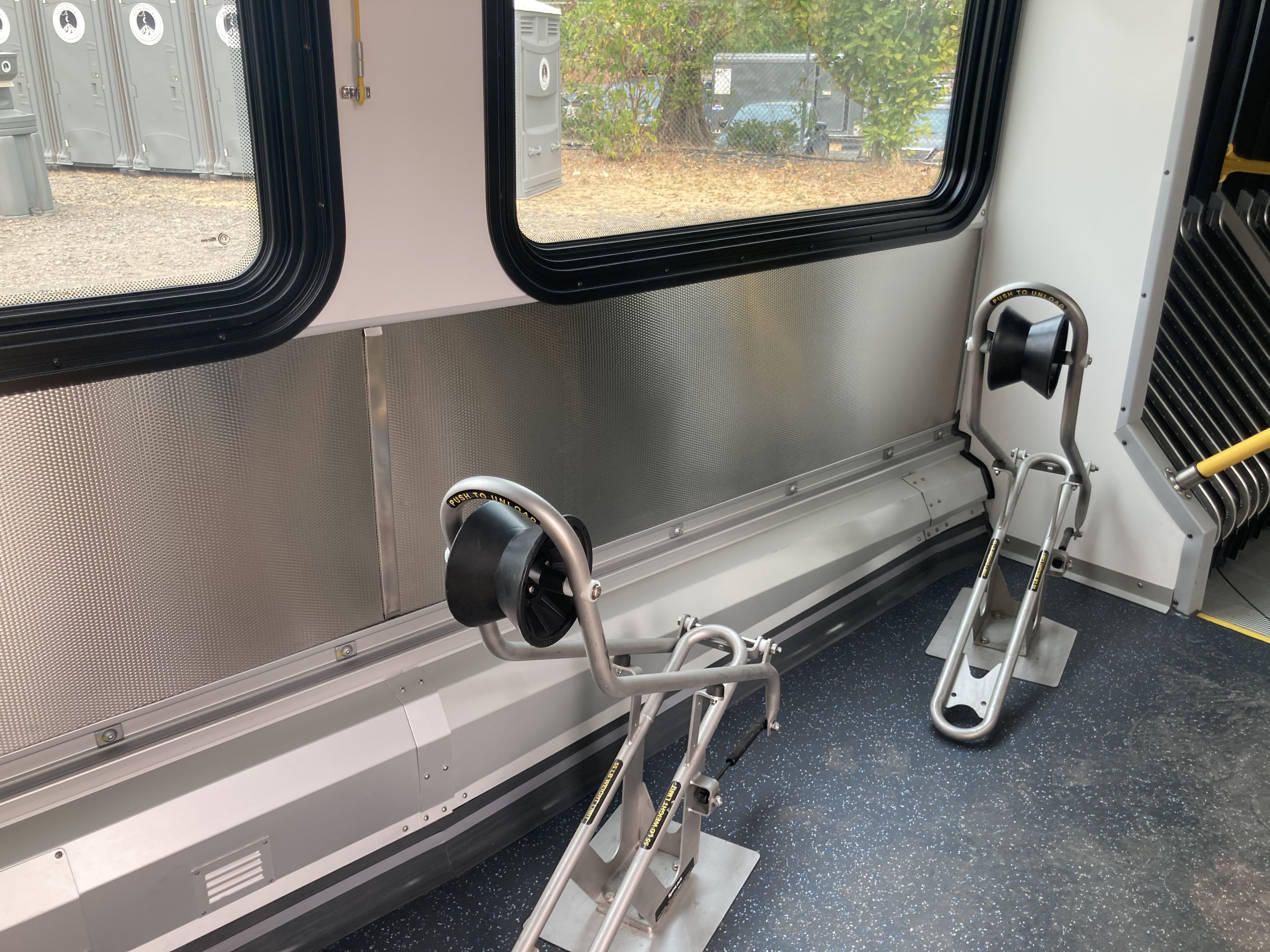
Bicycle racks inside an FX bus

== Service and ridership ==
FX2–Division operates daily with service from 4:04 am to 2:35 am the following day on weekdays, and 4:26 am to 1:39 am on Saturdays and Sundays. Buses run with a headway of 12 minutes during most of the day; they run more frequently during weekday rush hours and less frequently during the early mornings and late evenings. Fares are collected using the Hop Fastpass payment system. Card readers located on board next to each of the bus's three doors. Riders paying with cash must board at the front door, where there is a farebox and a ticket printer.

In Fall 2022, TriMet recorded 5,860 rides during weekdays at a cost per ride of $6.93. The agency had recorded 4,470 weekday rides on the former 2–Division line in Spring 2022, an increase of 23.7 percent. However, ridership remains below pre-pandemic levels with 9,140 weekday rides recorded on the predecessor in Fall 2019.
