= OMSI/SE Water station =

Light rail station

OMSI/SE Water
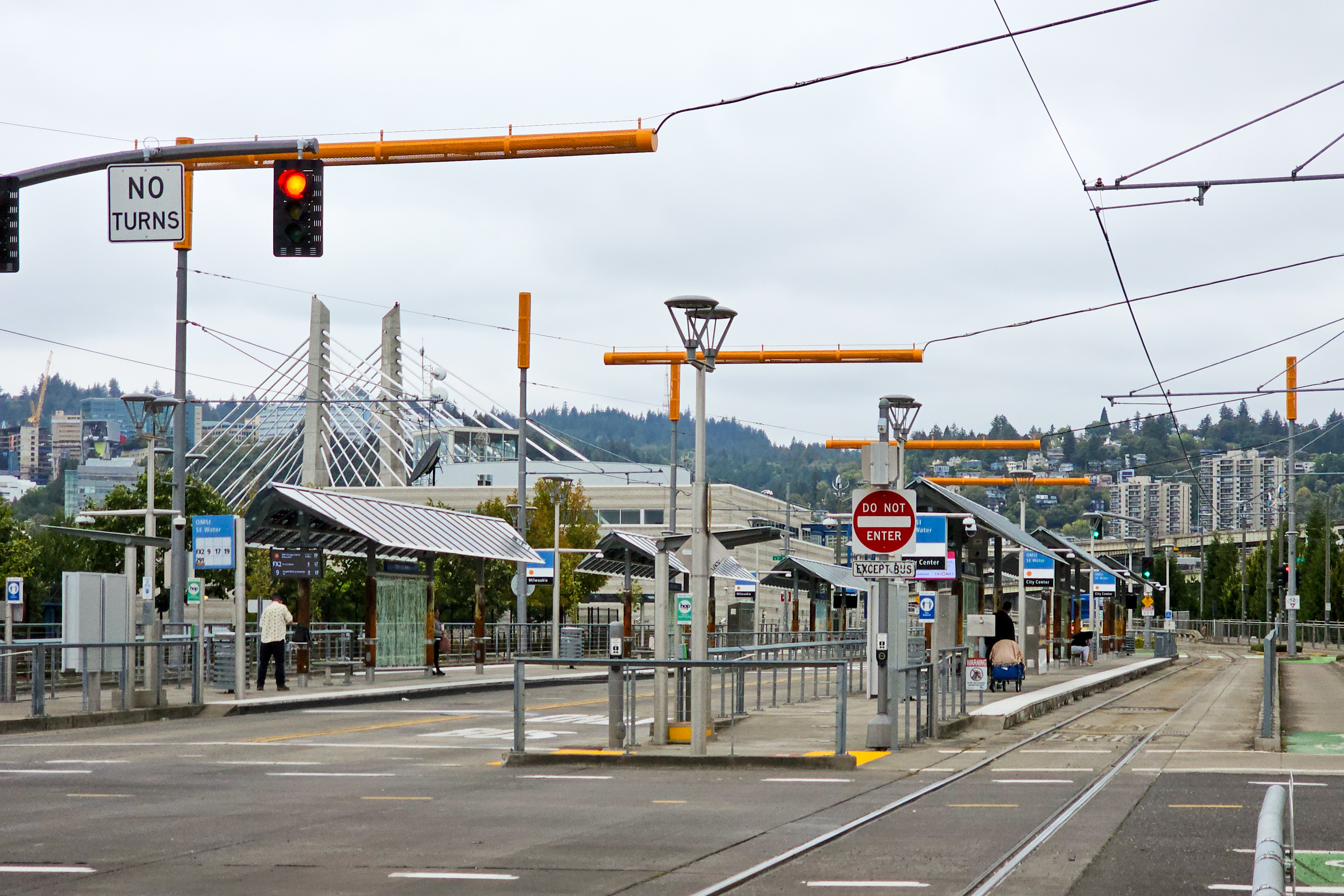
- The station platform in 2024, facing west

General information
- Location: 2210 SE 2nd Place; Portland, Oregon; U.S.
- Coordinates: 45°30′24″N 122°39′48″W
- Owner: TriMet
- Line: South Corridor
- Platforms: 1 island platform
- Tracks: 2
- Connections: Portland Streetcar: A B TriMet: FX2, 4, 9, 17

Construction
- Cycle facilities: 32 bike rack spaces
- Accessible: Yes

History
- Opened: September 12, 2015

Services
Preceding station	TriMet	Following station
Clinton St/SE 12th Ave toward SE Park Ave	Orange Line	South Waterfront/S Moody toward PSU South/SW 6th & College
Services at nearby streetcar stop
Preceding station	Portland Streetcar	Following station
South Moody & Meade
South Moody & Meade; One-way operation	A Loop	SE MLK & Mill; Next clockwise
South Moody & Meade; Next counter-clockwise	B Loop	SE Grand & Mill; One-way operation
Location

OMSI/Southeast Water station is a light rail station on the MAX Orange Line, located at 2210 Southeast 2nd Place on the east foot of the Tilikum Crossing bridge in Portland, Oregon. Like South Waterfront/SW Moody Station on the west side of the Willamette River, it consists of two island platforms. MAX trains stop on the outside of the platforms, while TriMet buses stop on the inner lanes. Just northwest of the platforms is a Portland Streetcar stop served by the A and B Loop lines. The station is named after the nearby Oregon Museum of Science and Industry.

The station is located adjacent to the Oregon Rail Heritage Center.

== Bus service ==
As of August 23, 2026, this station is served by the following bus lines:

- FX2–Division
- 4–Fessenden/Woodstock
- 9–Powell Blvd
- 17–Holgate/NE 33rd

Discontinued 8/23/26

- 19–Woodstock/Glisan (Glisan segment reassigned to 58-Canyon Rd)

== Gallery ==
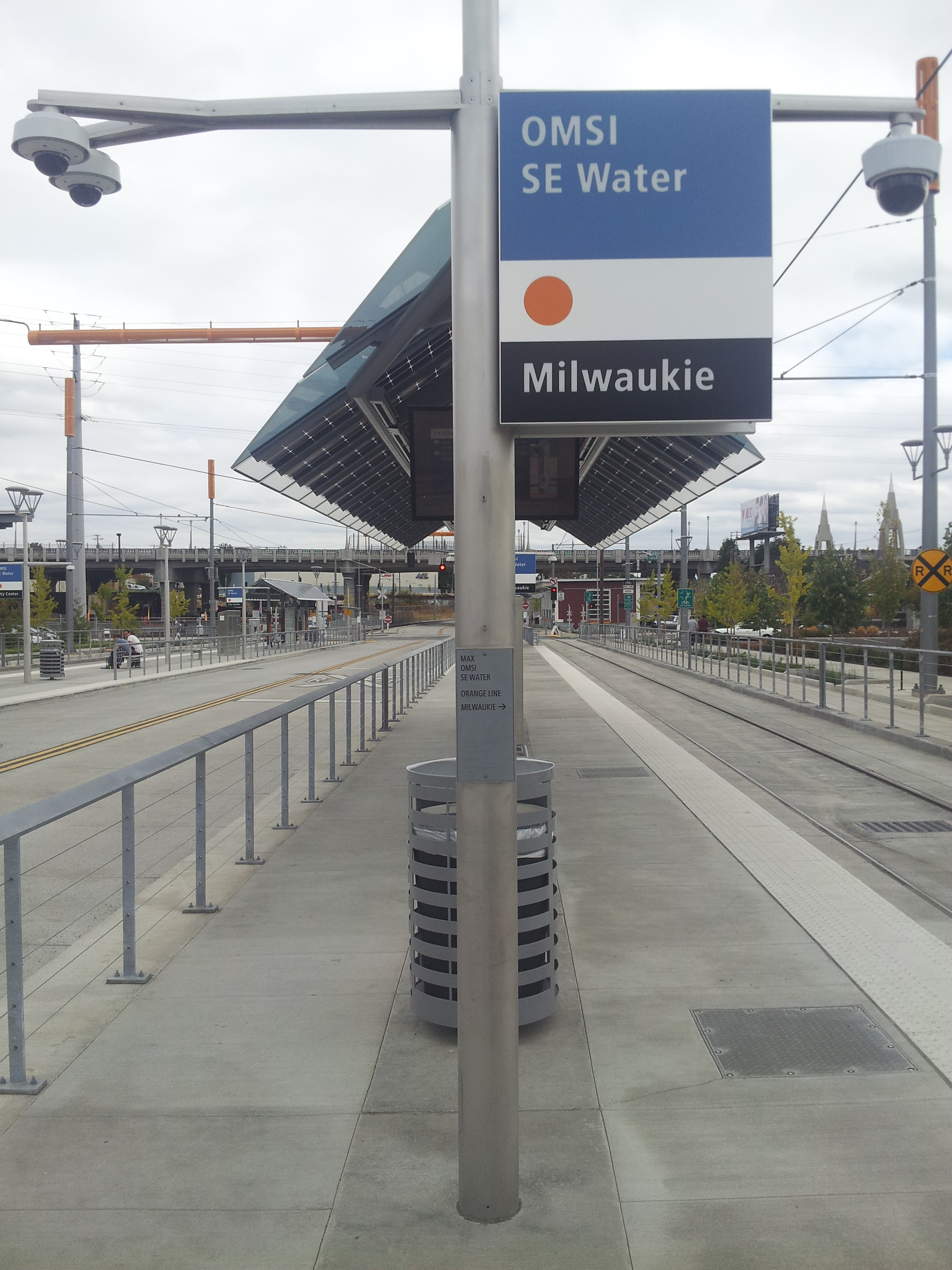
The station in September 2015

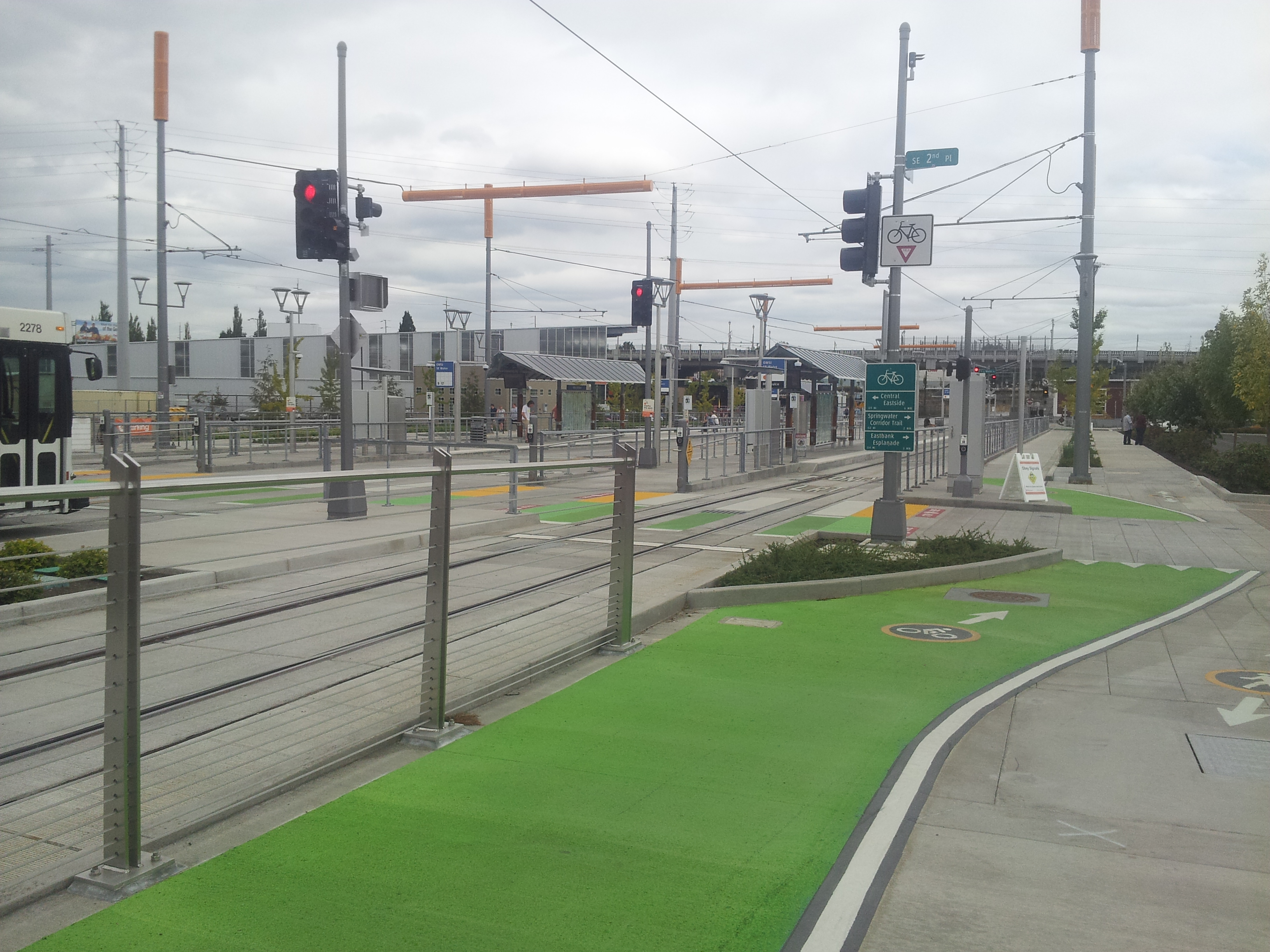
Bike paths passing through the station as seen in September 2015
