= South Waterfront/S Moody station =

Light rail and bus station in Portland, Oregon, U.S.

South Waterfront/S Moody
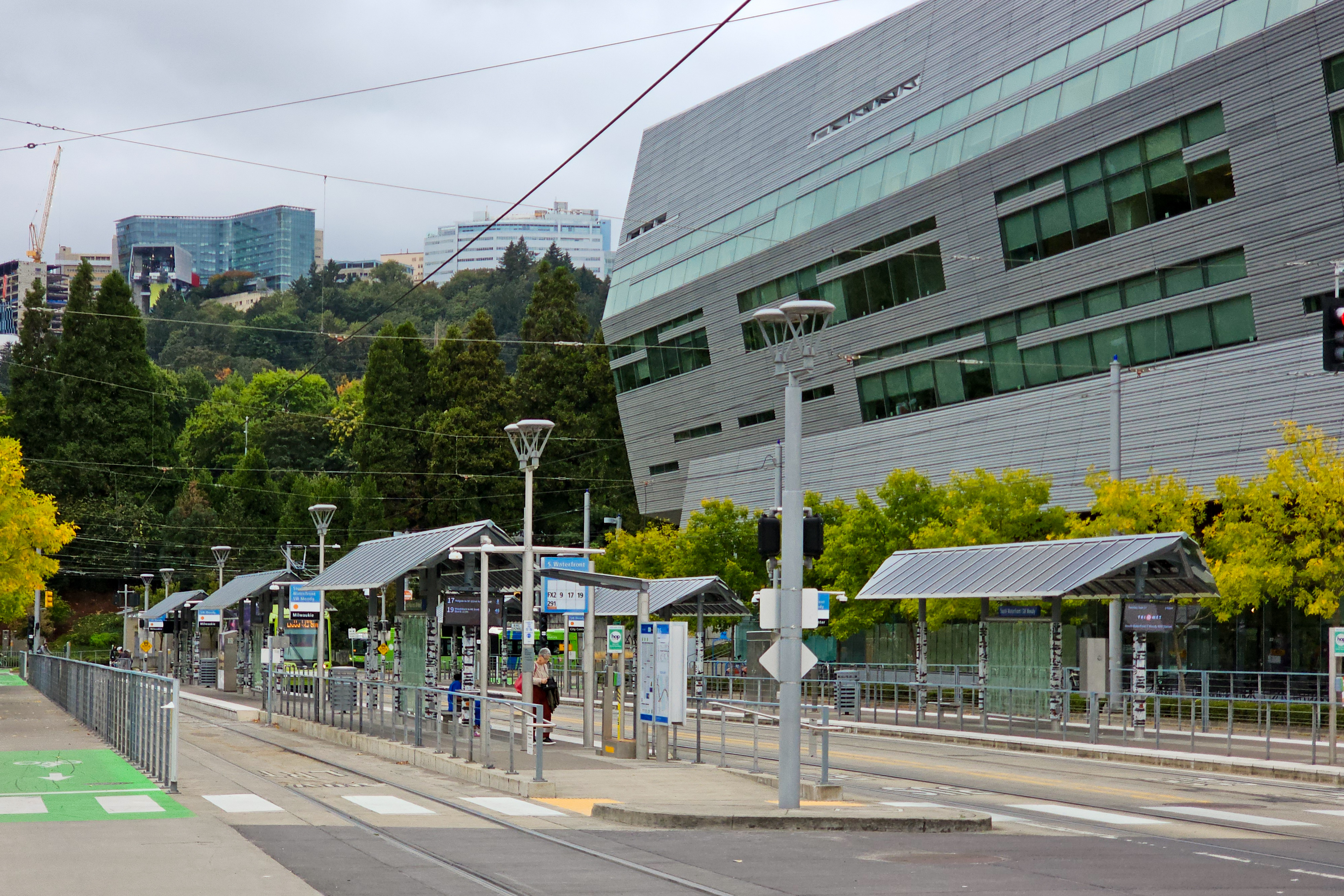
- The station in 2024, facing west

General information
- Location: 698 SW Porter Street; Portland, Oregon
- Coordinates: 45°30′09″N 122°40′19″W
- Owner: TriMet
- Platforms: 2 island platforms
- Tracks: 4
- Bus routes: FX2, 4, 9, 17; 291 - Orange Night Bus
- Connections: Portland Streetcar (at South Moody & Meade); A B NS

Construction
- Cycle facilities: 28 bike rack spaces
- Accessible: yes

History
- Opened: September 12, 2015

Services
Preceding station	TriMet	Following station
OMSI/SE Water toward SE Park Ave	Orange Line	Lincoln St/SW 3rd Ave toward PSU South/SW 6th & College
Services at nearby streetcar stop
Preceding station	Portland Streetcar	Following station
South Moody & Meade
South River Parkway & Moody towards Northwest 23rd & Marshall	NS Line	South Moody & Gibbs towards South Lowell & Bond
South River Parkway & Moody towards Northwest 23rd & Marshall	NS Line	OHSU Plaza; One-way operation
S River Parkway & Moody; One-way operation	A Loop	OMSI; Next clockwise
S River Parkway & Moody; Next counter-clockwise	B Loop	OMSI; One-way operation
Location

South Waterfront/South Moody, formerly South Waterfront/Southwest Moody, is a combined light rail and bus station located at 698 Southwest Porter Street in the South Waterfront neighborhood of Portland, Oregon, at the west end of the Tilikum Crossing bridge. It is serviced by the MAX Orange Line and TriMet buses. Portland Streetcar travels through it but does not service it.

== Station layout ==
The station sits at the west end of the Tilikum Crossing bridge. It consists of four tracks and two island platforms. The outer lanes are used by MAX trains and the inner lanes are used by the Portland Streetcar's Loop Service and buses. SW Moody Avenue, including the Portland Streetcar NS Line, cross the transit way just west of the station; there, the Loop Service merges with the NS Line and both share stops just to the north. East of the station, the Streetcar tracks merge with the MAX tracks to cross the Tilikum Crossing.

== Bus service ==
As of August 23, 2026, TriMet bus lines FX2–Division, 4–Fessenden/Woodstock, 9–Powell Blvd, and 17–Holgate/NE 33rd serve the station, using stops located on the same platforms as used by MAX but a different section of each platform. A fifth bus line serving the station is 291–Orange Night Bus, which substitutes for MAX service late at night and has only one or two trips per day. In addition, TriMet bus lines 35–Macadam/Greeley and 40–Tacoma/Swan Island pass by the station on Moody Avenue heading southbound, both serving the southbound streetcar stop.
