= Central Eastside =

- Subdistrict
- Location within Portland, Oregon
- Coordinates: 45°30′54″N 122°39′39″W
- Country: United States
- State: Oregon
- City: Portland

Area
  - Total: 1.11 sq mi (2.9 km^{2})

Central Eastside is a subdistrict of Portland, Oregon, United States, situated in Southeast Portland along the east bank of the Willamette River. It makes up a part of Portland's Central City district.

== History ==
In 1845, Oregon Trail pioneer James B. Stephens laid claim to 640 acres (260 ha) across the Willamette River from the then-newly established Portland townsite. The land had been controlled by John McLoughlin of the Hudson's Bay Company, and its location along the east bank of the river—with its marshes, creeks, and sloughs—made development challenging. Stephens established the Stark Street Ferry, whose paddle wheel was powered by a mule on a treadmill, to link the east and west sides of the river in 1848. On April 16, 1868, the Oregon Central Railroad broke ground at the settlement, which by then was being referred to as East Portland. Its railroad extended to Salem the following year and helped to start the development of an economy based on the shipment of agricultural products across the Willamette Valley. The railroad led Stephens to incorporate the City of East Portland in 1870 with its population of 8,293.
