= Zion Lutheran Church (Portland, Oregon) =

Historic church in Portland, Oregon, U.S.

- U.S. National Register of Historic Places
- Portland Historic Landmark
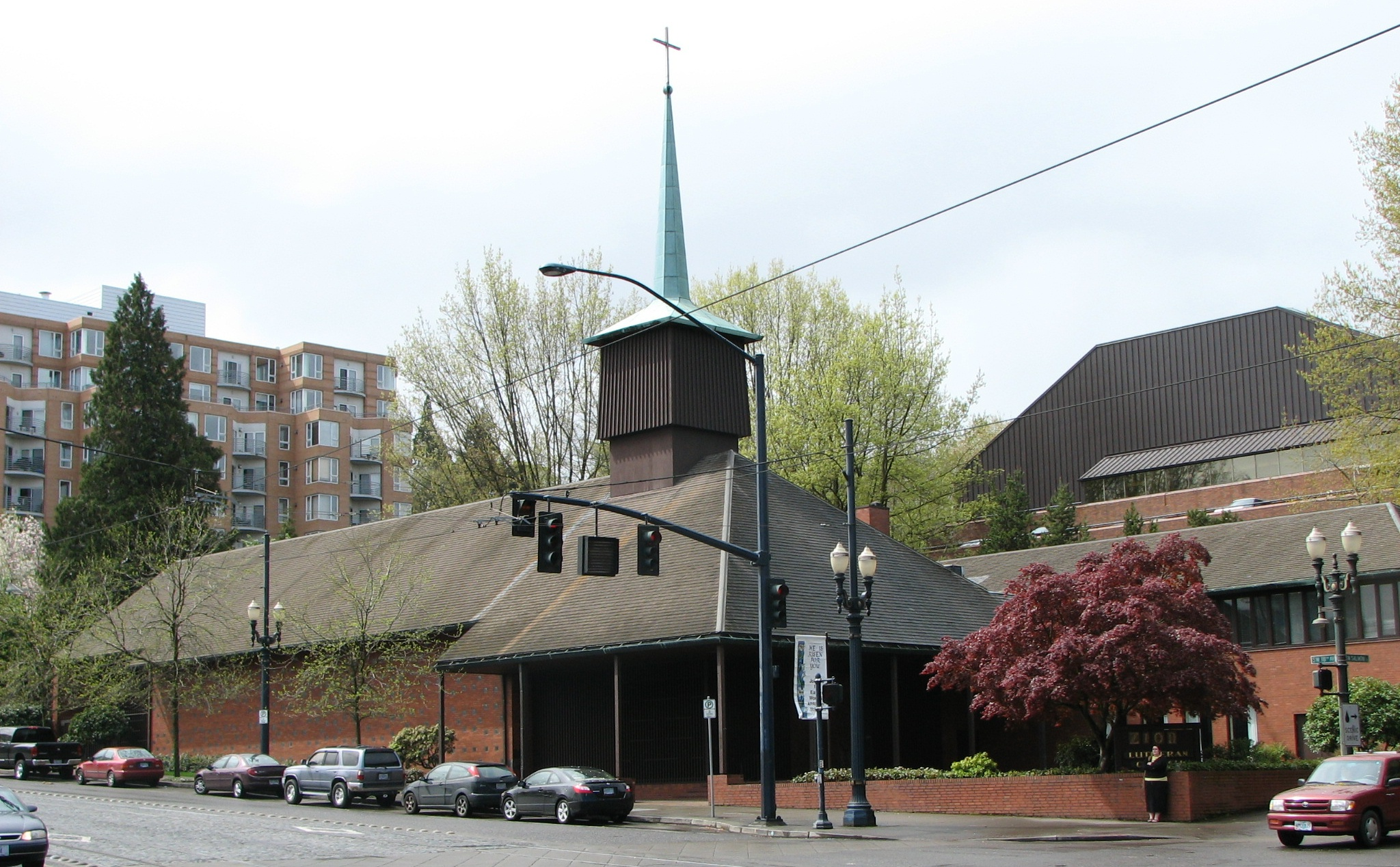
- The church building's exterior in 2007

- Location within Portland, Oregon Location within Oregon Location within the United States
- Location: 1015 SW 18th Avenue; Portland, Oregon
- Coordinates: 45°31′11″N 122°41′31″W
- Built: 1950
- Architect: Pietro Belluschi
- Architectural style: Modern Movement, Northwest Regional
- Website: http://www.zion-portland.org
- NRHP reference No.: 96000169
- Added to NRHP: March 8, 1996

The Zion Lutheran Church is a church located in downtown Portland, Oregon, listed on the National Register of Historic Places.

Architect Pietro Belluschi employed a number of innovations in this 1950 church, an example of the application of modern architectural principles to a religious building. Using local materials, influences, and artists and craftsmen, it represents the Northwest Regional style of modern architecture, which Belluschi (along with colleague John Yeon) originated and developed. The low-relief angels in hammered copper on the sanctuary doors were designed by sculptor Frederic Littman.

== See also ==
- Culture of Portland, Oregon
- National Register of Historic Places listings in Southwest Portland, Oregon
- Religion in Portland, Oregon
