= Visitors Information Center (Portland, Oregon) =

Historic building in Portland, Oregon, U.S.

- U.S. National Register of Historic Places
- Portland Historic Landmark
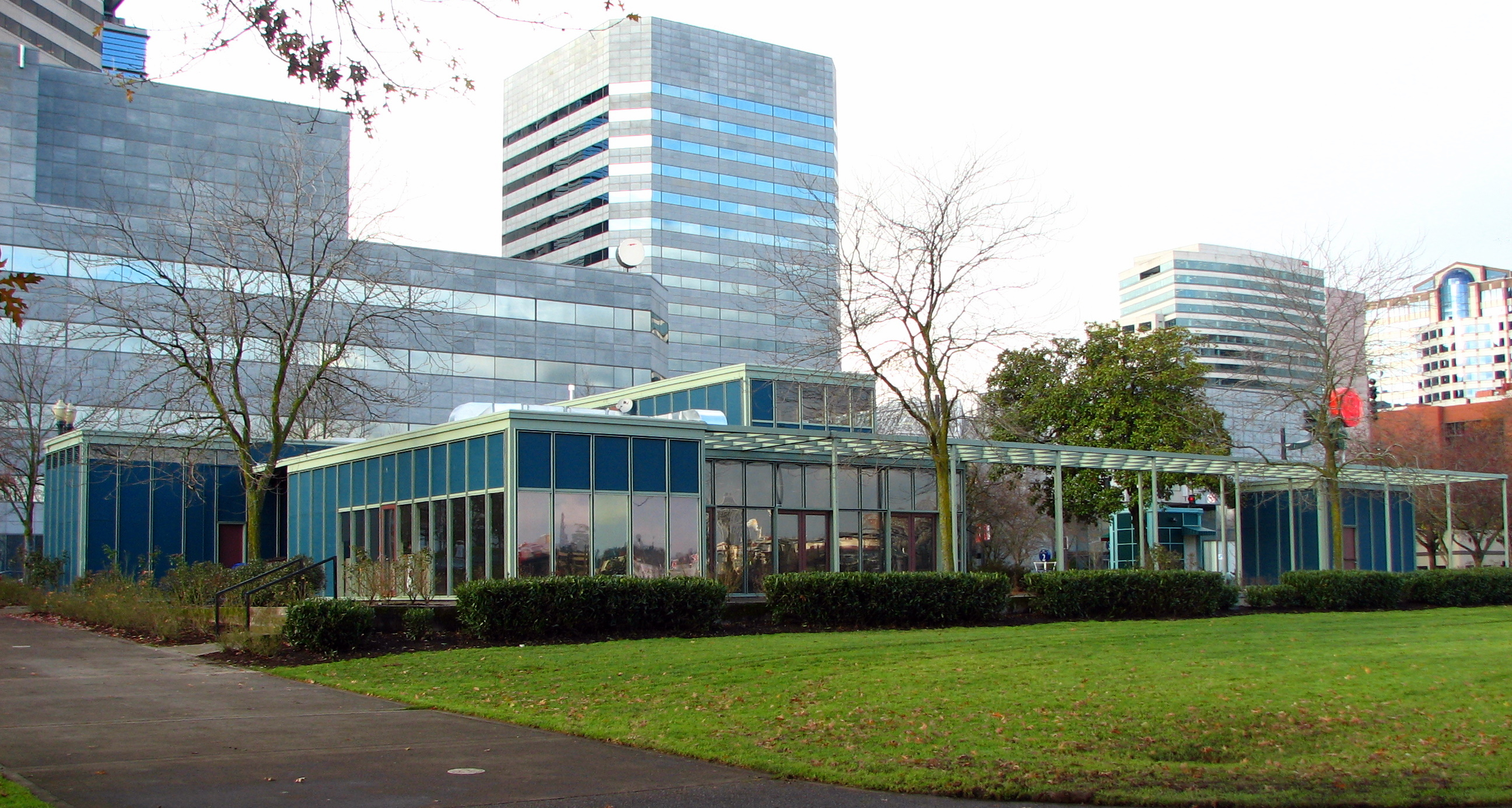
- View from the approximate alignment of the former Harbor Drive

- Location within Portland, Oregon
- Location: 1020 SW Naito Parkway; Portland, Oregon
- Coordinates: 45°30′54″N 122°40′24″W
- Built: 1948
- Architect: John Yeon (Note: John Yeon lacked a formal architectural education and consequently was unlicensed as an architect. Thus a separate professional was needed to stamp Yeon's plans. The architect of record for the Visitors Information Center was the firm of Wick, Hilgers, and Scott.)
- Architectural style: International style, with Northwest Regional style influences
- NRHP reference No.: 10000801
- Added to NRHP: September 24, 2010

The Visitors Information Center, also known as the Rose Building, is a historic building located on Naito Parkway in downtown Portland, Oregon, United States. Built in 1948, it is noted as a prominent product of its architect John Yeon. It is listed on the National Register of Historic Places.

In this, his only major non-residential commission, Yeon combined the principles of the International style with strong influences of the Northwest Regional style, which he pioneered. Northwest Regional elements include the naturally-inspired color scheme, the use of plywood walls and louvered ventilation panels, and concern for the site's unique views.

The building has served as a chamber of commerce office and information center, city offices, a restaurant, and the headquarters of the Portland Rose Festival. Originally situated adjacent to a freeway in a highly developed waterfront district, the Visitors Information Center was subsequently retained when Tom McCall Waterfront Park was developed around it. It now stands within the park.

== See also ==
- National Register of Historic Places listings in Southwest Portland, Oregon
