= Bruce West (artist) =

American artist (1939–2021)

Bruce Fraser West
- Born: 1939; Shantung Province, China
- Died: May 6, 2021 (aged 81–82)
- Spouse: Sally Taylor

Bruce West (1939 – May 6, 2021) was an American artist. West taught art at Lewis & Clark College for 34 years.

== Works ==
- Untitled (Abstract Sculpture) (1960/2006), copper, Rogue Gallery and Art Center, Medford, Oregon
- Untitled (1962), brass and copper, Portland Art Museum, Portland, Oregon
- Sculpture No. 1 (1963), Keller Auditorium, Portland, Oregon
- Untitled (c. 1970), chromium and steel, Portland Art Museum, Portland, Oregon
- Untitled (Abstract Sculpture) (1960/2006), stainless steel, Portland Art Museum, Portland, Oregon
- Untitled (1973), Standard Insurance Center, Portland, Oregon
- Untitled (1975), Oregon State Capitol, Salem, Oregon
- Sculpture Stage (1976), Tom McCall Waterfront Park, Portland, Oregon
- Untitled (1977), Portland, Oregon
- BW1 (1978), Lair Hill Park, Portland, Oregon
- Untitled (1980), Oregon Institute of Technology Library, Klamath Falls, Oregon
- Untitled (1981), Portland State University, Portland, Oregon
- Passageway - Ready for a Journey (1987), Oregon Department of Transportation, Salem, Oregon
- Beach Patterns (1989), Eastern Oregon Correctional Facility (Oregon Department of Corrections), Pendleton, Oregon
- Cascade Circus (1990), Lawrence Hall (University of Oregon), Eugene, Oregon
- Oregon Fabric (1994), Oregon Health & Science University Hospital, Portland, Oregon
- Summertime II (1994), Valley Library (Oregon State University), Corvallis, Oregon
- Summertime I (1995), Oregon Health & Science University (Marquam Hill Campus), Portland, Oregon
- Leaf Branch (1996), Valley Library (Oregon State University), Corvallis, Oregon
- Water, Water, Water (1999), Lake Oswego Fire Department building, Lake Oswego, Oregon
- Agriculture and Forestry (2000), Oregon State University, Corvallis, Oregon
- Untitled (2000), in storage; owned by City of Lake Oswego
- Standing Pear and Friends (2001) and Strawberry (2002), Auburn, Washington (at Auburn train station)
- Stainless Stele (2003), Waluga West Park, Lake Oswego, Oregon
- Ramona Falls (2003), Portland Community College Rock Creek, Portland, Oregon
- Sitting Stones, East Portland Community Center, Portland, 2009
- The Cube (2015), Salem, Oregon
