= John Yeon Speculative House =

Historic building in Portland, Oregon, U.S.

- U.S. National Register of Historic Places
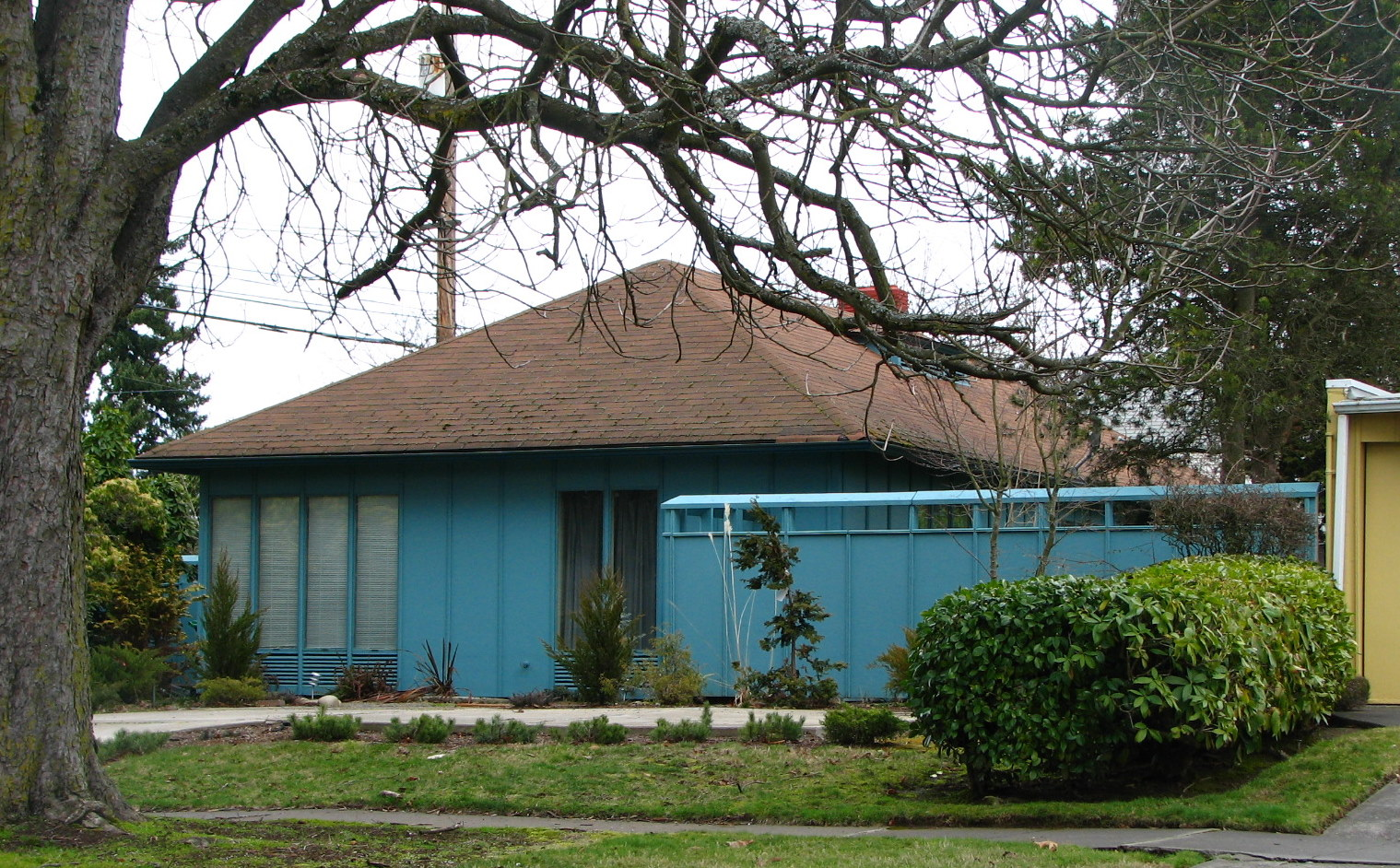
- Location: 3922 N. Lombard Street; Portland, Oregon
- Coordinates: 45°34′37″N 122°42′27″W
- Built: 1939
- Architect: John Yeon
- Architectural style: Modern
- NRHP reference No.: 07000771
- Added to NRHP: October 1, 2007

The John Yeon Speculative House is a historic house located in Portland, Oregon, United States, built in 1939. It was added onto the National Register of Historic Places on August 1, 2007. It is one of a series of speculative houses by native Oregon architect and conservationist John Yeon following the critically acclaimed Watzek House (1936). The series included nine houses built between 1938 and 1940 in Lake Oswego and Portland. The houses used a modular design concept that pioneered the use of external plywood as a building material and separate ventilation louvers, which allowed for series of fixed pane glass to be inset between vertical mullions. Yeon is frequently cited as one of the originators of what became known as the Northwest Regional style of architecture.
