= RiverPlace =

Coordinates: 45.509°N 122.674°W

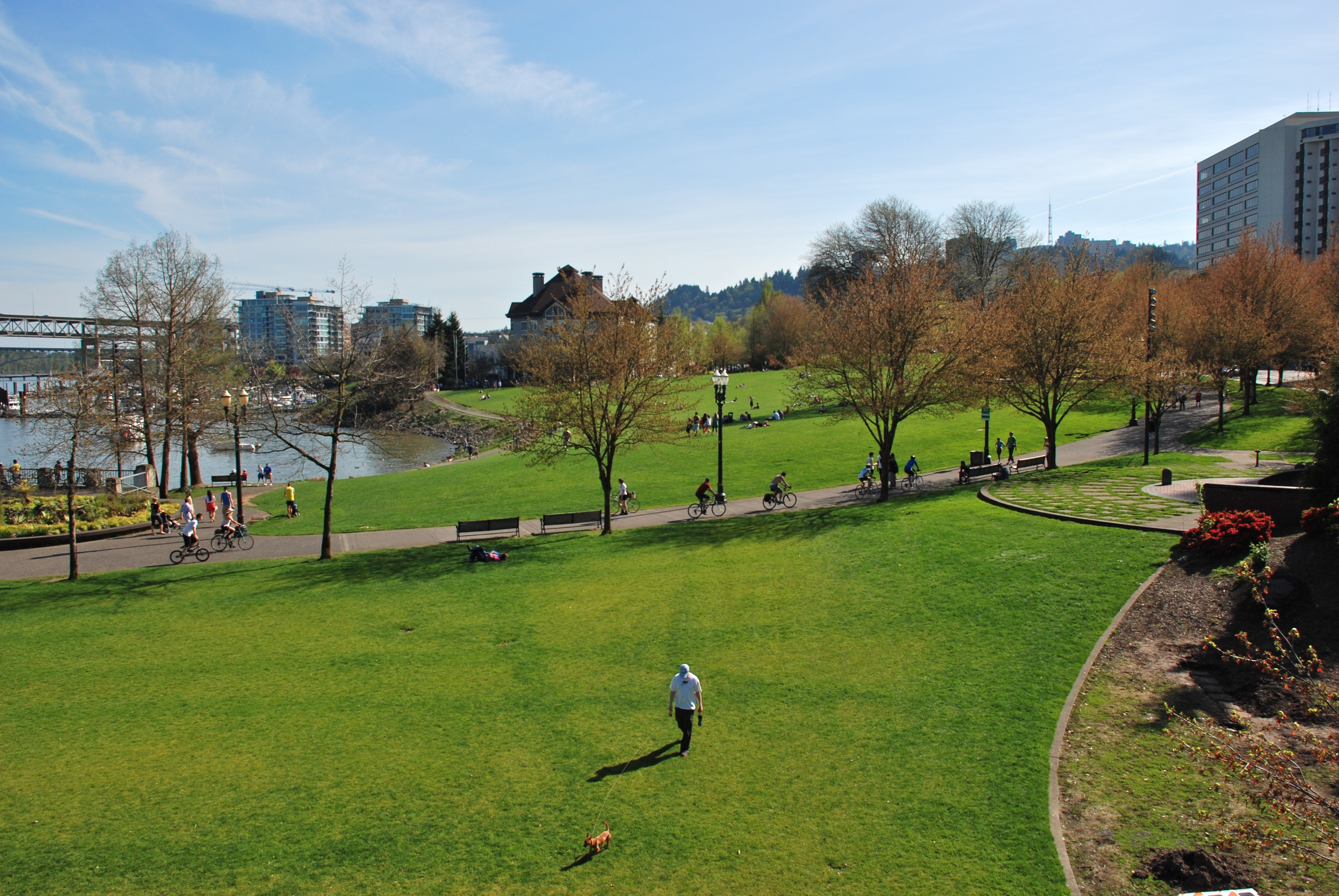
Tom McCall Waterfront Park looking toward RiverPlace

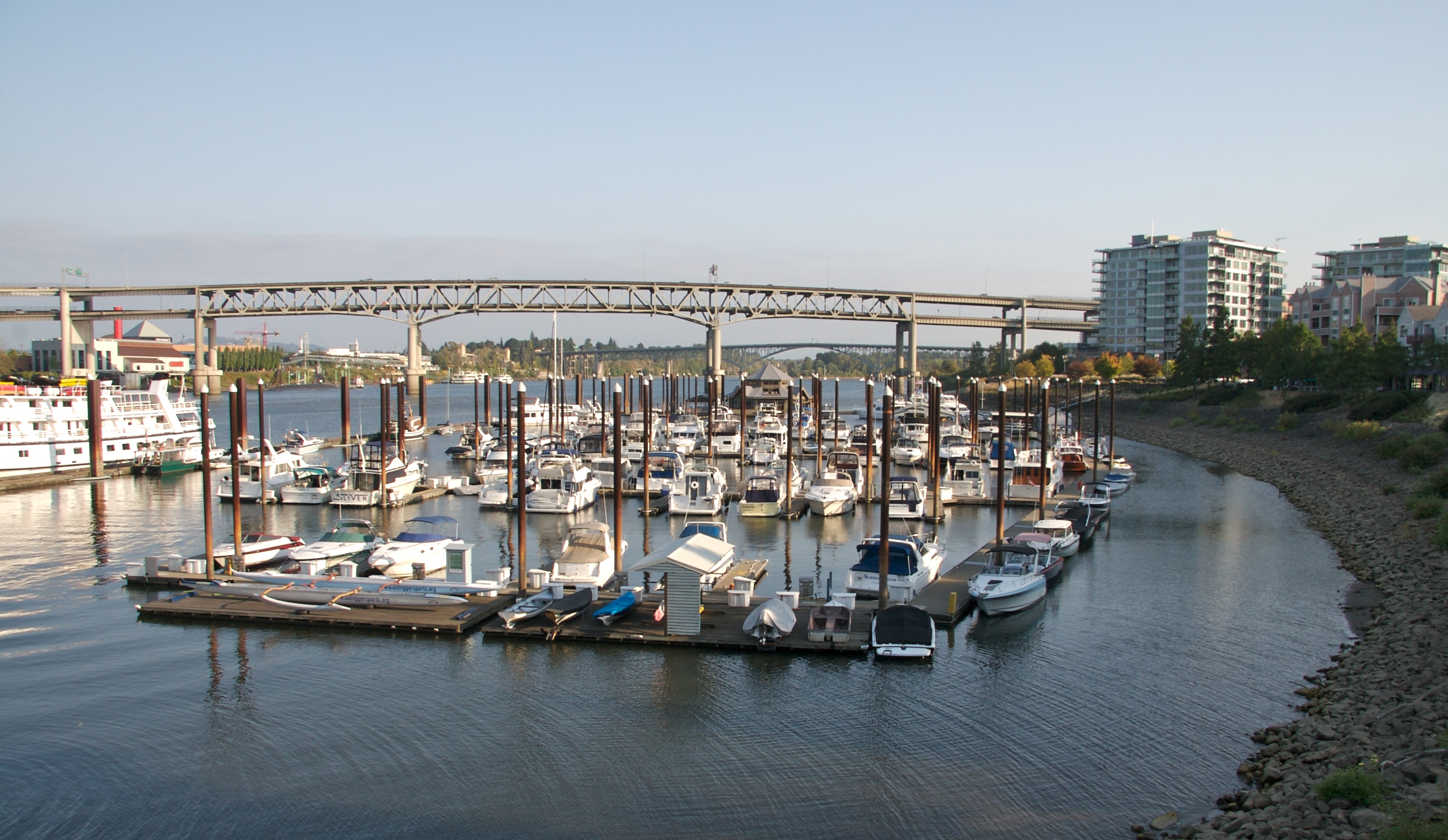
RiverPlace Marina in 2007

RiverPlace is a mixed-use district of Downtown Portland, Oregon. Although not an officially recognized neighborhood, its borders can be considered to be Naito Parkway to the west, the Willamette River to the east, and the Marquam Bridge (which carries I-5) to the south. The area was brownfield land before it was developed.

== History ==
The land which RiverPlace occupies was formerly part of Harbor Drive, an expressway running along the west bank of the Willamette River. In 1976, Harbor Drive was demolished and replaced by Waterfront Park for much of its distance, except for the 73-acre (30 ha) area where RiverPlace would be developed. The Portland Development Commission invested $6 million in improving the infrastructure and livability of the area throughout the early 1980s, including a marina by 1985. 1985 also marked the opening of the RiverPlace Hotel, a small condominium complex with amenities, a floating restaurant on the river, a marina, and boutique shops.

The RiverPlace development was completed in 1995, by which point it had 480 residential units, 26,000 square feet of retail space, and 42,000 square feet of office space (not including the headquarters of Pacific Gas Transmission, which are also in RiverPlace). The Portland Streetcar NS Line was extended through to the area from Portland State University in 2005, and the system's CL Line (subsequently reconfigured as the Loop Service) was extended to the area in 2015. The MAX Orange Line, a light rail line which opened in 2015, runs on elevated tracks through the west end of the district, but does not have a stop within it.
