= RiverPlace Hotel =

Hotel in Portland, Oregon, U.S.

- Interactive map of the RiverPlace Hotel area

General information
- Location: Portland, Oregon, United States
- Coordinates: 45.5114°N 122.6742°W

The RiverPlace Hotel (also known as the Kimpton RiverPlace Hotel) is a hotel in Portland, Oregon, United States. It is located at the south end of Tom McCall Waterfront Park, along the Willamette River.

== History ==
The hotel opened on Harbor Drive in 1985. In 2026, Amaterra Hospitality Group (the parent company of Amaterra Winery) purchased the hotel.

The restaurant Three Degrees was replaced by King Tide Fish and Shell.
