= Puget Sound Naval Academy =

Location
- Bainbridge Island, Washington
- Coordinates: 47°39′40″N 122°30′3″W

Information
- Former name: Moran School
- Type: Military, preparatory, single-gender
- Closed: 1951
- Gender: Male
- Age range: 12-18
- Campus size: 40 acres

The Puget Sound Naval Academy (formerly the Moran School or Moran Junior College, and also called Hill Naval Academy) was a private, military style preparatory school intended to prepare young men and boys for attendance at the United States Naval Academy and the United States Coast Guard Academy. It was located in Bainbridge Island, Washington.

== Moran School ==
Frank G. Moran purchased the Manitou Park Hotel and its 40-acre property in 1914 and converted it to the Moran School for Boys, a private boarding school for the sons of well-off Seattle families. Ultimately, the school would occupy three buildings: the Day Hall (including dormitory and kitchens), Wilson Hall, and the Yates Hall (including administration offices and an auditorium, completed in 1918). In 1919, Frank Moran would found the Lakeside School in Seattle, with the intention of running the Lakeside School as a "feeder" school for his Moran School.

Notable alumni from the school include Nobel Prize winning physicist Walter Houser Brattain (graduated 1920) and influential architect John Yeon.

In November 1932, after installing a laboratory in the basement of the Wilson Hall, an explosion destroyed the building. The school would file suit against the Standard Oil company alleging that the explosion was due in part to defective equipment provided by Standard Oil, and the use of poorly trained employees to test the installation. The lawsuit would be decided in favor of Standard Oil. After the explosion, and against the backdrop of the Great Depression, the school would close for the first time in 1933.

Sources refer to the school during this 1914 to 1933 period as the "Moran School", "Moran School for Boys", and the "Moran Junior College."

== Puget Sound Naval Academy ==
Joseph Hill acquired the Moran School in 1937 for the cost of the school's back taxes and renamed it to Puget Sound Naval Academy. The Day and Yates Halls were renamed to U.S.S Dewey and U.S.S Bainbridge respectively.

In addition to a normal high school curriculum, the academy included classes in seamanship, sailing and drill. Due to small enrollment, the academy did not have a sports team.

In 1950, the school was renamed to the Hill Naval Academy. It also acquired USS PCS-1425, a former Navy patrol craft. The school would close its doors forever the following year, 1951.

== Fate ==
Some portion of the school was converted to the "Messenger House" retirement home, which was scheduled to close in 2018. The school's administration building was used as a storehouse since the 1960s, and was used a set in the film Farewell to Harry. The building deteriorated, and despite local efforts to save it, was demolished in 2017.

== Additional resources ==
- The Seattle Public Library system maintains records and articles related to the Moran School.
- Media related to the Puget Sound Naval Academy is available on the Museum of History and Industry's digital archive.
- Academy (ISBN 978-0-7392-0033-9) by Charles Lindenberg. A first-hand memoir written by one of the academy's students.
- The Bainbridge Island Historical Museum maintains files on both the Moran School and the Puget Sound Naval Academy.
