= Untitled (West) =

Sculpture by Bruce West in Portland, Oregon, U.S.

- The sculpture in 2016
- Artist: Bruce West
- Year: 1977
- Type: Sculpture
- Medium: Stainless steel
- Dimensions: 2.1 m (7 ft)
- Location: Portland, Oregon, United States; 45.52053°N 122.67780°W

Untitled is an outdoor 1977 stainless steel sculpture by American artist Bruce West, installed in Portland, Oregon, in the United States.

== Description ==
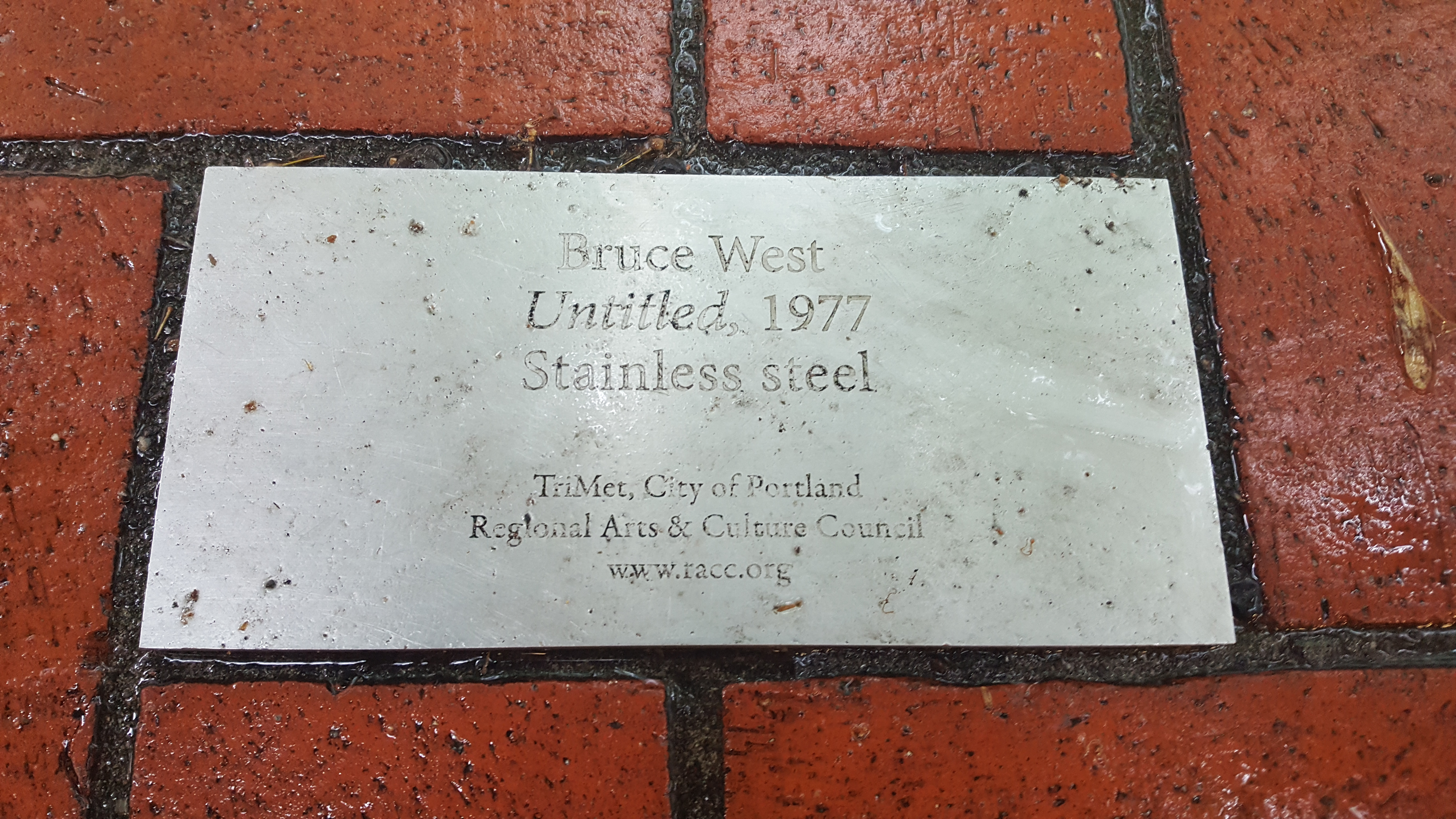
Plaque for the sculpture

Bruce West's Untitled is installed along Southwest 6th Avenue between Washington and Stark streets in Portland's Transit Mall. It was one of eleven works chosen in 1977 to make the corridor "more people oriented and attractive" as part of the Portland Transit Mall Art Project. The stainless steel sculptures is 7 feet (2.1 m) tall. It was funded by TriMet and the United States Department of Transportation, and is administered by the Regional Arts & Culture Council.

== See also ==
- 1977 in art
- Sculpture Stage (1976), another Portland sculpture by Bruce West
