= USS PCS-1425 =

Minesweeper of the United States Navy

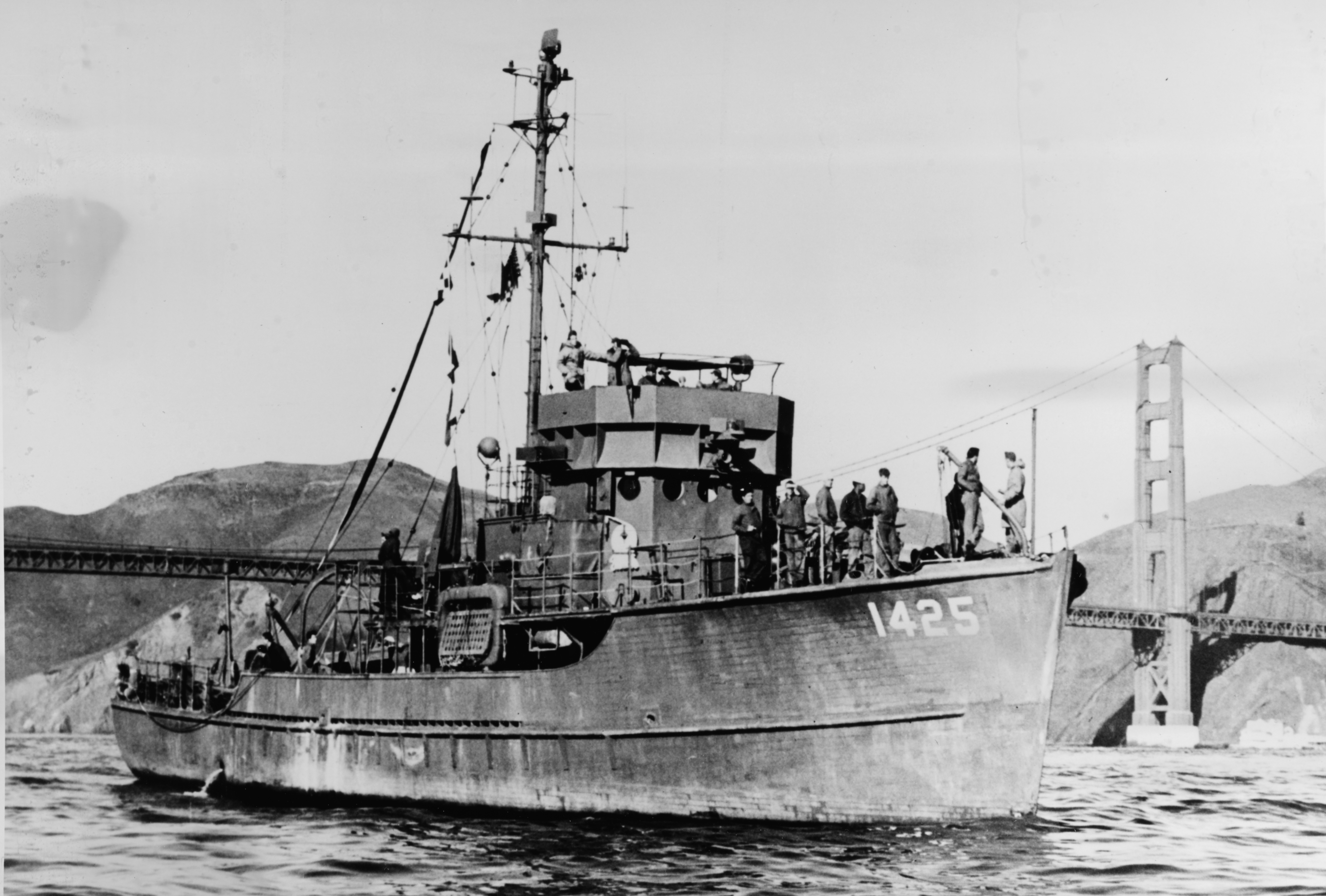
- USS PCS-1425 in San Francisco Bay, California, c. 1945-46

History

United States Navy
- Name: USS PC-1425
- Builder: Hiltebrant Dry Dock Co., Kingston, New York
- Laid down: 22 January 1943
- Renamed: USS PCS-1425, April 1943
- Reclassified: Patrol craft sweeper (PCS), April 1943
- Launched: 20 July 1943
- Commissioned: 4 February 1944
- Fate: Transferred to War Shipping Administration January 1947

History

Puget Sound Naval Academy Training Ship
- Owner: Puget Sound Naval Academy
- Acquired: 1950

General characteristics
- Class & type: PCS-1376-class minesweeper
- Displacement: 252 tons
- Length: 136 ft (41 m)
- Beam: 24 ft 6 in (7.47 m)
- Draft: 8 ft 7 in (2.62 m)
- Propulsion: 2 × 880 bhp General Motors 8-268A diesel engines, Knobstedt single reduction gear; 2 shafts
- Speed: 14.1 knots (26.1 km/h)
- Complement: 57
- Armament: 1 × 3"/50 caliber gun mount; 1 × 20 mm gun mount; 4 × depth charge projectors; 1 × Hedgehog; 2 × depth charge tracks

USS PCS-1425 was a United States Navy minesweeper and patrol ship in service during World War II. Her keel was laid in 1943 as PC-1425, before being reclassified three months later as a "patrol craft sweeper" (PCS). After the war, the ship served as a test platform for the development of naval radios, being the first ship to demonstrate the use of an automatically aligning UHF directional antenna.

In 1947, she was leased to the Puget Sound Naval Academy for use as a training ship.
