= Bite of Oregon =

Food festival in Portland, Oregon, U.S.

- Frequency: Annually
- Locations: Portland, Oregon
- Country: United States
- Attendance: 50,000

Bite of Oregon is an annual food festival held in Portland, Oregon. Considered to be the largest in the U.S. state of Oregon, the three-day event attracts more than 50,000 attendees every year. The festival is held at Tom McCall Waterfront Park. It benefits Special Olympics Oregon.

== See also ==
- Culture of Portland, Oregon
