= East Portland Community Center =

Community center in Portland, Oregon, U.S.

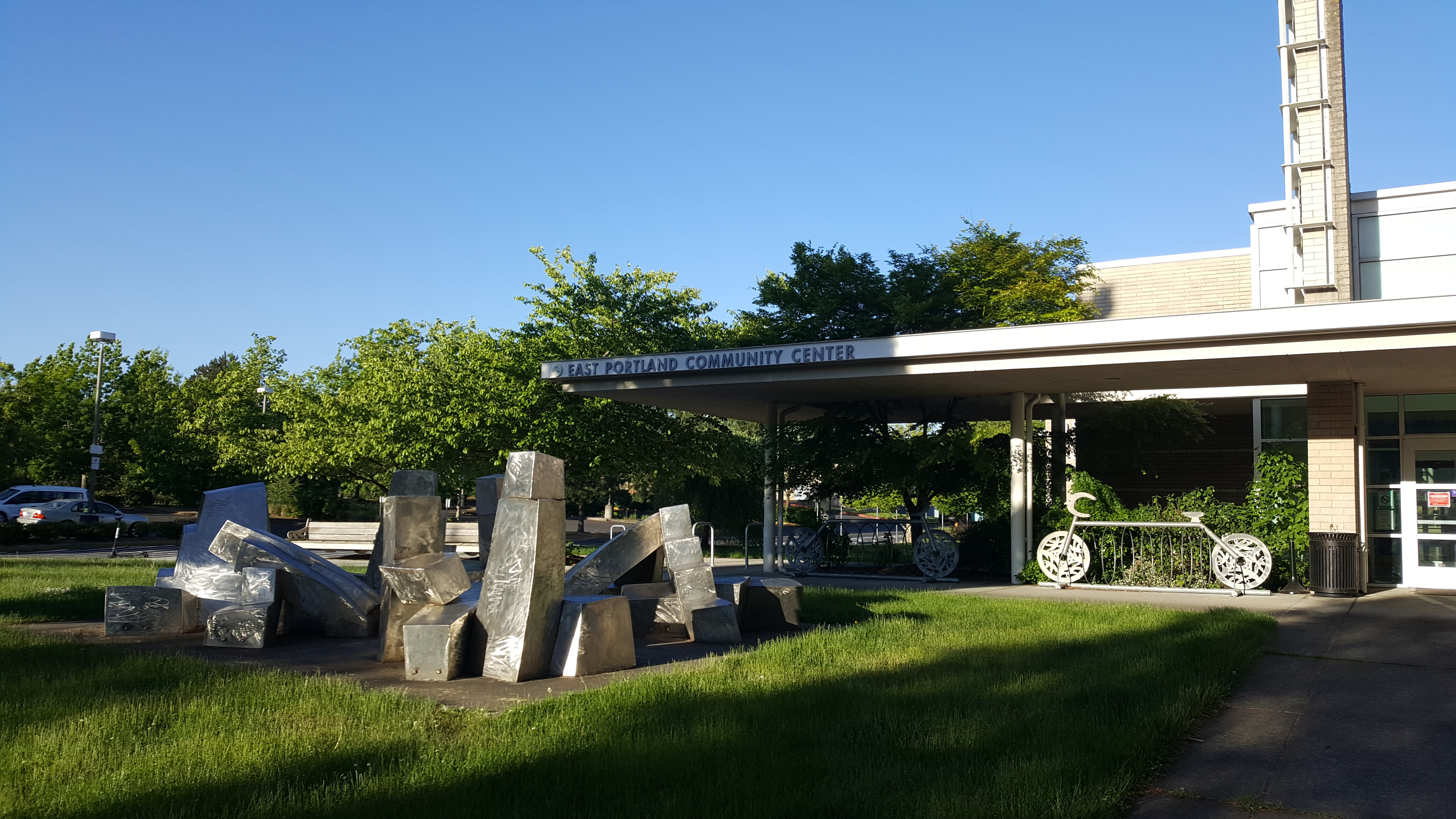
- The community center's exterior, 2021
- Interactive map of the East Portland Community Center area

General information
- Type: Community center
- Location: 740 Southeast 106th Avenue, Portland, Oregon, United States
- Coordinates: 45.5161°N 122.5535°W

The East Portland Community Center is a community center in Mill Park, Portland, Oregon, United States.

== Description and history ==
Funded by a bond measure, the center was established in 1998. In 2009, an aquatic center was added and Bruce West's sculpture Sitting Stones was installed outside the building. The center features two indoor pools. The E205 Initiative Projects, completed in 2013, resulted in the construction of play structures for children at the center.

The center has been used as a temporary homeless shelter.

Charles Jordan has been credited for helping to develop the center.
