= Sculpture Stage =

Sculpture in Portland, Oregon

- The sculpture in 2015
- Artist: Bruce West
- Year: 1976
- Type: Sculpture
- Medium: Stainless steel
- Condition: "Well maintained" (1993)
- Location: Portland, Oregon, United States; 45°31′21″N 122°40′10″W
- Owner: City of Portland and Multnomah County Public Art Collection courtesy of the Regional Arts & Culture Council

Sculpture Stage is an outdoor 1976 stainless steel sculpture by Bruce West, located in Tom McCall Waterfront Park in downtown Portland, Oregon. The work was funded by the Comprehensive Employment and Training Act and is part of the City of Portland and Multnomah County Public Art Collection courtesy of the Regional Arts & Culture Council.

== Description and history ==
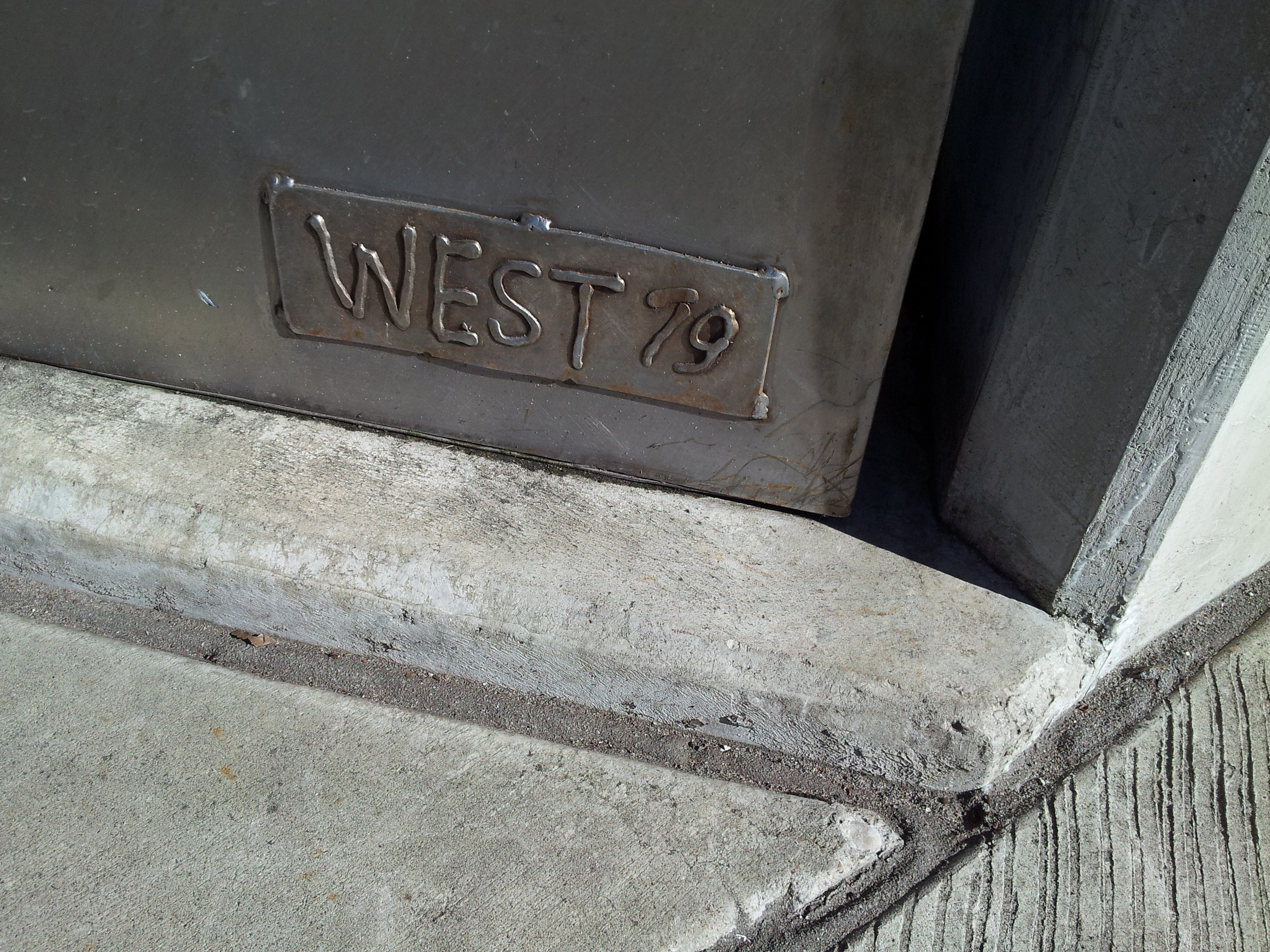
Corner of the sculpture

Sculpture Stage is a 1976 welded stainless steel sculpture by Bruce West, with assistance from poet Tom Cullerton, artist Jeff Tolbert and Hugh Mitchell, the landscape architect of Tom McCall Waterfront Park's Riverfront Plaza. It is located at the intersection of Southwest Ankeny and Southwest Naito Parkway, just south of the Burnside Bridge. The piece was commissioned for $28,000 by the Portland Development Commission, with funds from the Comprehensive Employment and Training Act. It is approximately 11 feet, 7 inches tall x 63 feet wide and was designed to cover the Ankeny pumping station and serve a backdrop for a stage. The Smithsonian Institution categorizes the sculpture as abstract and describes it as a "curved relief in six sections with horizontal lines suggesting a landscape, and may be used as a backdrop for a stage".

The work was surveyed and considered "well maintained" by Smithsonian's "Save Outdoor Sculpture!" program in April 1993. At that time, it was administered by the City of Portland's Development Commission. Presently, the work is part of the City of Portland and Multnomah County Public Art Collection courtesy of the Regional Arts & Culture Council.

== See also ==
- 1976 in art
- Untitled (West) (1977), another Portland sculpture by Bruce West
