= Northwest Regional style =

Mid-20th century American architectural style

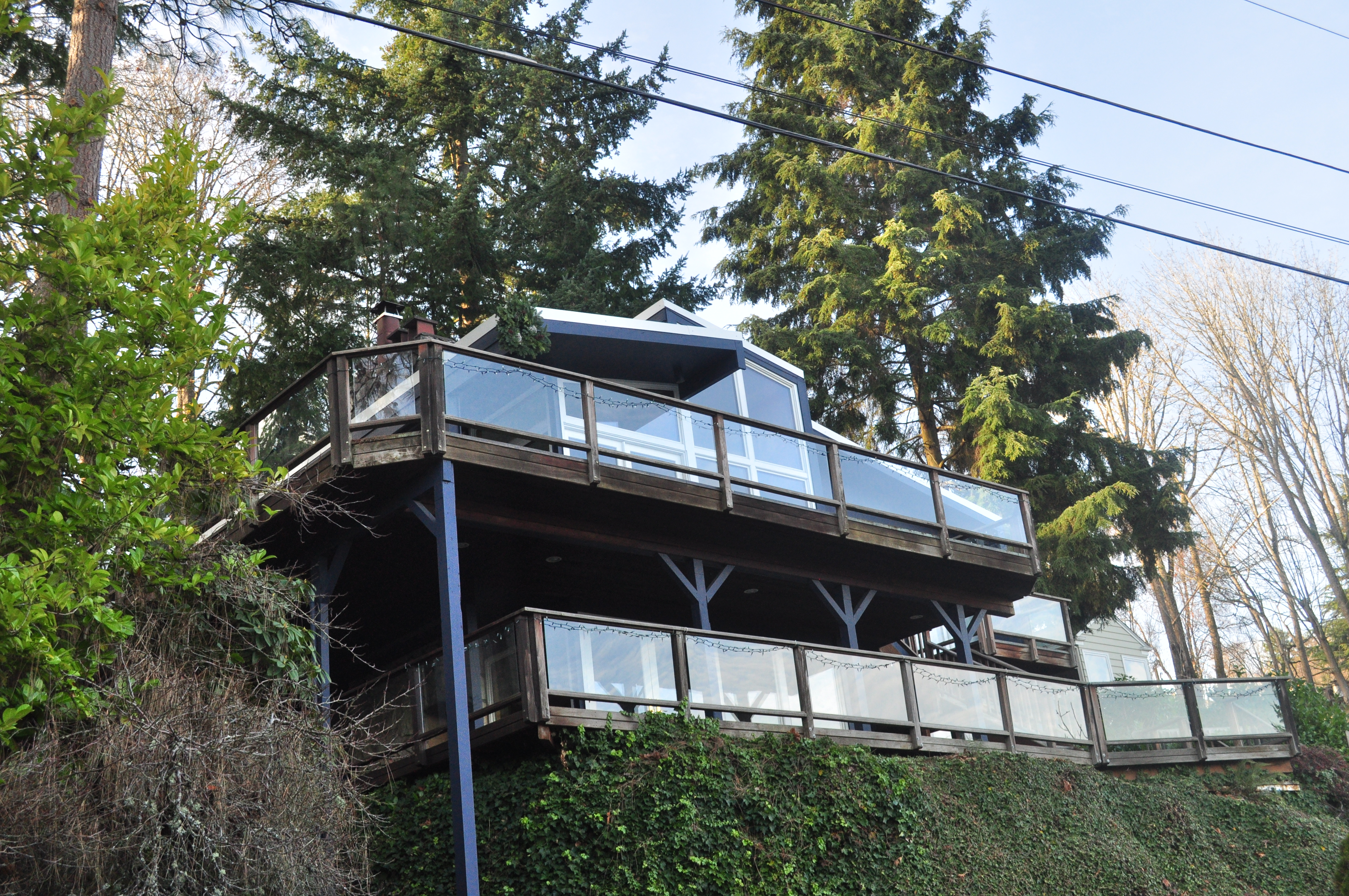
A Northwest Regional style house in the Matthews Beach neighborhood of Seattle.

Northwest Regional style architecture is an architectural style popular in the Pacific Northwest between 1935 and 1960. It is a regional variant of the International Style. It is defined by the extensive use of unpainted wood in both interiors and exteriors. Other features of the style include integration of the building with its setting through asymmetrical floor plans, exterior open rooms, extensive use of glass extending to the floor, a low-pitched or flat roof of shingles with overhanging eaves, and a minimum of decoration. It is sometimes known as Northwest style or Northwest modernism.

== History ==
The International Style of the West Coast traveled north and influenced architects. The terrain of the Northwest impacted the Modern style with architects making the conscious decision to preserve site elements like: Mountains, views of water, and paths of light. The defining characteristic of the wooden exterior and interiors came from the terrain of the Northwest too, with the abundance of tree species like redwood, douglas fir, and western red cedar. This allowed for a warmer modern architectural style, separating it from the stucco and concrete structures of California. The style was developed by architects including Paul Thiry in Seattle and John Yeon in Oregon, and was used most often in residential buildings. Other proponents of the style included Paul Hayden Kirk, Benjamin F. McAdoo, Pietro Belluschi, John Storrs, Van Evera Bailey, Herman Brookman, and Saul Zaik.

== Notable examples ==
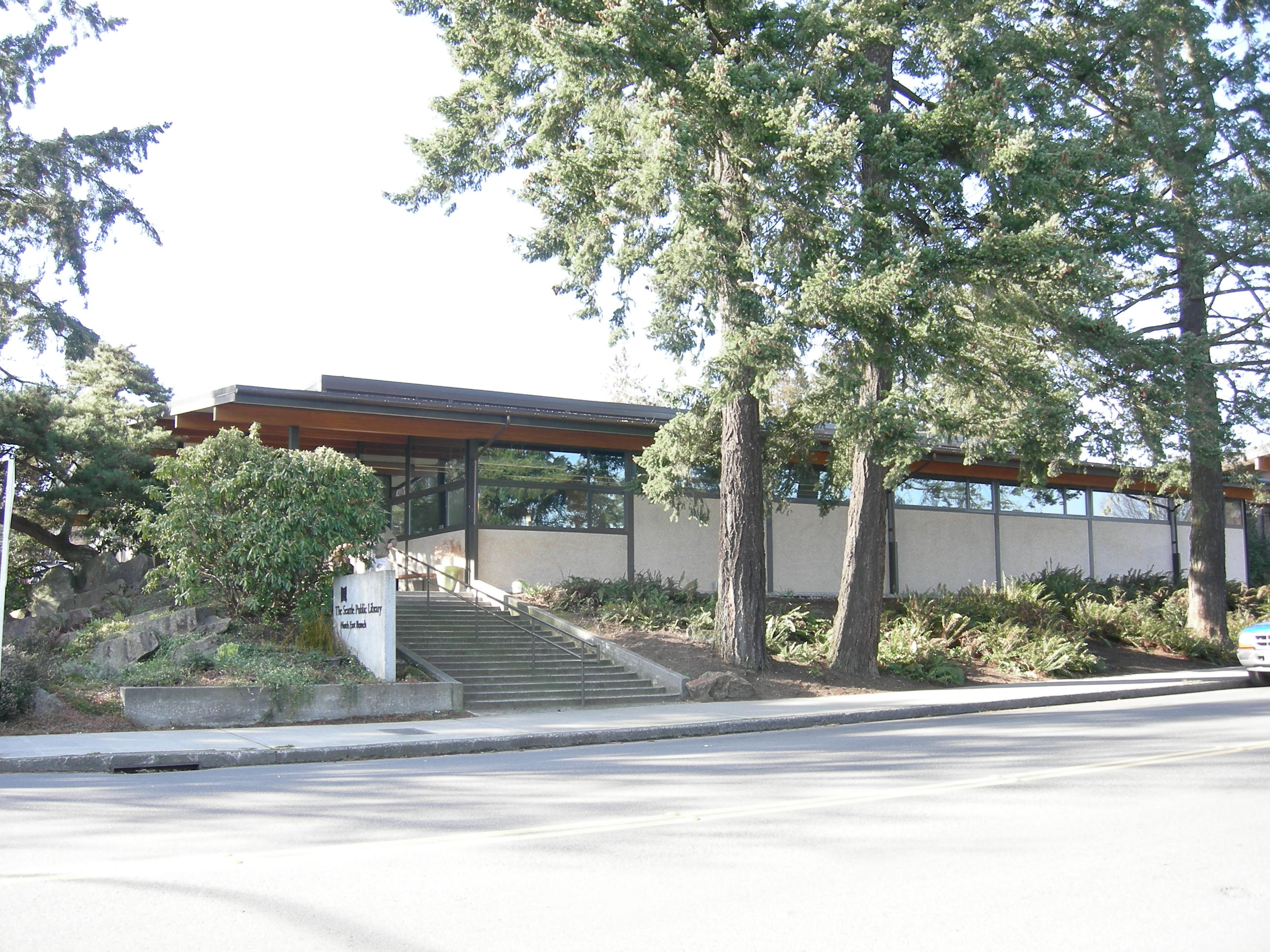
Paul Thiry's Northeast Branch Library in Seattle

Some examples of Northwest Regional style include the Harry F. Wentz Studio on the Oregon coast, the Chapel at George Fox University in Newburg, Oregon, and the Museum of Contemporary Craft, John Yeon Speculative House, Aubrey R. Watzek House, Zion Lutheran Church, and Visitors Information Center in Portland. Seattle examples include the Northeast Branch Library by Thiry, University of Washington Faculty Club, and University Unitarian Church.

== See also ==
- Arthur Erickson
- Mid-century modern
- Pacific lodge
- William Wurster
