= Ankeny pumping station =

Pumping station in Portland, Oregon, U.S.

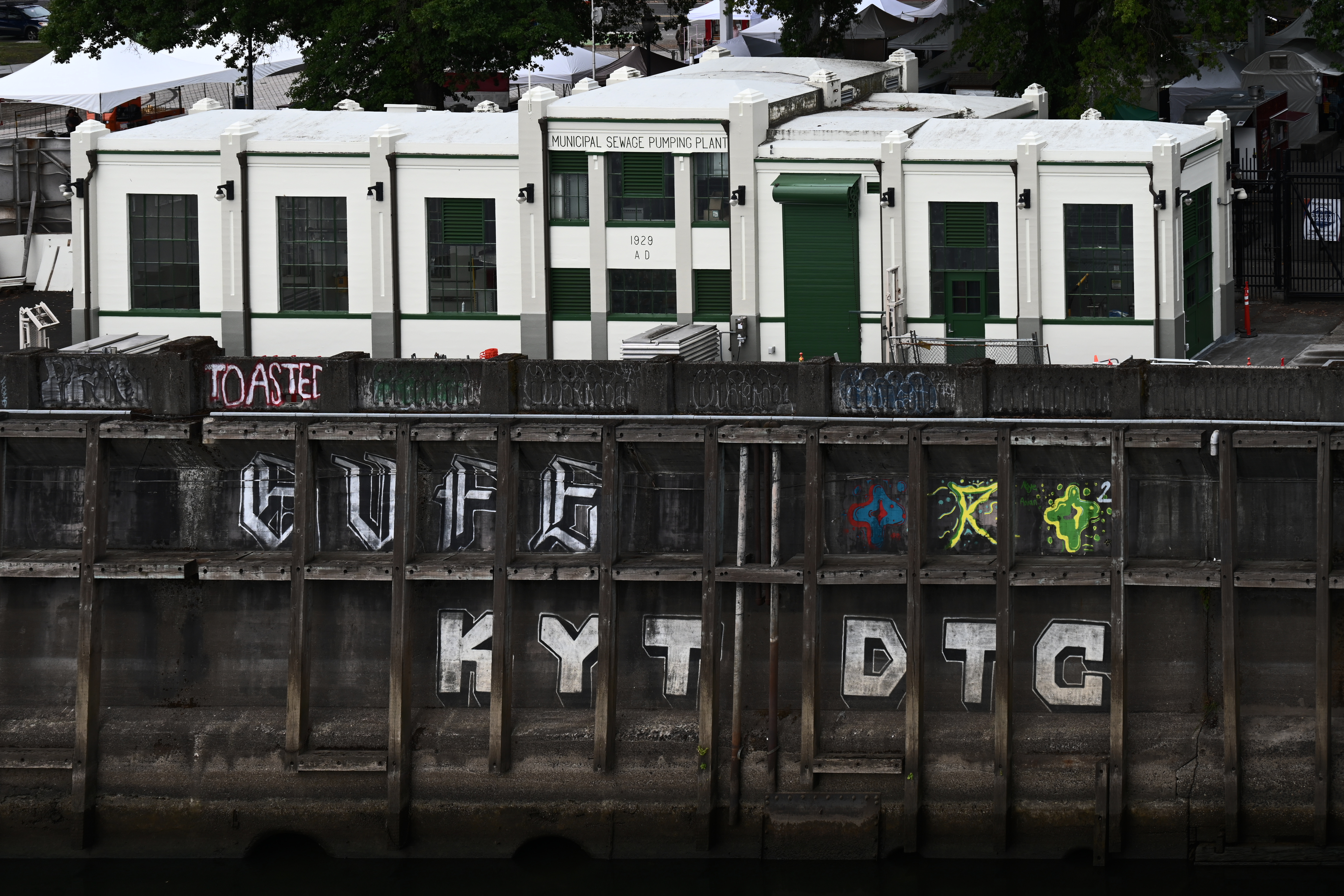
- The station's exterior in 2024
- Interactive map of the Ankeny pumping station area

General information
- Location: Tom McCall Waterfront Park, Portland, Oregon, United States
- Coordinates: 45.52267727205765°N 122.66935106118414°W

The Ankeny pumping station, or Ankeny sewage pumping station, is a 10,000-gallon pumping station in Portland, Oregon's Tom McCall Waterfront Park.

== History ==
11,000-volt equipment was installed in 1929.

The Sullivan Pumping Station, when constructed beginning in 1951 as part of an overhaul of the city's sewage system, became the largest component of the city's sewage system. It was across the Willamette River from the Ankeny station, in the block bounded by NE Everett, Flanders, 2nd, and 3rd streets. (These streets no longer exist; the location at the mouth of Sullivan's Gulch is now a railroad interchange.) The Ankeny station served to pump sewage under the river to the Sullivan's Gulch plant, which in turn transferred it to a massive plant on Columbia Boulevard for treatment prior to being dumped into the Columbia River.

A bid for new switch gear was accepted by city council in 1957. The gear was installed in 1958.

When Tom McCall Waterfront Park was built in the 1970s, the plant was screened off from the park with a sculptural wall (Sculpture Stage, 1976) and trees. In 1977 it was reported to pump up to 80,000 gallons of sewage per minute under the river.

== See also ==
Portland's modern infrastructure to address similar sewage transfer needs:

- East Side Big Pipe
- West Side CSO Tunnel
