= Aubrey R. Watzek House =

Historic building in Portland, Oregon, U.S.

- U.S. National Register of Historic Places
- U.S. National Historic Landmark
- Portland Historic Landmark
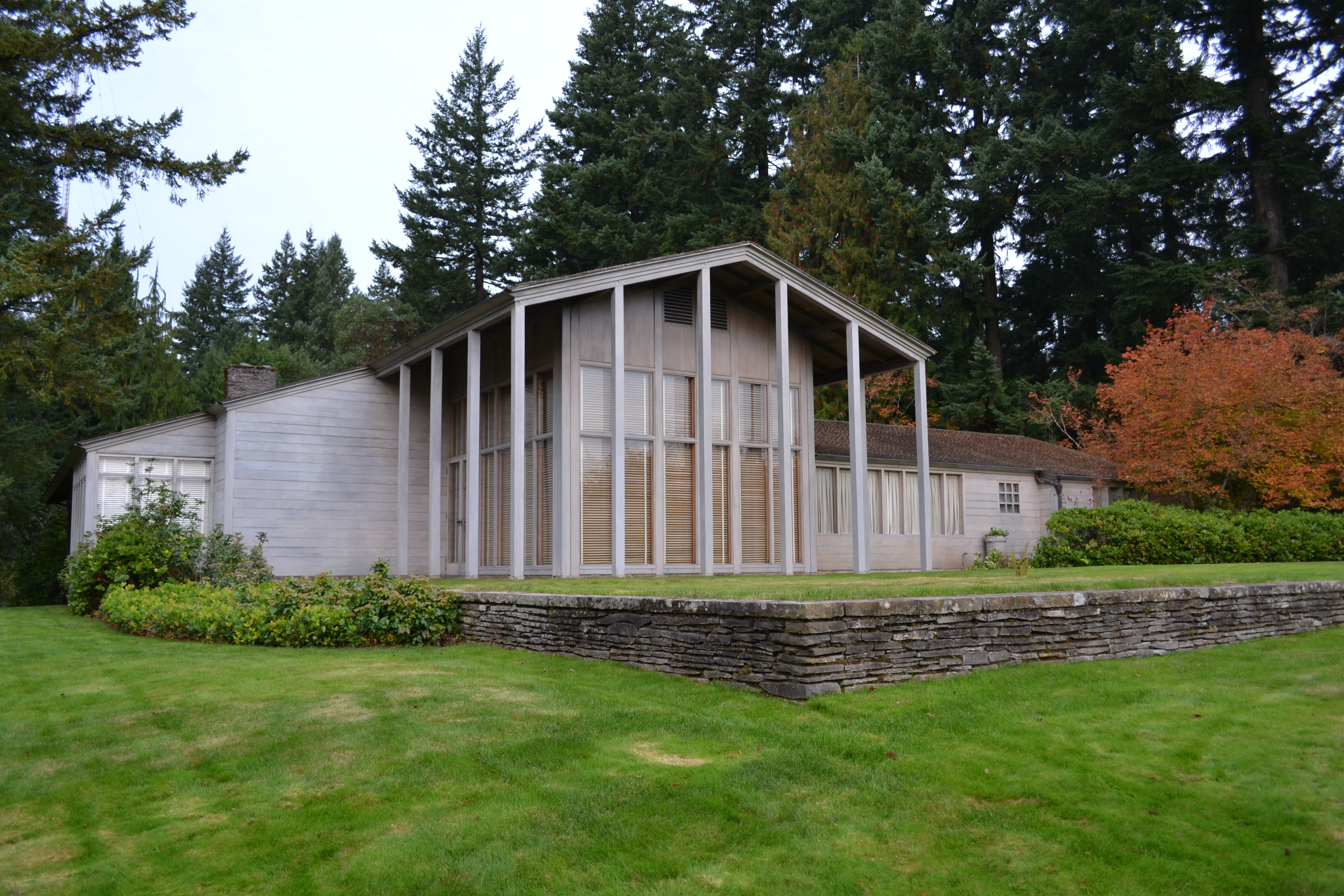

- Location within Portland, Oregon Location within Oregon Location within the United States
- Location: 1061 SW Skyline Boulevard, Portland, Oregon
- Coordinates: 45°30′55″N 122°43′41″W
- Built: 1936
- Architect: John Yeon
- Architectural style: Modern, Northwest Regional
- NRHP reference No.: 74001715

Significant dates
- Added to NRHP: November 1, 1974
- Designated NHL: July 25, 2011

The Aubrey R. Watzek House is a historic house at 1061 SW Skyline Boulevard in Portland, Oregon, United States. Built in 1936–1937 for lumber magnate Aubrey R. Watzek, it was considered a major regional statement of Modern architecture not long after its completion. It was designated a National Historic Landmark on July 25, 2011. It is now part of the University of Oregon's John Yeon Center for Architecture, and is used as a special event facility.

== Description and history ==
The Aubrey R. Watzek House is located in Portland's west side Sylvan-Highlands neighborhood, in a bend of SW Skyline Boulevard between SW Barnes Road and SW Fairview Boulevard. The property affords expansive views to the north, east, and south, including views of Mount Hood. The house is a single-story gable-roofed wood-frame structure, with a U-shaped configuration around a central courtyard. It presents a deceptively modest entrance area to the arriving visitor, with the main entrance set in an otherwise blank wall. The entry opens to the courtyard, which is a garden space with a small pool, and then into a narrow hall from which the rest of the house is gradually revealed. The living room and dining room are sited to provide maximum exposure to the views.

Aubrey Watzek was a lumber magnate, who commissioned John Yeon, then a young architect, to design a house for himself and his mother. Yeon completed the design in 1936, but Watzek initially rejected it. After working for a time with another architect at A.E. Doyle, he accepted Yeon's design. The house was completed in 1937. Watzek lived in the house until his death in January 1973.

The house received immediate notice after its construction, and was included in an architectural exhibition organized by the Museum of Modern Art. Yeon purchased the house after Watzek's death, and it was subsequently taken over by the University of Oregon. It is open for group tours, day meetings, and other special events.

== See also ==
- List of National Historic Landmarks in Oregon
- National Register of Historic Places listings in Southwest Portland, Oregon
