= Tom McCall Waterfront Park =

Public park in Portland, Oregon, U.S.

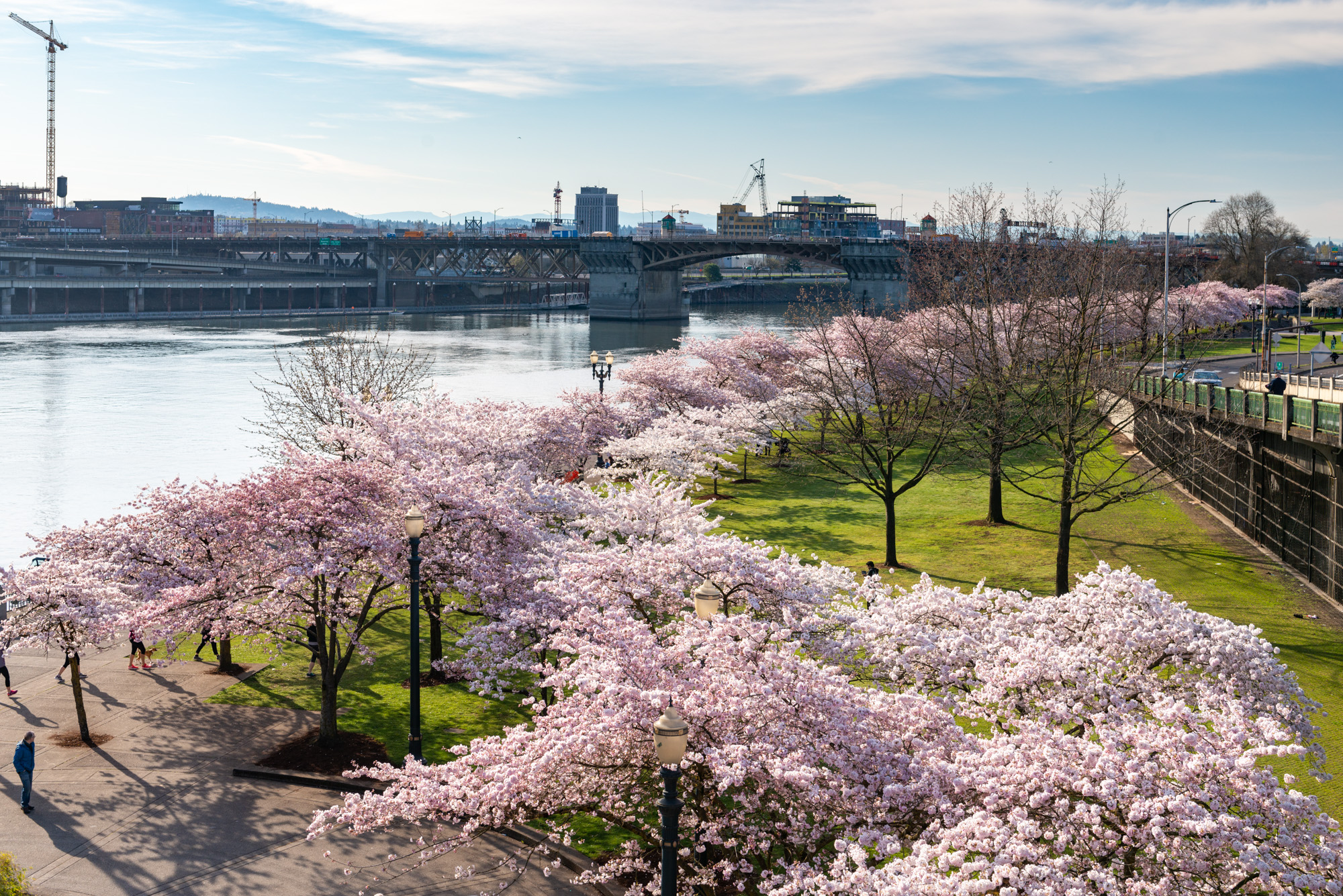
- Cherry blossoms blooming in the park in March 2019
- Interactive map of Tom McCall Waterfront Park
- Location: Naito Pkwy. between SW Harrison St. and NW Glisan St. Portland, Oregon
- Coordinates: 45.516°N 122.6726°W
- Area: 30.90 acres (12.50 ha)
- Operator: Portland Parks & Recreation
- Public transit: North to South: Old Town/Chinatown; Oak St/SW 1st Ave; Yamhill District and Morrison/SW 3rd Ave

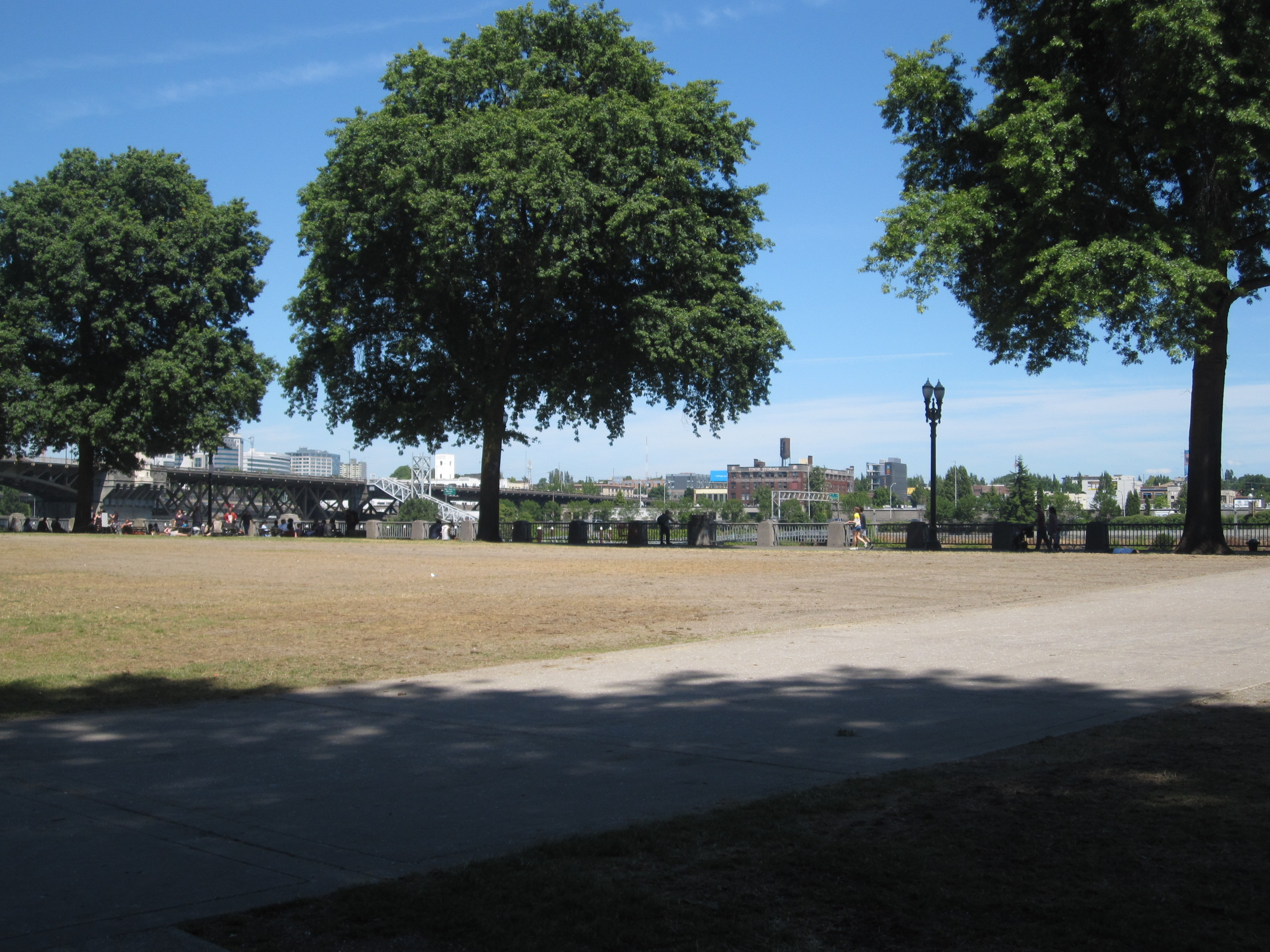
A typical daytime scene on the waterfront (June 2014)

Governor Tom McCall Waterfront Park is a 36.59-acre (148,100 m^{2}) park located in downtown Portland, Oregon, along the Willamette River. After the 1974 removal of Harbor Drive, a major milestone in the freeway removal movement, the park was opened to the public in 1978. The park covers 13 tax lots and is owned by the City of Portland (Portland Parks and Recreation). The park was renamed in 1984 to honor Tom McCall, the Oregon governor who pledged his support for the beautification of the west bank of the Willamette River—harkening back to the City Beautiful plans at the turn of the century which envisioned parks and greenways along the river. The park is bordered by RiverPlace to the south, the Steel Bridge to the north, Naito Parkway to the west, and Willamette River to the east. In October 2012, Waterfront Park was voted one of America's ten greatest public spaces by the American Planning Association.

The most common uses for the park are jogging, walking, biking, skateboarding, fountain play, lunching, basketball, fireworks viewing and boat watching. Due to its recreational use, lunch hours (11:00 am to 1:00 pm) are peak-use hours for the waterfront park. In addition to recreational use, the park is also highly used by bike and pedestrian commuters during rush hours (3:00 pm to 5:00 pm) because the park is easily accessible to the downtown Portland workforce and provides a pleasant, off street thoroughfare away from vehicular traffic. It is currently home to the Waterfront Blues Festival, Oregon Brewers Festival, Gay/Lesbian Pride Festival and the Bite of Oregon festival. The park is also the host of many Rose Festival events.

== History ==
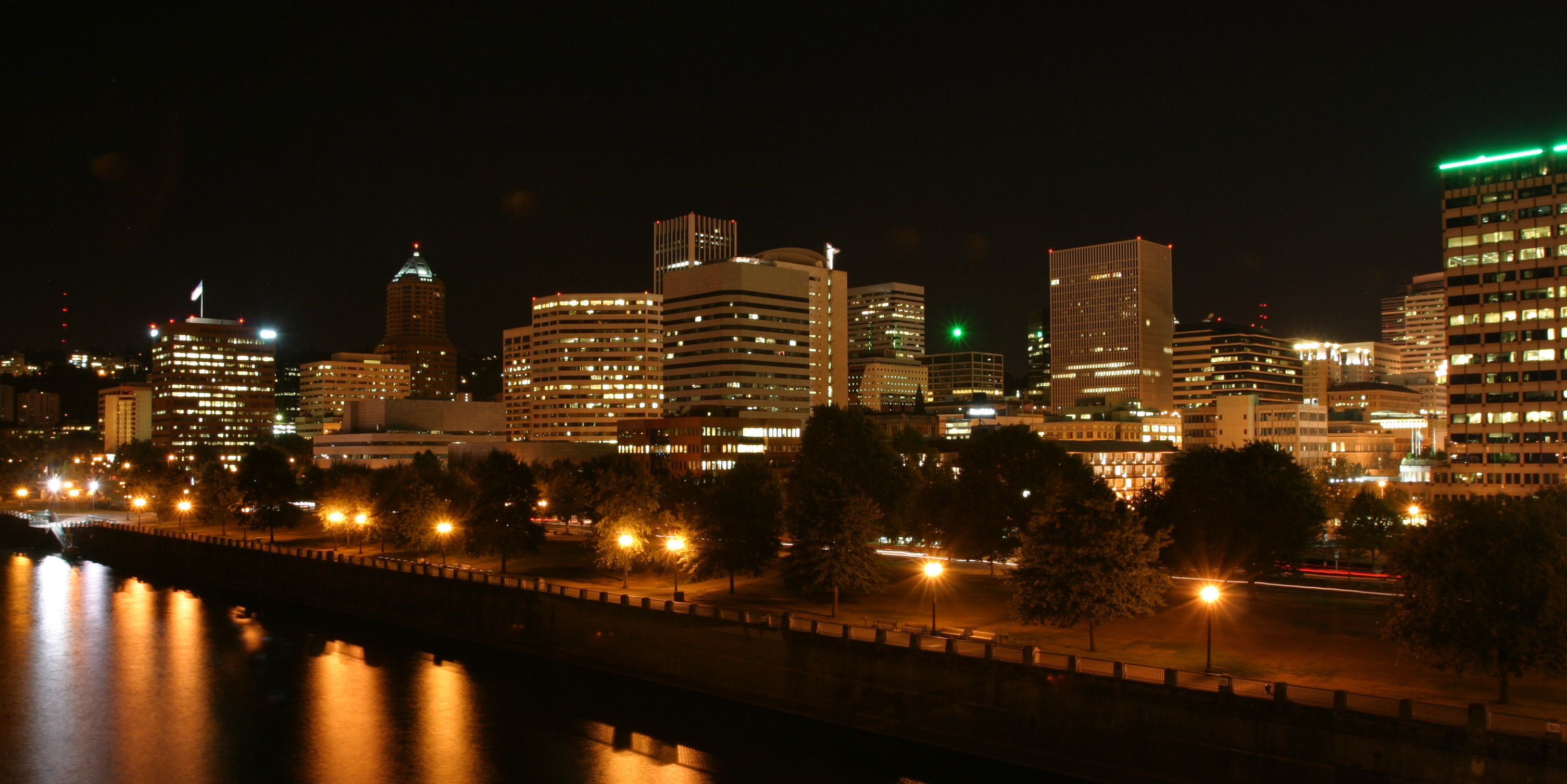
Tom McCall Waterfront Park at night, from the Morrison Bridge (August 2005)

In 1903 the Olmsted Report identified several needs for the City of Portland. Important items within the plan:

- need for parks within the city
- need for greenways along riverbanks
- need for preservation of river access for future generations

These needs were readdressed in the 1912 Bennett Plan; however, the City of Portland had its sights set on the city itself and not on access to geographical features.

One problem for downtown Portland and its location on the Willamette was that the river would flood occasionally during the winter. In 1920, a seawall was built to protect the downtown core. The seawall removed access to the river, a problem that would be exacerbated in 1940 with the construction of Harbor Drive along the bank of the river.

In the mid-1960s, the completion of the Marquam Bridge for Interstate 5 led to a drop in Harbor Drive traffic. The Waterfront for People, a humorous civil disobedience group, organized a picnic on the sliver of land between Harbor Drive and the river. In 1968, Governor Tom McCall initiated a task force to study the feasibility of replacing Harbor Drive with open park space. ZGF Architects LLP was hired in 1971 to design the park. Removal of Harbor Drive began in 1974, and work progressed until the dedication of the park in 1978. The park gained instant popularity, and in 1984 it was renamed Governor Tom McCall Waterfront Park. Along with Harbor Drive, the Portland Public Market building also stood where Waterfront Park is now.

In 1978, the Francis Murnane Wharf, the only public memorial to a labor leader in the state of Oregon, was dedicated in the park by Harry Bridges, president of the International Longshore and Warehouse Union. The memorial consisted of a bronze plaque and steps leading down to a floating dock on the Willamette River. Murnane was a leader of Portland ILWU Local 8 and a gadfly for historic preservation. In 2009, the plaque and steps were removed by the expansion of the Saturday Market.

=== Citizen partnership ===
A large part of the creation of Governor Tom McCall Waterfront Park was the engagement of citizens to shape the design and uses for the property throughout its development. In 1969, an analysis sponsored by the Portland City Club was conducted to make a case for creating a waterfront park. The Portland City Club is a citizen-based research organization that conducts civic salons and publishes reports. In 1972, the creation of tax increment-funded Waterfront Urban Renewal District was proposed by the Downtown Plan Citizen Advisory Committee, which consisted of 18 private citizens of downtown Portland. In 2002–2003, the Waterfront Park Master Plan was updated through citizen workshops, surveys, and public meetings with an average attendance of 500 private citizens.

== Park zones ==
The park can generally be divided into five distinct zones.

=== The Esplanade ===
The Esplanade is a paved walkway along the river, part of a riverfront corridor extending on both sides of the Willamette River within which “river recreational” uses are promoted. Greenway regulations define this zone as 25' from the top of the bank. In Waterfront Park, the greenway zone includes the walkway and part of the adjacent lawn areas as well.

=== The Bowl ===
The Bowl is a relatively wide grass-lawn area that slopes down to the water just south of the Hawthorne Bridge. It anchors the southern end of the park, abutting the RiverPlace residential and commercial development. It functions as an informal amphitheater for concerts, including Oregon Symphony concerts and the Waterfront Blues Festival. The bowl also serves as the site of annual dragon boat races during the Portland Rose Festival. The beach along the river is known as Tom McCall Bowl Beach.

=== Salmon Street Springs ===
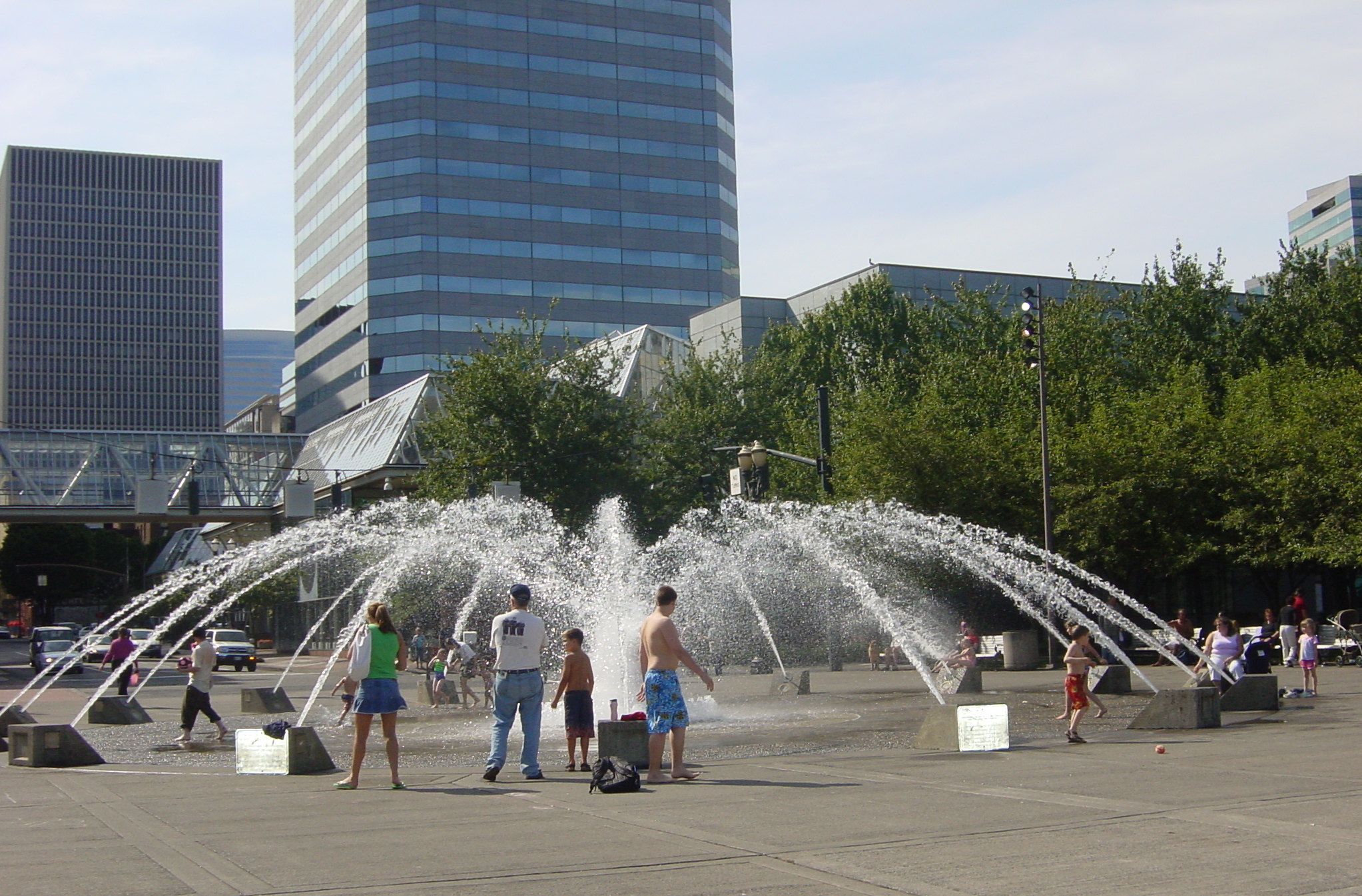
Salmon Street Springs in summer (July 2005)

Salmon Street Springs and the John Yeon building anchor the area north of Hawthorne Bridge. The fountain is set in a concrete plaza, which includes a set of sitting steps that leads to a viewing area over the river.

=== John Yeon Building ===
The current occupant of the historic John Yeon building, which abuts the fountain to the south, is the Portland Rose Festival Foundation. This area also acts as the moorage and embarking site for the Portland Spirit, a small cruise ship that provides 2-hour trips on the Willamette River.

=== The central lawn ===
The central lawn is a dominant feature of the park, extending from Salmon Street Springs to the Burnside Bridge. The lawn is used most intensively during the summer by a series of outdoor festivals and events.

== Park landmarks ==
=== Battleship Oregon Memorial ===
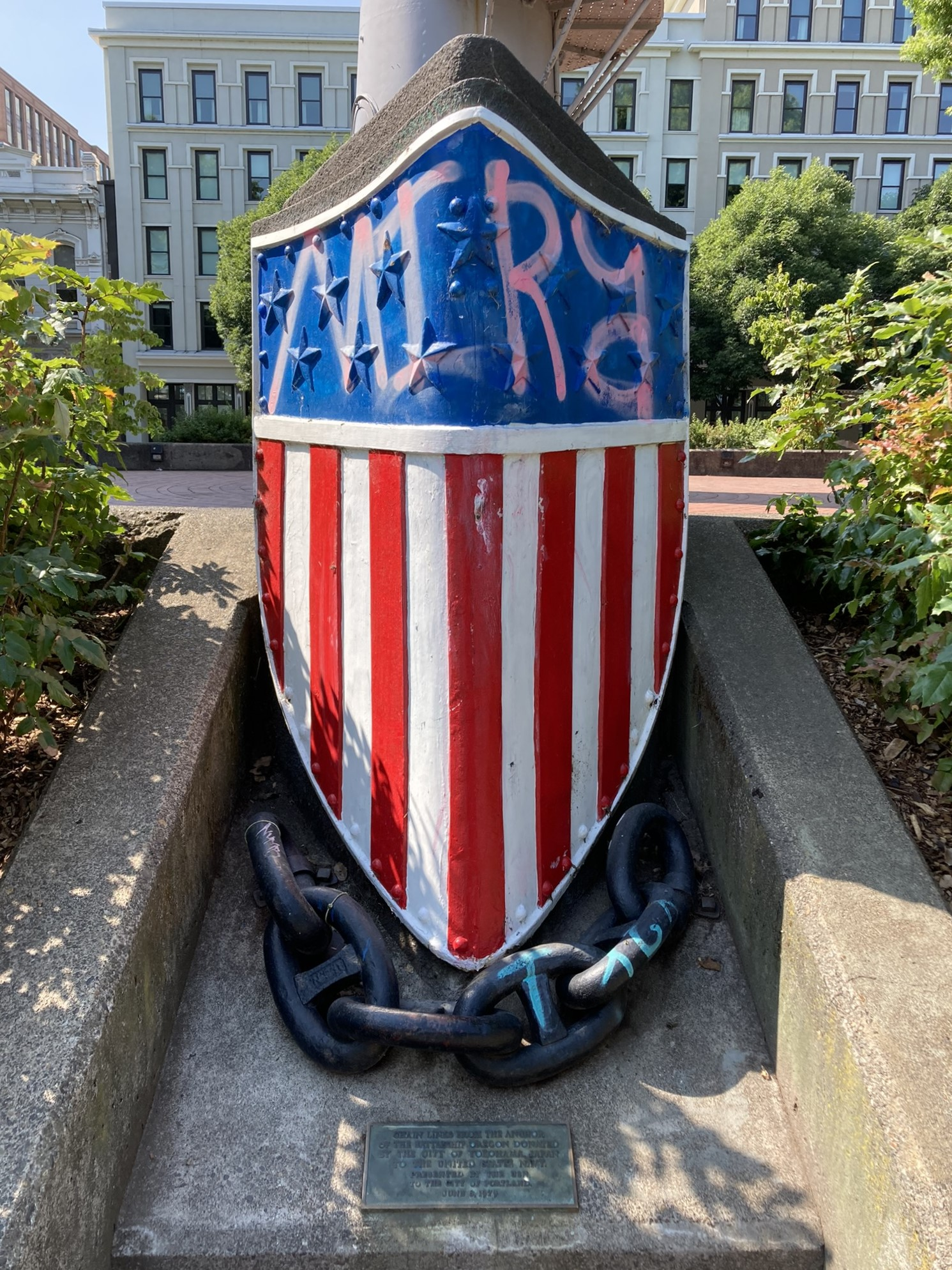
Graffiti on the USS Oregon Memorial at Tom McCall Waterfront Park, August 2023

The USS Oregon was constructed in 1893. This memorial, erected in 1956, honors this "Bulldog of the US Navy" and its heroic fight in many naval battles. Underneath the memorial lies a time capsule: sealed on Independence Day, 1976, it will be unearthed and opened July 5, 2076. In recent years, the memorial has been repeatedly painted with graffiti on multiple occasions; the city has not kept up with maintaining the monument, and the signage has been heavily cracked and weathered by the sun.

=== Bill Naito Legacy Fountain ===
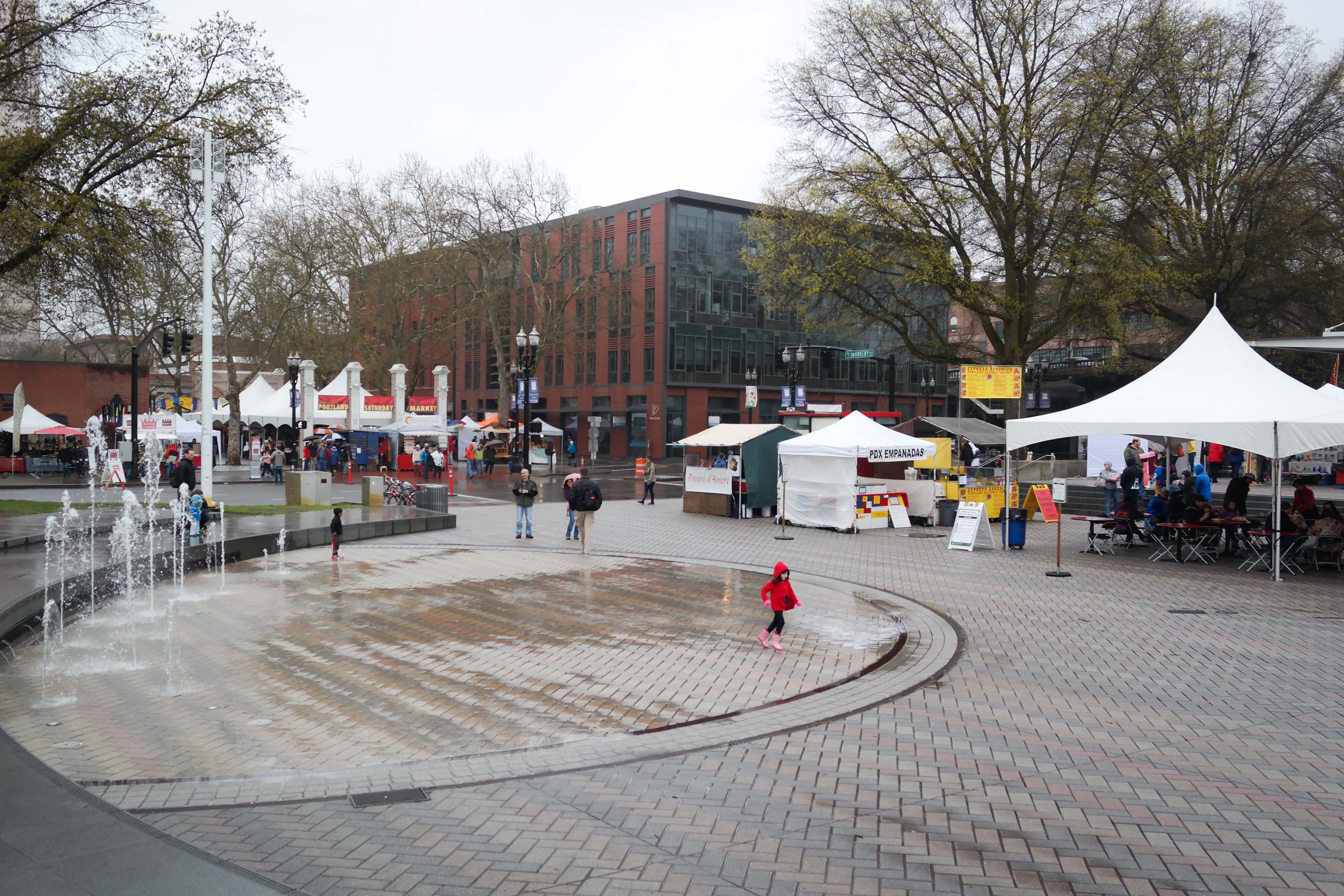
The Bill Naito Legacy Fountain (April 2014)

This interactive fountain is dedicated to the memory of Portland businessman Bill Naito. It was opened in 2009 next to the Saturday Market Pavilion.

=== Founders' Stone ===
This memorial honors William Pettygrove and Asa Lovejoy, who tossed a coin to determine the city's name. Had the outcome gone the other way, Portland would have been named after Boston, Massachusetts, instead of Portland, Maine.

=== Friendship Circle ===
Friendship Circle, located at the north end of Waterfront Park, was dedicated in 1990. It celebrates the sister city relationship between Portland and Sapporo, Japan. The Friendship Circle includes a pair of 20-foot stainless towers that generate electronic tones.

=== Japanese American Historical Plaza ===
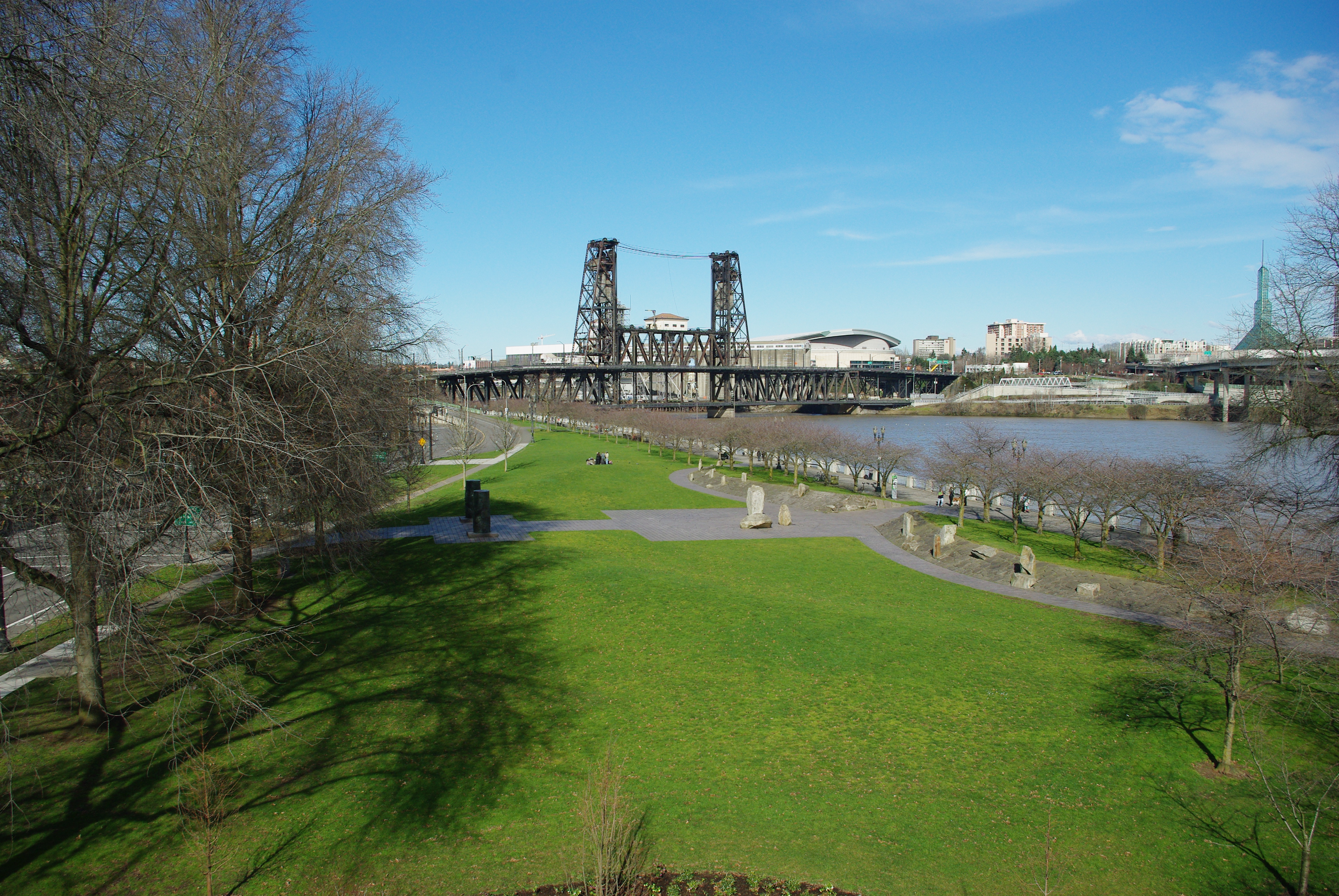
The Japanese American Historical Plaza (February 2011)

This memorial was dedicated on August 3, 1990, in memory of Japanese immigrants and native-born U.S. citizens of Japanese descent who were deported to inland internment camps during World War II. The memorial includes artwork and sculpture that tells the story of Japanese people in the Pacific Northwest. There are one hundred ornamental cherry trees to the north of the plaza.

=== Police memorial ===
The police memorial was constructed in 1993 at Southwest Jefferson adjacent to the Hawthorne Bridge. It is dedicated to Portland Police who have laid down their lives in the line of duty.

=== Rose Building ===
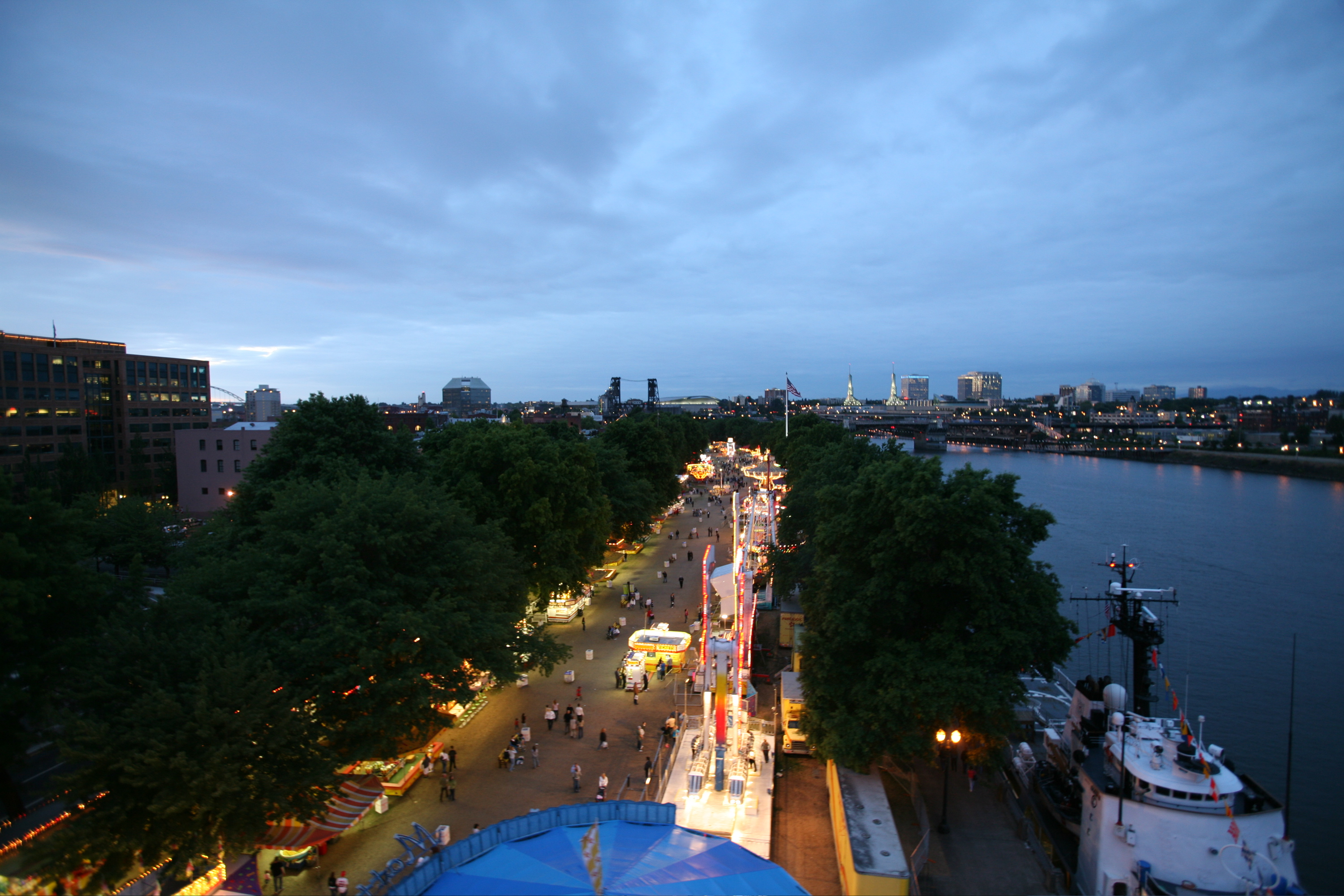
The Portland Rose Festival held in the park (June 2007)

The Portland Rose Festival Foundation headquarters are located in a historic Northwest Modernist building designed by noted Portland architect John Yeon in 1948 to be the Portland Visitors Information Center.

=== Salmon Street Springs ===
Salmon Street Springs is an artistic and play fountain that is extremely popular in the summer. It was dedicated in 1988 and recycles up to 4,924 US gallons (18,640 L) of water per minute through as many as 137 jets.

=== Saturday Market Pavilion ===
A contemporary open-sided pavilion just north of the Bill Naito Legacy Fountain shelters Portland's Saturday Market on the weekends from March until December.

=== Sternwheeler Portland ===
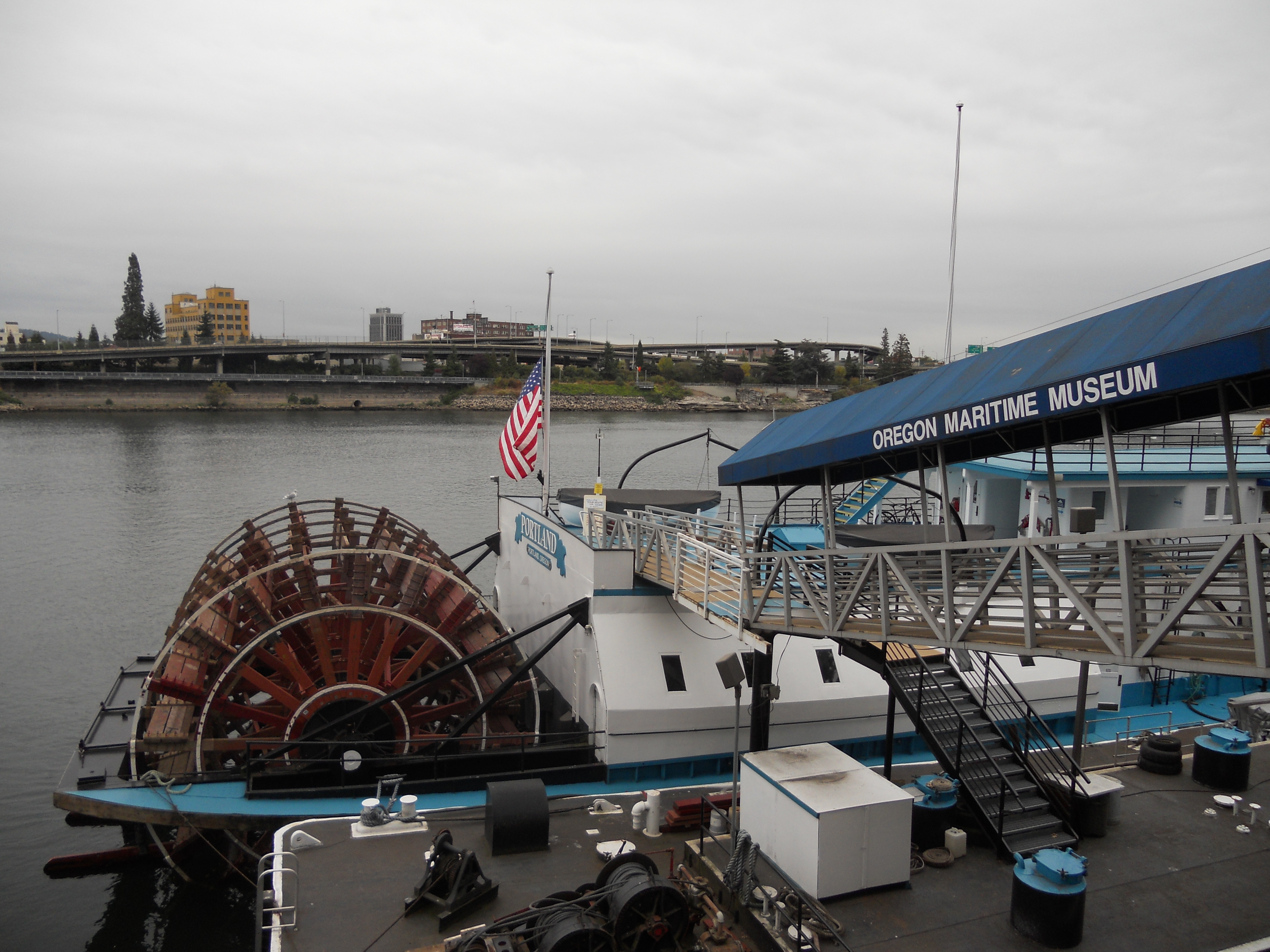
The Oregon Maritime Center and Museum (October 2011)

The 1947 sternwheeler Portland, docked at Waterfront Park, houses the Oregon Maritime Center and Museum. The sternwheeler is only sporadically accessible, as the museum does not abide by its posted open hours and is frequently closed without notice.

== Political significance ==
The park has also been used as a speaking place during U.S. presidential campaigns in recent years. During the 2004 U.S. presidential election, an estimated 50,000 people gathered in the park to see John Kerry, and during the 2008 U.S. presidential election, an estimated 75,000 people (the largest gathering in the campaign) gathered to see Barack Obama.

== See also ==
- Ankeny pumping station
- Fleet Week (Portland, Oregon)
- Sculpture Stage (1976)
