= John Yeon =

American architect

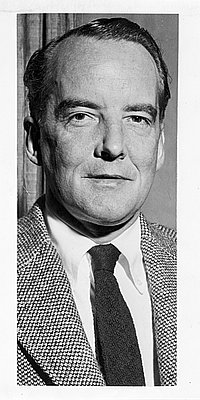
- Born: October 29, 1910; Portland, Oregon, U.S.
- Died: March 13, 1994 (aged 83); Portland, Oregon, U.S.
- Occupation: Architect
- Awards: Brunner Prize, Aubrey Watzek Award, Distinguished Service Award (University of Oregon)

John Yeon (October 29, 1910 – March 13, 1994) was an American architect in Portland, Oregon, in the mid-twentieth century. He is regarded as one of the early practitioners of the Northwest Regional style of Modernism. Largely self-taught, Yeon’s wide ranging activities encompassed planning, conservation, historic preservation, art collecting, and urban activism. He was a connoisseur of objets d’art as well as landscapes, and one of Oregon’s most gifted architectural designers, even while his output was limited.

The family name is pronounced "yawn," not "yee-on."

== Early life ==
John Yeon was born in Portland on October 29, 1910, the son of John B. Yeon and Elizabeth Mock Yeon. The elder was a lumber baron and construction manager who oversaw the building of the Columbia River Highway, and developer of Portland's Yeon Building. The younger Yeon was largely raised in Portland and attended Allen Preparatory School in that city. But he also attended the Moran School in Washington State, where he did some of his earliest design work. After he completed high school, he left for California to attend Stanford University. An autodidact and polymath, Yeon attended the college for just a single semester before leaving and never became a licensed architect.

== Architecture ==
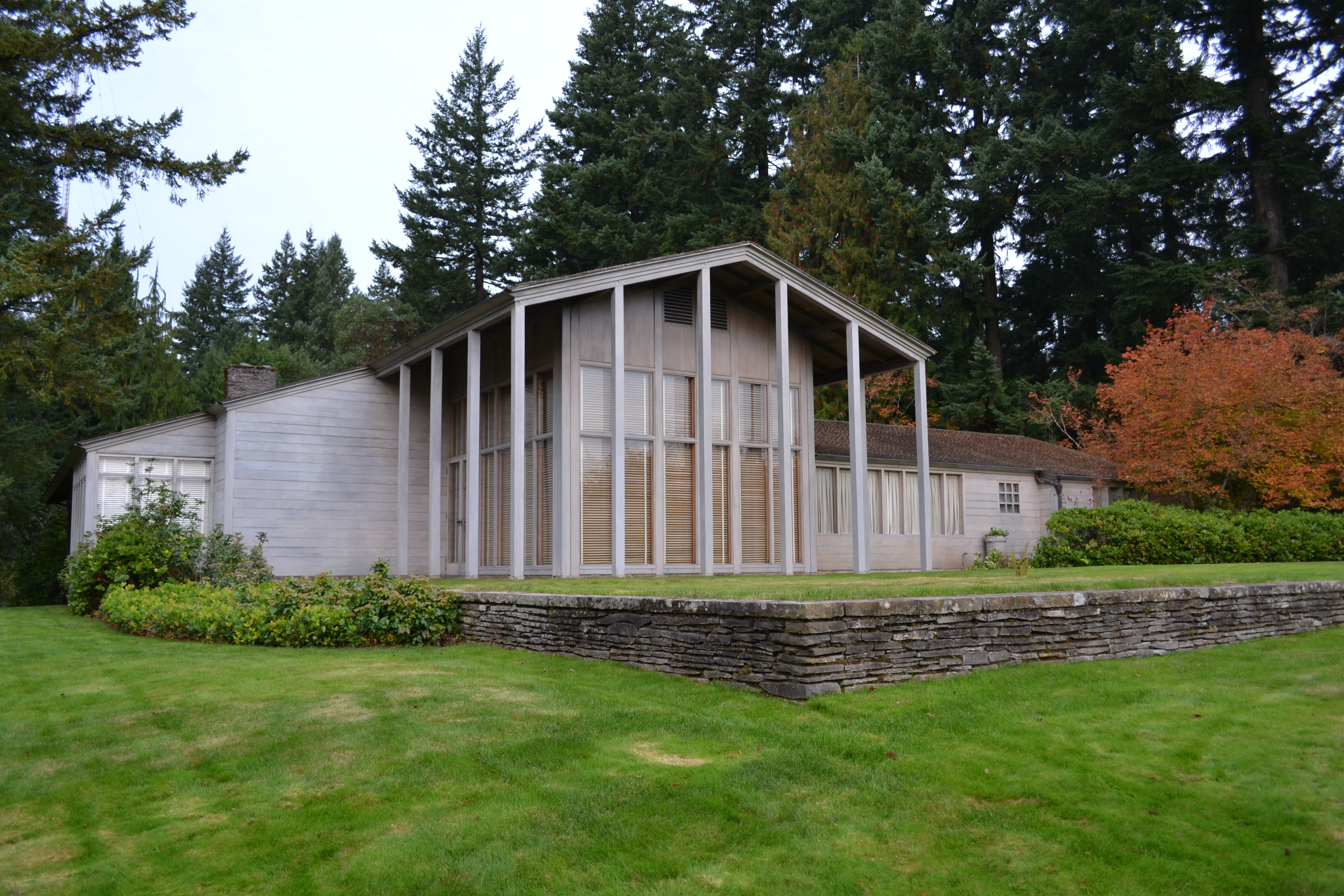
Watzek House

His first built work–the 1937 Watzek House–was included in a 1939 publication and accompanying exhibition by the Museum of Modern Art. His most notable works include the aforementioned Aubrey R. Watzek House (1937) and the Portland Visitors Information Center (1949), both of which were featured in exhibits at the Museum of Modern Art in New York City. The Watzek house is listed on the National Register of Historic Places. The John Yeon Speculative House (1939), one of the best-preserved of his nine "speculative house" series, was added to the National Register of Historic Places in August 2007. Yeon also designed museum exhibitions, including those for the Portland Art Museum, Nelson-Atkins Museum of Art, Asian Art Museum in San Francisco, and the Palace of the Legion of Honor.

In 1956, Yeon was awarded the Brunner Prize for architecture by the National Institute of Arts. The University of Oregon awarded him a Distinguished Service Award in 1977, and Lewis & Clark College gave him its annual Aubrey Watzek Award in 1980.

John Yeon died in Portland on Sunday, March 13, 1994, of congestive heart failure. He was interred at the Portland Memorial Mausoleum.

== The John Yeon Center ==
A gift on behalf of the estate of John Yeon was made to the University of Oregon School of Architecture and Allied Arts, which established the John Yeon Center for Architecture and the John Yeon Preserve for Landscape Studies. The John Yeon Center has also sponsored a John Yeon Lecture Series. Part of the University of Oregon’s School of Architecture and Allied Arts, the Center manages and programs three properties designed by Yeon: the Watzek House (1937), a National Historic Landmark; the Cottrell House (1952), and the Shire, a 75-acre park in the Columbia River Gorge.

== Retrospective ==
Quest for Beauty: The Architecture, Landscapes, and Collections of John Yeon, a major retrospective of Yeon's work, opened at the Portland Art Museum on May 13 and ran through September 3, 2017. The exhibit was designed by Lever Architecture of Portland, OR. Two monographs, John Yeon: Architecture and John Yeon: Landscape, were published by Andrea Monfried Editions in conjunction with the exhibition. Illustrated with drawings, plans and photographs, the books include essays by the director of the John Yeon Center, Randy Gragg, and other contributors, who explore his approach and contextualize his influence.
