= Harbor Drive =

Former freeway in Portland, Oregon

Coordinates: 45.516°N 122.6726°W

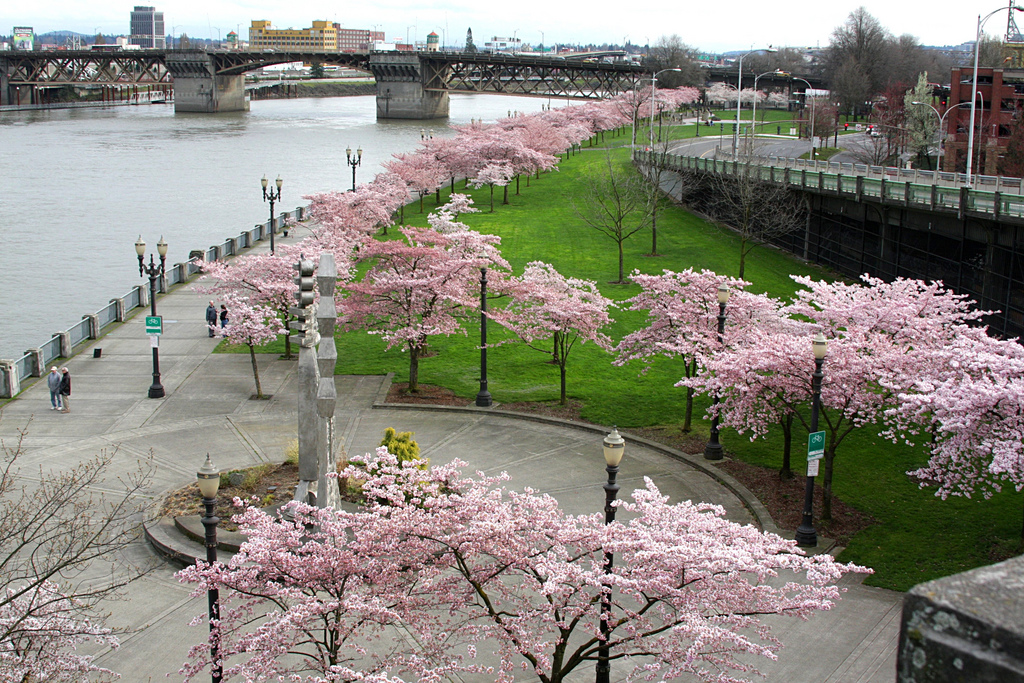
- Cherry blossoms blooming in Tom McCall Waterfront Park, created with the removal of the road in 1978
- Interactive map of Harbor Drive
- Former name: Front Avenue
- Maintained by: PBOT
- Length: 0.7 mi (1.1 km)
- Location: Portland, Oregon
- South end: I-5 in RiverPlace
- North end: US 26 / Naito Parkway in Downtown
- East: Harbor Drive
- West: Naito Parkway

Construction
- Completed: 1943

Harbor Drive is a short roadway in Portland, Oregon, spanning a total length of 0.7 miles (1.1 km), which primarily functions as a ramp to and from Interstate 5. It was once much longer, running along the western edge of the Willamette River in the downtown area. Originally constructed from 1942–43, the vast majority of the road was replaced with Tom McCall Waterfront Park in the 1970s. Signed as U.S. Route 99W, it had been the major route through the city and its removal is often cited as the first instance of freeway removal in the U.S. and as a milestone in urban planning; the original road is remembered as the first limited-access highway built in the city.

== History ==
=== Construction ===
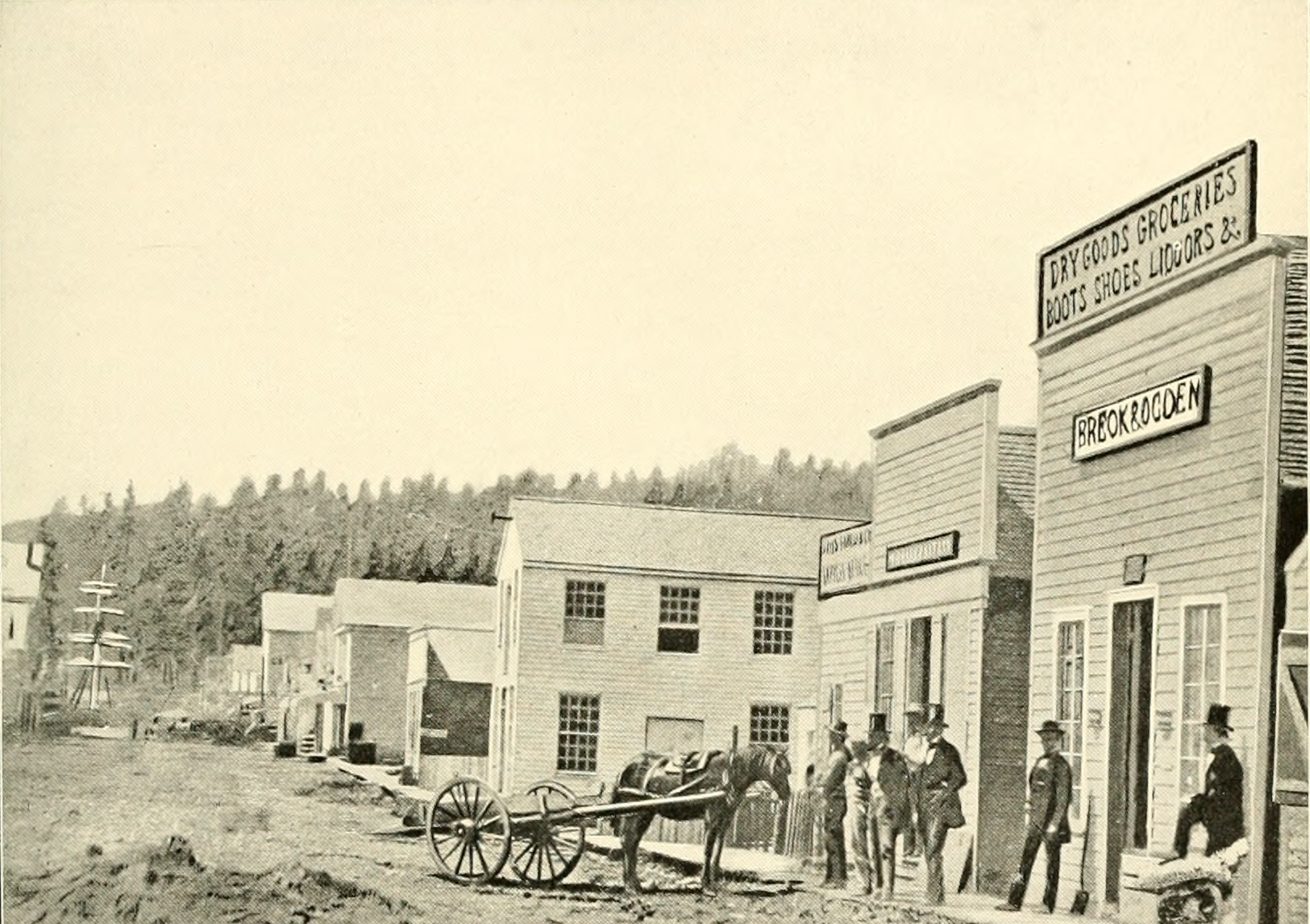
An early view of Front Avenue, 100 years prior to the construction of Harbor Drive

Harbor Drive opened in stages from 1942 to 1943, with a formal dedication on November 20, 1942, and completion of the last work in 1943. Seventy-nine buildings and houses were demolished, mostly along Front Avenue, to make room for Harbor Drive. Although the project was criticized for the removal of some historic buildings and for the fact that the new roadway would impede the public's access to the waterfront, most civic organizations supported it, and a majority of the public also indicated its support by approving in 1940 a $1.25 million bond measure (65,000 to 35,000 votes) to help fund the project, which included the city's acquisition of all property between Front Avenue and the river along the stretch from Glisan to Columbia streets.

The roadway served as the route of US 99W (locally called "Highway 99W") into downtown Portland from the south. The highway came from Barbur Boulevard and ran through the downtown area via a couplet on 4th and 6th avenues. US 99W then crossed the Willamette River on the Broadway Bridge towards Interstate Avenue, where it headed north to the Interstate Bridge and the city of Vancouver, Washington.

In 1950, a controlled-access highway, though crude by modern standards, opened and was at least partly known as Harbor Drive. It started with an interchange with Barbur Boulevard, joined the Willamette shore near an interchange with Clay and Market streets, and then ran along the shore to the Steel Bridge. US 99W then crossed the Steel Bridge, and turned north on a controlled-access extension to Interstate Avenue, until it resumed its old routing at an interchange with the Broadway Bridge. It was the first freeway to be completed in Portland, and the only north–south freeway for over a decade.

In 1955, construction was approved on a new series of interchanges at Market and Clay streets to replace the existing at-grade intersections. This was competed in 1958.

One block west of Harbor Drive was Front Avenue, then a minor street, and one block west of that was 1st Avenue. Many industrial and commercial buildings, including the Portland Public Market building, were located between Harbor and Front. Harbor Drive connected to the downtown streets, the Hawthorne Bridge and the Morrison Bridge via a series of interchanges.

In 1961, a new freeway (which at the time extended from Eugene to Tigard) was completed to the existing Harbor Drive in downtown Portland, and signed as Interstate 5 and (temporarily) as U.S. Route 99. In 1966, the Marquam Bridge and the Minnesota Street Freeway were completed, thus making I-5 a contiguous freeway from the California to Washington borders, and making Harbor Drive obsolete as a long-haul thoroughfare.

The Olmsted Report (1903) and also the Bennett Plan (1912) had proposed an urban greenway to preserve the Willamette riverfront; however, the Harbor Drive Freeway restricted pedestrian access to the riverfront in 1943 and the Oregon State Highway Department had proposals to extend Harbor Drive. Oregon Governor Tom McCall halted expansion and created a task force to study options for replacing Harbor Drive with a public place. The task force recommended closure and conversion to a park. During this period, there was growing resistance to the construction of additional proposed freeways both in Portland and elsewhere in the United States. The opening of the Fremont Bridge in 1973, which completed Interstate 405, resulted in a second Interstate through the downtown area, but accomplished a reduction in traffic levels on Harbor Drive. Harbor Drive was permanently closed north of Market Street in May 1974. Construction soon began on a new park, Waterfront Park. In addition, the buildings between Front Avenue and Harbor Drive were demolished, and Front Avenue (since renamed Naito Parkway after Bill Naito, a local businessman and philanthropist) was widened to a boulevard. The southernmost segment of Harbor Drive connecting to I-5 southbound and from I-5 northbound, and has two intermediate intersections with traffic signals that provide access to the RiverPlace district. As all ramps to/from the continuation of I-5 as well as I-405 exit and enter from the right, it can be thought of as the default route for those traveling on I-5. Few signs identify it as such; the exit signs on the freeway indicate the route leads to Naito Parkway, and directional signs heading south all say "To I-5". One other remnant of Harbor Drive is a small portion of a ramp stub from the Hawthorne Bridge; the majority of which has been removed due to construction of the new county courthouse. Waterfront Park opened on the land formerly occupied by the highway in 1978 and is a popular destination for sightseers and picnickers, as well as a site for civic events such as the Rose Festival fun center.

In 2016, a bike lane opened on the road.

== Legacy ==
In addition to creating a major recreation facility for the city of Portland, the closure of Harbor Drive is widely considered a significant event in urban planning – the first time a freeway had ever been removed without being replaced. It (along with the subsequent cancellation of Interstate 505 and the Mount Hood Freeway) cemented Portland's reputation as a model of pedestrian- and transit-friendly design. Since the completion of Interstate 205 in the mid 1980s, no new freeways have been built in the city other than a short realignment of U.S. Route 30 near the Fremont Bridge.

== See also ==
- Highway revolt
- List of streets in Portland, Oregon
