= Tilikum Crossing =

Bridge over the Willamette River, Portland, OR, USA

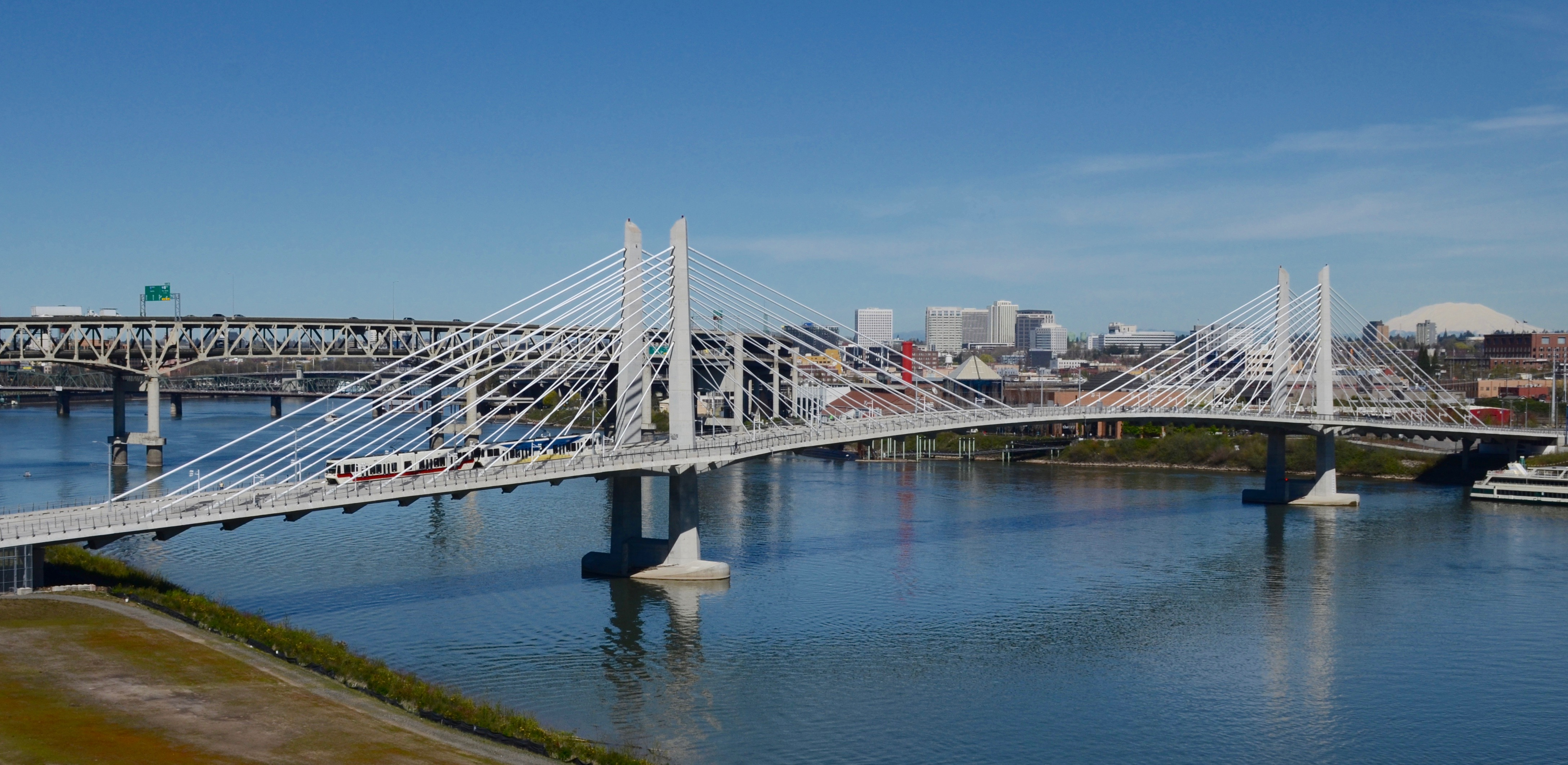
- The bridge in 2016 with a MAX light rail train crossing it
- Coordinates: 45.5049°N 122.6670°W
- Carries: TriMet MAX light rail and buses; Portland Streetcar Loop Service; bicycles and pedestrians
- Crosses: Willamette River
- Locale: Portland, Oregon
- Official name: Tilikum Crossing, Bridge of the People
- Owner: TriMet

Characteristics
- Design: cable-stayed
- Total length: 1,720 feet (520 m)
- Height: 180 feet (55 m)
- Longest span: 780 feet (240 m)
- No. of spans: 5
- Piers in water: 2
- Clearance below: 77.5 feet (23.6 m)

History
- Architect: Donald MacDonald
- Designer: T.Y. Lin International
- Construction start: June 2011
- Construction end: 2014 (of bridge only, not surface infrastructure)
- Opened: September 12, 2015

Location
- Interactive map of Tilikum Crossing

Tilikum Crossing, Bridge of the People is a cable-stayed bridge across the Willamette River in Portland, Oregon, United States. It was designed by TriMet, the Portland metropolitan area's regional transit authority, for its MAX Orange Line light rail passenger trains. The bridge also serves city buses and the Portland Streetcar, as well as bicycles, pedestrians, and emergency vehicles. Private cars and trucks are not permitted on the bridge. It is the first major bridge in the U.S. that was designed to allow access to transit vehicles, cyclists and pedestrians but not cars.

Construction began in 2011, and the bridge was officially opened on September 12, 2015. In homage to Native American civilizations, the bridge was named after the Chinook Jargon word for people. The Tilikum Crossing was the first new bridge to be opened across the Willamette River in the Portland metropolitan area since the Fremont Bridge, in 1973.

== Route and function ==
Tilikum Crossing has its western terminus in the city's South Waterfront area, and stretches across the river to the Central Eastside district. In the 21st century, these two industrial zones have been evolving into mixed residential and commercial neighborhoods, and new transit accommodations are required by the growing populations. Both districts, however, are limited by antiquated road infrastructure that was deemed incapable of handling the increased traffic that could be expected from a conventional automobile bridge. The primary rationale for the bridge was thus "first and foremost as a conduit for a light-rail line."

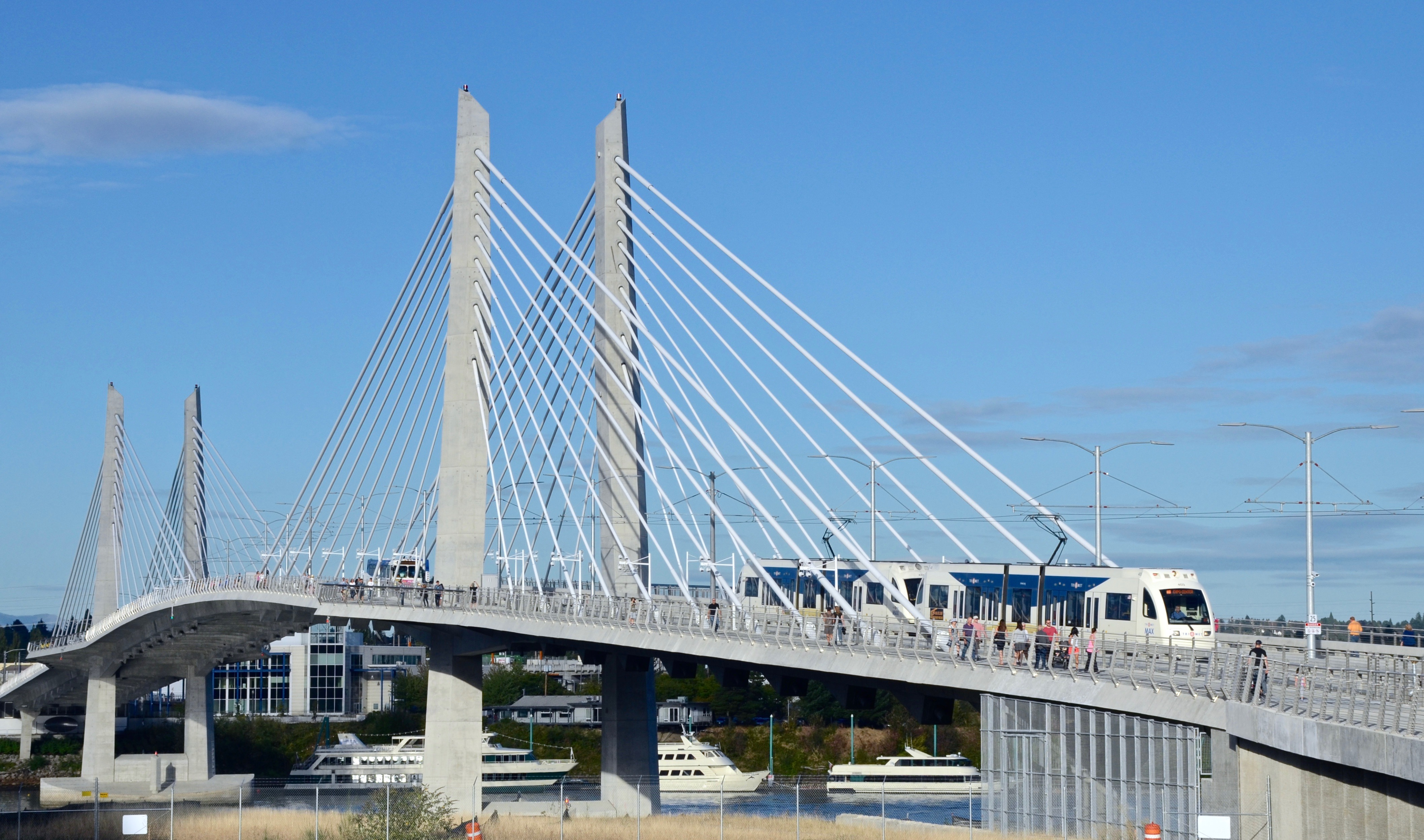
Viewed from the west with a MAX train and a bus crossing the bridge

The bridge is south of, and approximately parallel to, the Marquam Bridge. The west "landing" is midway between the Marquam and Ross Island Bridges, and the east landing is just north of Southeast Caruthers Street, with the east approach viaduct reaching the surface at the west end of Sherman Street, which the tracks follow to a new Oregon Museum of Science and Industry (OMSI) MAX station located near an existing Portland Streetcar station and the Oregon Rail Heritage Center.

Although the planned MAX Orange Line was the impetus for construction of the bridge, the structure also carries TriMet buses, the Portland Streetcar Loop Service and emergency vehicles, and is open for public use by bicyclists and pedestrians. Use by private motor vehicles (except emergency vehicles) is not permitted. Rerouting of TriMet bus routes onto the new bridge from more-congested crossings will shorten the travel time for riders on those routes. Bike and pedestrian paths line both sides of the bridge and are 14 feet (4.3 m) wide. The bridge connects a MAX station at OMSI on the east side of the river with a new OHSU/South Waterfront Campus MAX station on the west side. OHSU is the city's largest employer, while OMSI is one of the city's largest tourist and educational venues, and the new bridge facilitates the connection of both to the regional MAX light rail system. The Orange Line continues south from OMSI to Milwaukie and northern Oak Grove and north from South Waterfront into downtown Portland.

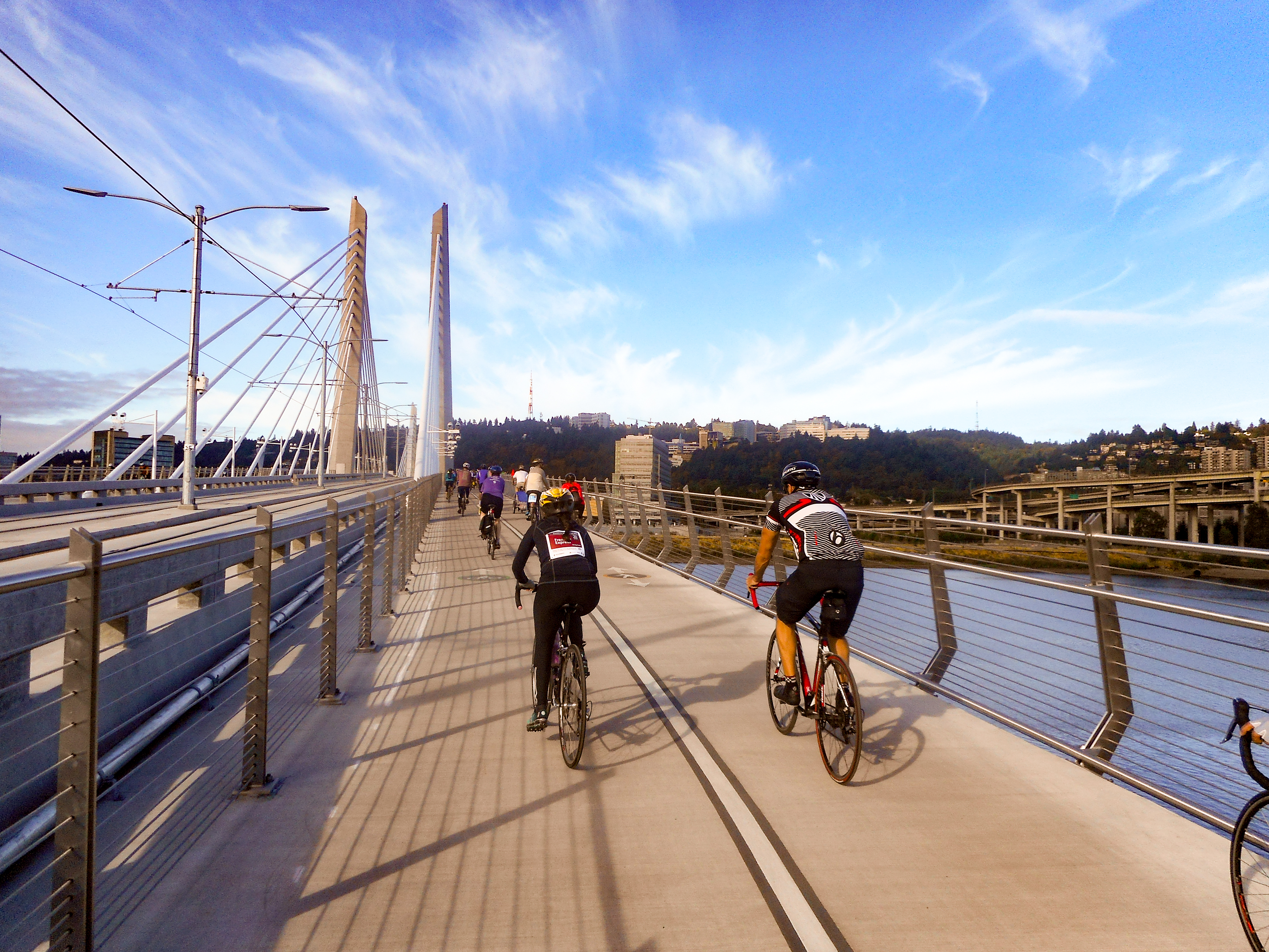
Bicyclists riding across the bridge during the Providence Bridge Pedal

Two bus lines moved to the new bridge from the Ross Island Bridge on September 13, 2015: Lines 9-Powell and 17-Holgate/Broadway. Line 2-Division was moved to the new bridge from the Hawthorne Bridge when it became the FX 2-Division, on September 18, 2022.

== Design ==
City planners initially focused on three designs: cable-stayed, wave-frame girder, and through arch, but the design committee eventually recommended a hybrid suspension/cable-stayed design by architect, Miguel Rosales. Despite the recommendation, TriMet chose a cable-stayed option by MacDonald Architects in order to reduce cost. MacDonald had previously designed the similar Eastern span replacement of the San Francisco–Oakland Bay Bridge.

T.Y. Lin International (TYLI), Engineer of Record on the Tilikum Crossing project, designed the distinctive, 180-foot-tall (55 m), pentagonal shaped stay-cable towers as the bridge's focal point. The 1,720-foot-long (520 m) bridge also features two landside piers and two in-water piers. The 780-foot-long (240 m) main span deck is separated into a 31-foot-wide (9.4 m) transitway between the tower legs to accommodate two lanes of track and two flanking multi-use paths for pedestrians and cyclists.

Cable saddles were incorporated in TYLI's bridge design to allow for more slender, solid towers and a cleaner bridge profile. Tilikum Crossing is the first bridge in the U.S. to use the Freyssinet multi-tube saddle design, which allows each cable to run continuously from the deck, through the top of the tower and back down to the other side. Approximately 3.5 miles (5.6 km) of cables run continuously through the tower saddle, instead of terminating in each tower.

=== Lighting ===
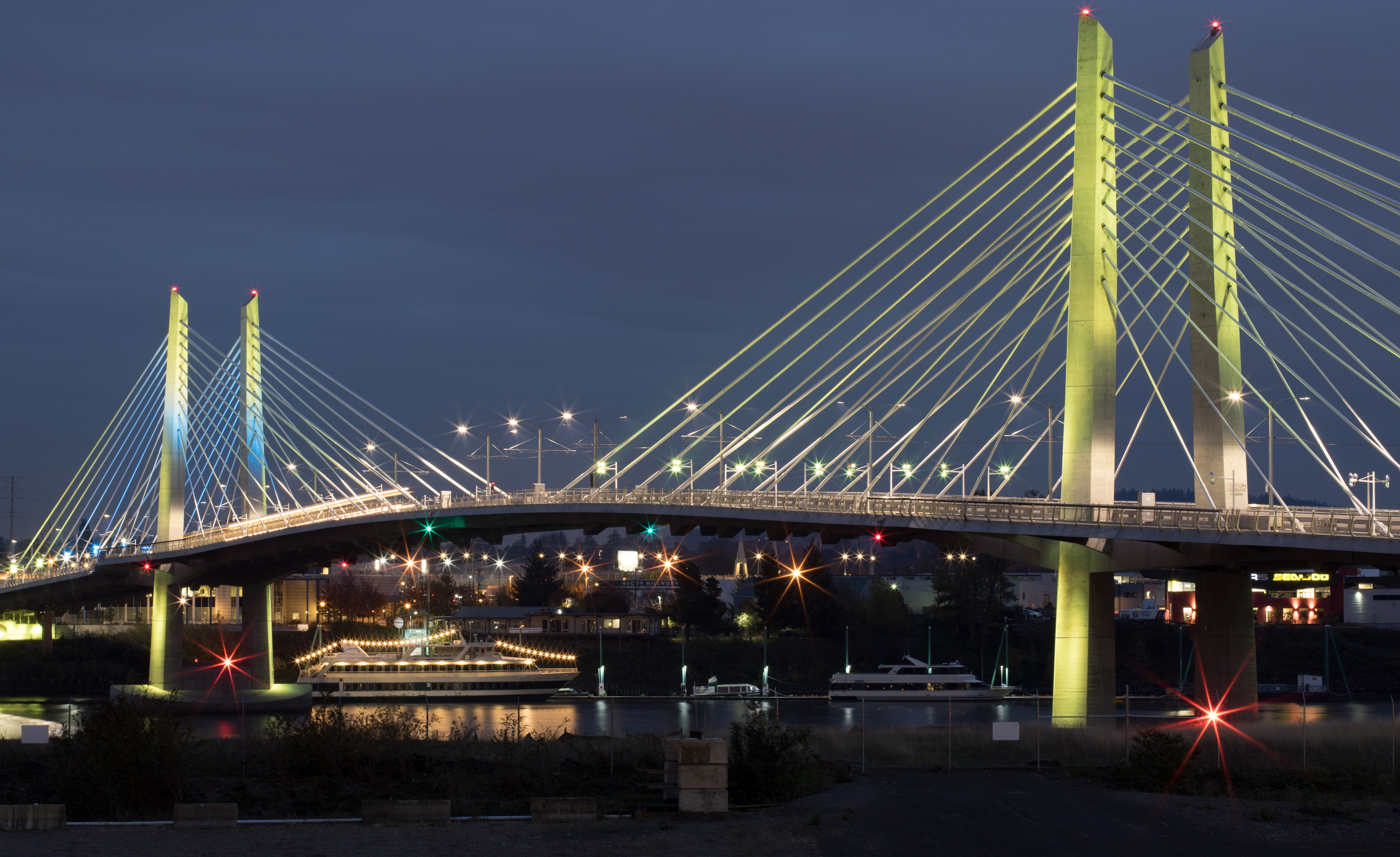
Light art system on bridge at night

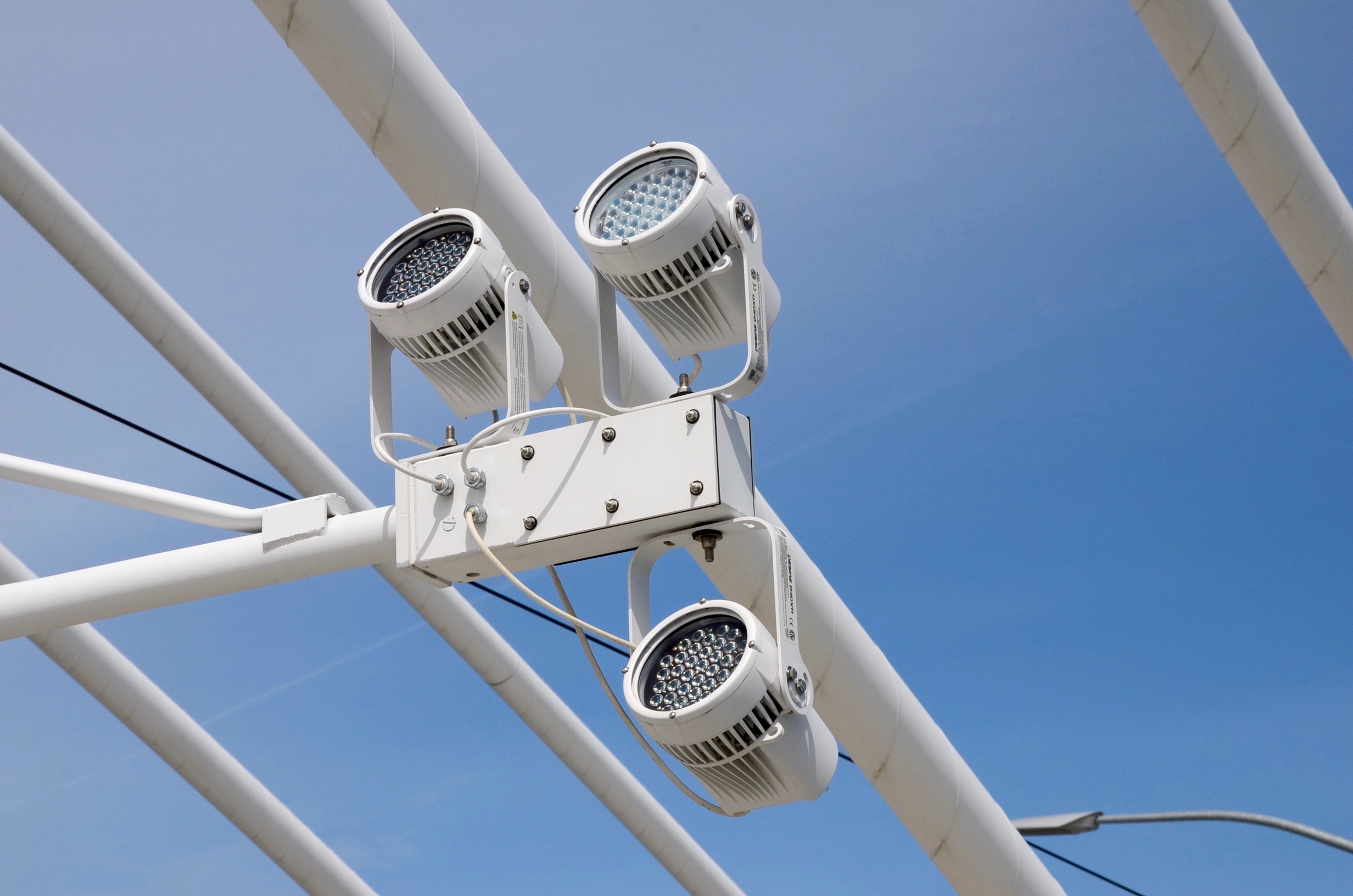
Three of the 178 LED lighting modules, each containing about 36 LEDs

A light art aesthetic lighting system, designed by installation artists Anna Valentina Murch and Doug Hollis, alters the bridge’s lighting effects based on the Willamette's speed, depth, and water temperature. It uses 178 LED modules to illuminate the cables, towers, and underside of the deck. The USGS environmental data is translated by specialized software to a processor that issues cues programmed for each of the changing conditions. The base color is determined by the water's temperature. The timing and intensity of the base color's changes, moving the light across the bridge, are determined by the river's speed. A secondary color pattern is determined by the river's depth, that changes on the two towers and the suspension cables.

== History ==
The alignment was finalized in 2008, after consideration of several alternative alignments. However, some studies and public discussion had taken place more than a decade earlier, when a MAX light rail line to Milwaukie was part of the so-called "South/North MAX" project (Vancouver–Downtown Portland–Milwaukie–Clackamas Town Center) for which voters in the Metro district approved funding in November 1994. Alternatives had included routing the proposed MAX line across the existing Hawthorne Bridge and, instead, building a new bridge on any of various alternative alignments, one of which was known as the "Caruthers Street bridge" alignment or simply "Caruthers Bridge" because its east end would roughly align with S.E. Caruthers Street. The "South/North" MAX project was ultimately mothballed after Clark County voters rejected funding their share of the project in 1995 and subsequent efforts by TriMet and Portland officials to secure funding for a scaled-back Vancouver–Portland–Milwaukie MAX line were unsuccessful. However, the planning undertaken during that period included finalizing, by 1998, the choice of a 'Caruthers' alignment for the planned new bridge. After planning for a light rail line to Milwaukie resumed, in the early 2000s, the bridge-alignment question was revisited, with a Hawthorne Bridge routing again among the options (because of its much lower cost) but with a new bridge having the widest support. In 2008, the earlier bridge routing choice was reaffirmed, except with the planned west end positioned farther south than previously, so as to better serve the then-new South Waterfront district, where major redevelopment had occurred in the several years since the "South/North" project's planning was undertaken.

=== Construction ===
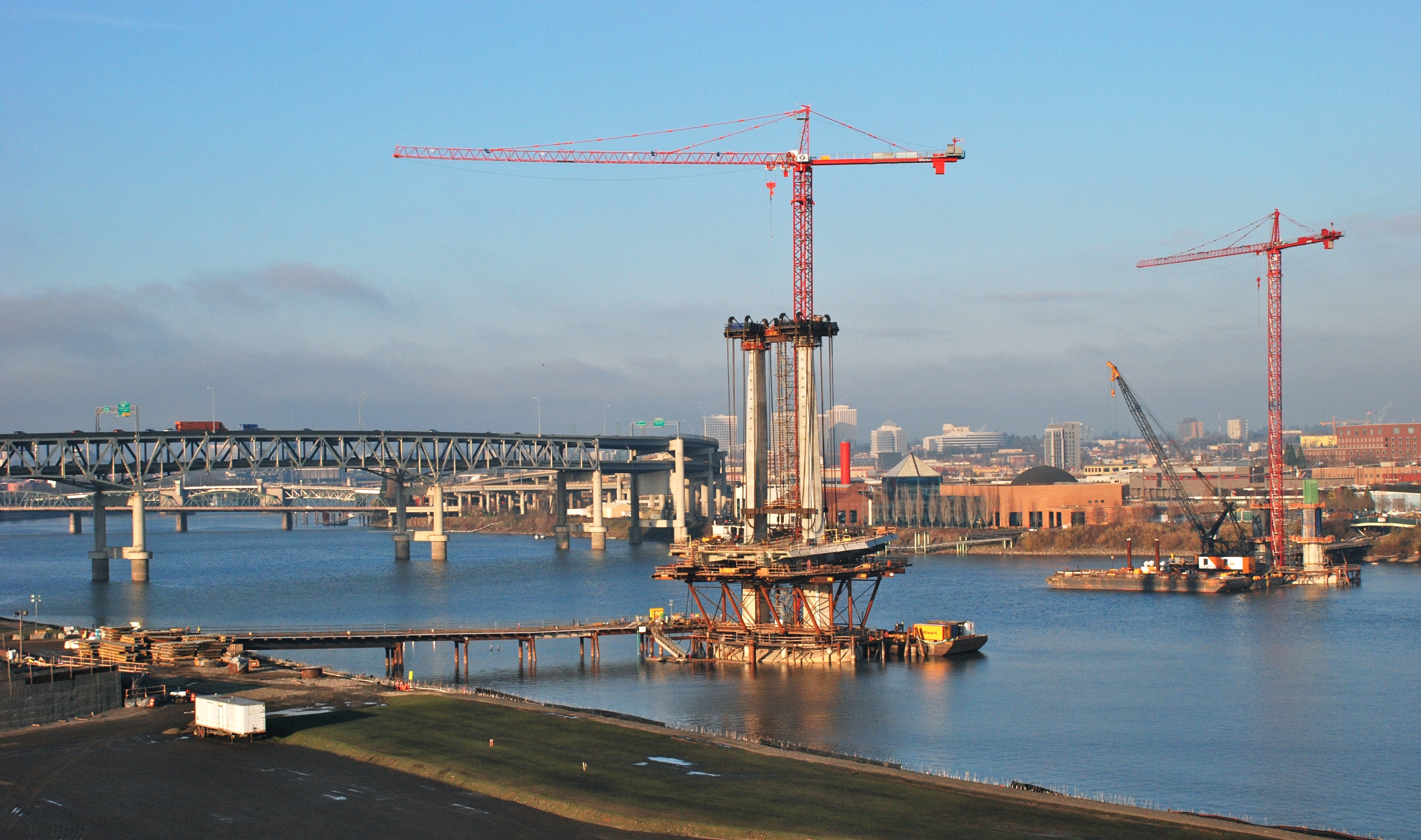
Bridge support towers under construction in January 2013

The project received required approval from both the Portland and Milwaukie city councils and Oregon's Metro regional governmental agency in 2008. TriMet approved a $127 million contract to build the bridge in December 2010. Onsite engineering of the TriMet design was handled by the HNTB Corporation with primary contracting performed by Kiewit.

Construction of the bridge was estimated to cost $134.6 million, to be paid for by federal grants, Oregon Lottery revenue and TriMet. Construction of the bridge began in June 2011, with a slow/no wake zone put in place to ensure the safety of river users and bridge construction workers. Beginning in July 2011, an exclusion area around the in-water bridge construction site went into effect. Construction of the bridge itself was scheduled for completion in 2014, followed by several months of work to install tracks and other infrastructure across the bridge.

As part of testing the signaling and overhead catenary systems, MAX and streetcar vehicles first ran across the bridge under their own power on January 21, 2015.

=== Naming ===
TriMet selected the name of the bridge in April 2014 from a list of four finalists chosen by the public. Tilikum is a Chinook Jargon word meaning people, tribe, or family, and the name is intended to honor the Multnomah, Cascade, Clackamas, and other Chinookan peoples who lived in the area as long as 14,000 years ago. The Tilikum name also references the pervasive use of Chinook Jargon in Portland’s first half century in the frequent trade interactions between pioneers and Native Americans. Before being named, the still-uncompleted bridge had usually been referred to as the Portland–Milwaukie Light Rail Bridge, or as Caruthers Crossing due to its proximity to Caruthers Street.

After the public was invited to suggest names for the bridge in the summer of 2013, the favorite choice of participants was, by an overwhelming margin, street musician Kirk Reeves. However, TriMet rejected the nomination of the recently deceased performer, and in January 2014, it chose four other, less popular finalists:

- Abigail Scott Duniway Transit Bridge: honoring the Oregon pioneer suffragist
- Cascadia Crossing Transit Bridge: in reflection of the bridge's location
- Tillicum Crossing Transit Bridge, Bridge of the People: honoring the indigenous Chinook people; "Tillicum" or "Tilikum" means people, tribe, and relatives in Chinook Jargon
- Wy'east Transit Bridge: Wy'east is the original name of Mount Hood

Public commentary on the names was accepted until March 1 and TriMet chose the final name, Tilikum Crossing, Bridge of the People in April, using the spelling preferred by the Chinookan peoples.

=== Inauguration ===
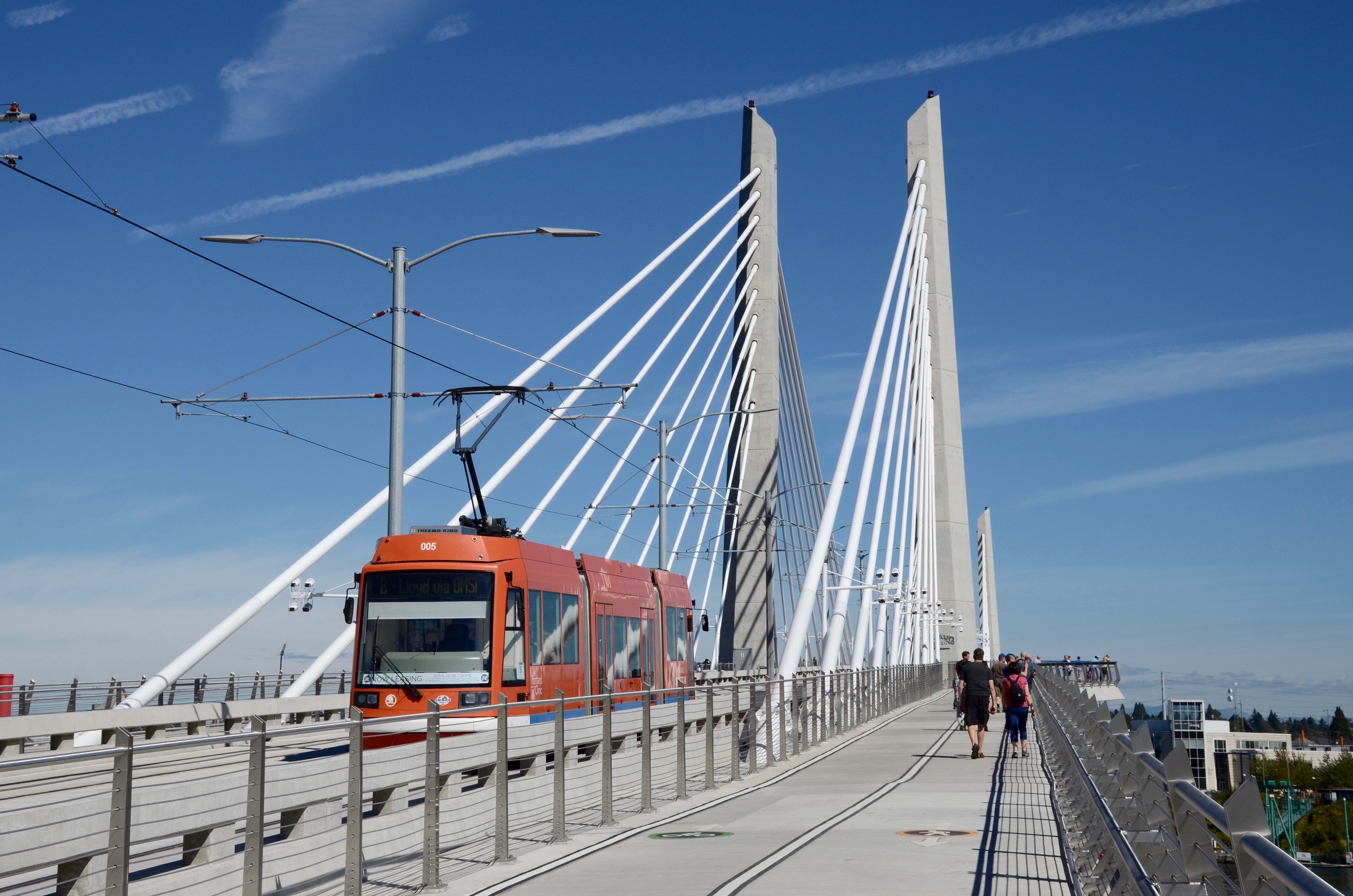
Although the bridge is owned by TriMet, the city-owned Portland Streetcar system is also allowed to use it.

The crossing opened for general use on September 12, 2015, becoming the first new bridge built across the river in the Portland metropolitan area since 1973. The first public access to the bridge was given on August 9, 2015, in the morning for the 20th annual Providence Bridge Pedal and in the afternoon with a three-hour period in which the bridge was open to everyone.

=== Later developments ===
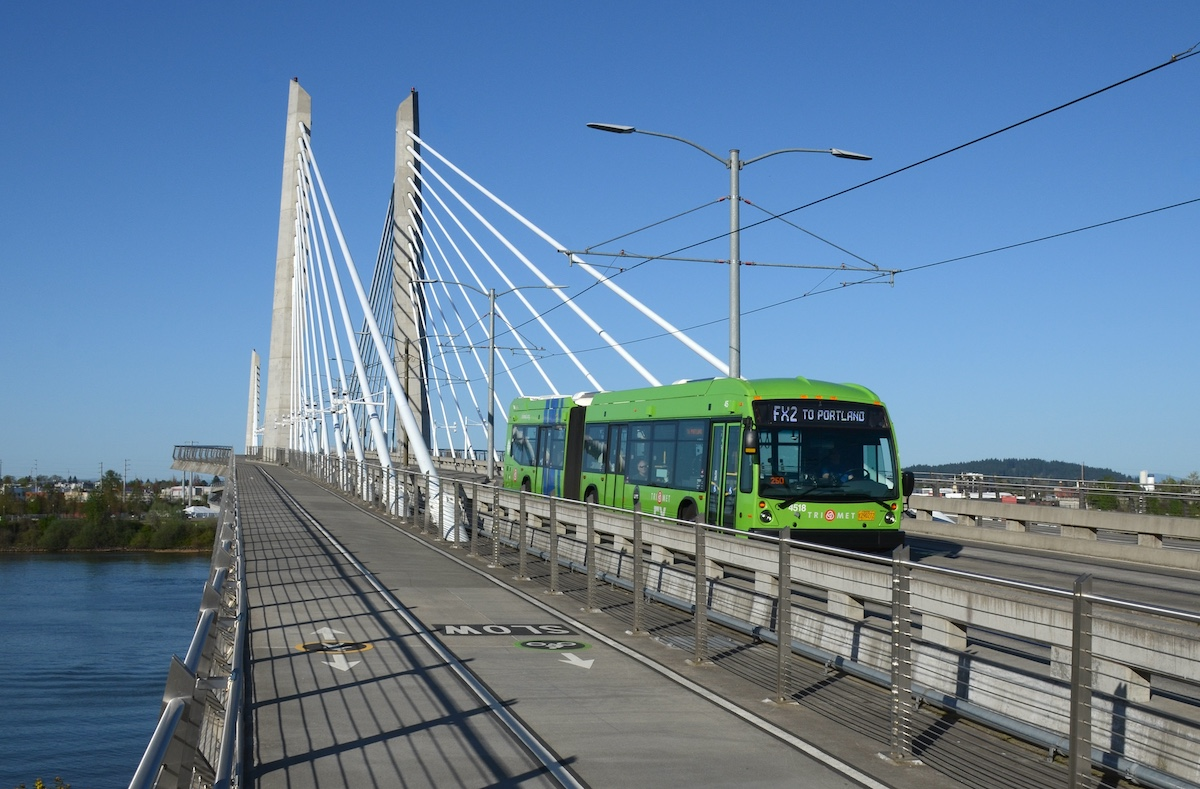
An articulated bus of the Frequent Express route FX2 on the bridge in 2023

In 2019, TriMet installed 12 vertical-axis wind turbines on the bridge, atop already existing lighting and overhead catenary poles near both ends of the bridge. It was estimated that each turbine may generate up to 1,000 watts of electricity per hour, depending on the wind speed. They began operating in May 2019. In addition to their practical use in generating power, the turbines were described by the agency as supportive of the bridge's overall "sustainability" theme and "fun to look at", and were described by the Portland Tribune as "whimsical".

TriMet's first Frequent Express route, FX2–Division, which uses articulated buses, began using the Tilikum Crossing from the route's opening in September 2022. In August 2023, a fourth bus line began using the bridge, when TriMet route 19–Woodstock was moved to the Tilikum Crossing from the Ross Island Bridge. Line 19-Woodstock was renumbered 4 in August 2026, when the bus line with which it is through-routed in downtown was changed from line 19-Glisan to line 4-Fessenden.

== See also ==
- Gibbs Street Pedestrian Bridge – opened in 2012 and located 0.37 miles (600 m) south of Tilikum Crossing
- We Have Always Lived Here, public art installed at both ends of the bridge
