= Fremont Bridge (Portland, Oregon) =

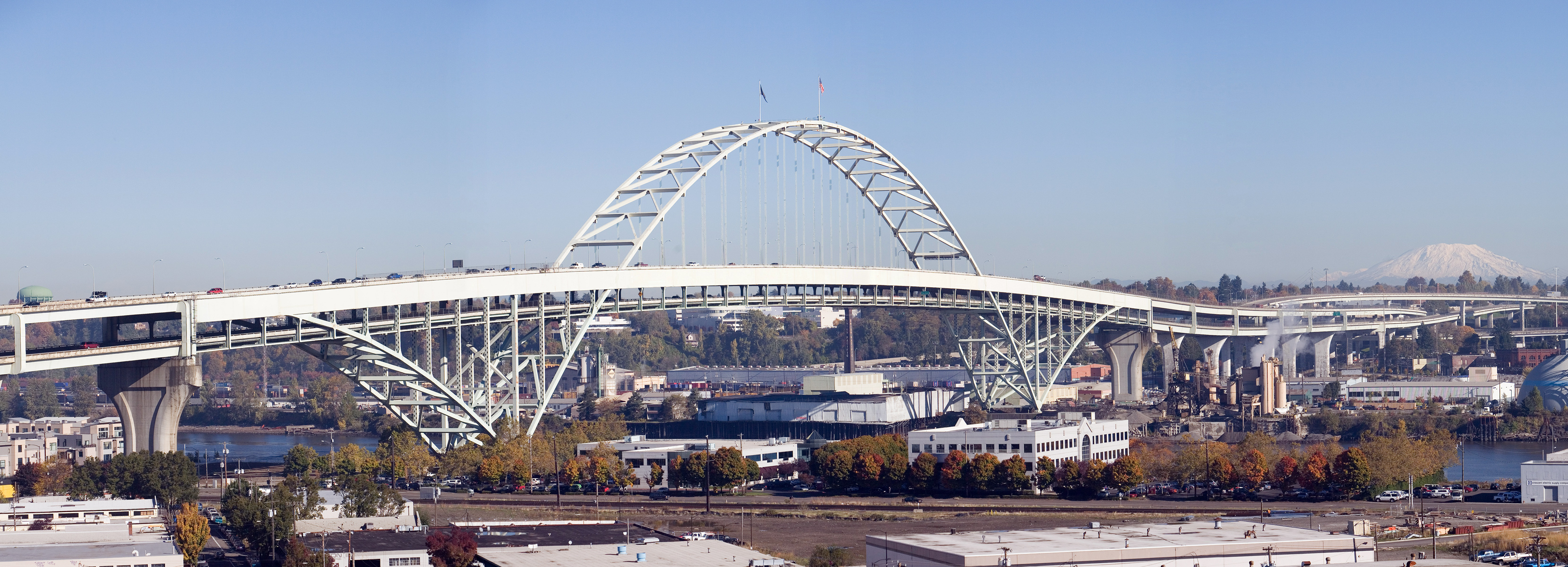
- Coordinates: 45.5377083°N 122.6825027°W
- Carries: Four lanes, two decks I-405 / US 30
- Crosses: Willamette River and surface streets
- Locale: Portland, Oregon
- Official name: Fremont Bridge
- Maintained by: Oregon Department of Transportation
- ID number: 02529

Characteristics
- Design: Tied-arch bridge
- Total length: 2,154 feet (657 m)
- Height: 381 feet (116 m)
- Longest span: 1,255 feet (383 m) longest in Oregon
- Clearance above: 18.3 feet (5.6 m)
- Clearance below: 175 feet (53 m)

History
- Opened: November 15, 1973

Location
- Interactive map of Fremont Bridge

The Fremont Bridge is a steel tied-arch bridge over the Willamette River located in Portland, Oregon, United States. It carries Interstate 405 and US 30 traffic between downtown and North Portland where it intersects with Interstate 5. It has the longest main span of any bridge in Oregon and is the second longest tied-arch bridge in the world (after Caiyuanba Bridge across the Yangtze River, China). The bridge was designed by Parsons, Brinckerhoff, Quade and Douglas, and built by Murphy Pacific Corporation.

The bridge has two decks carrying vehicular traffic, each with four lanes. The upper deck is signed westbound on US 30 and southbound on I-405. The lower deck is signed eastbound on US 30 and northbound on I-405.

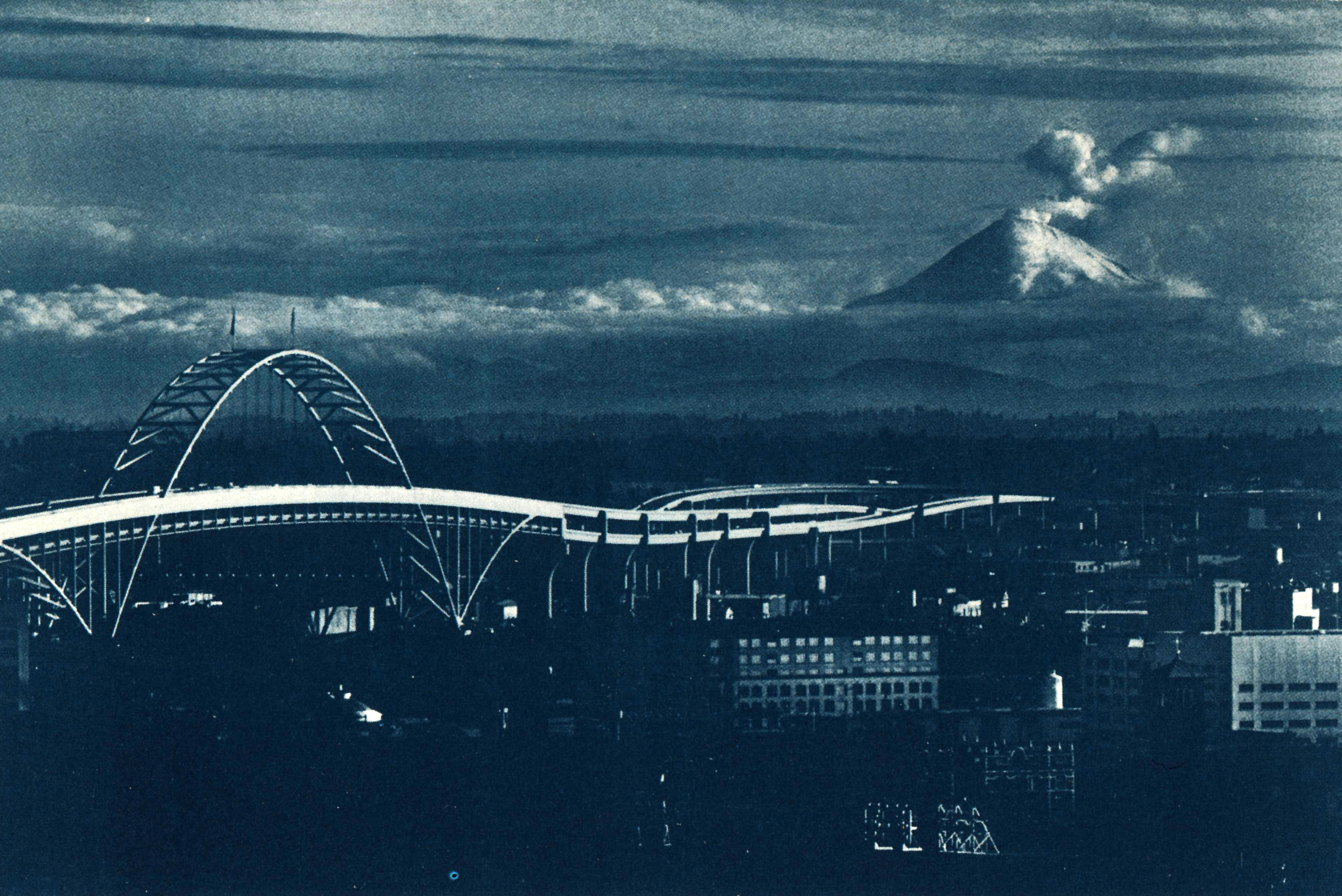
Mount St. Helens erupting on May 18, 1980, with the Fremont Bridge on the left.

== Design and construction ==
Due to the public's dissatisfaction with the appearance of the Marquam Bridge opened in 1966, the Portland Art Commission was invited to participate in the design process of the Fremont. The improvement in visual quality resulted in a bridge that was nearly six times as expensive as the purposely economical Marquam Bridge. Designers modeled the bridge after the original 1964 Port Mann Bridge in Vancouver, British Columbia.

The steel tie-girder (I-beam) is 18 feet (5.5 m) tall and 50 inches (130 cm) wide. On October 28, 1971, while still under construction, a six-foot-long (1.8 m) crack was found on the west span of this girder that required a $5.5 million redesign and repair. The ramps and approaches are steel box girders. If the lanes of the bridge were placed end-to-end, there are 3.27 lane-miles (5.26 lane-km) on the arch bridge and 14.12 lane-miles (22.72 lane-km) on the ramps and approaches.

The center span of the bridge, where the rib of the arch is above the deck, is 902 feet (275 m) long. It was fabricated in California then assembled at Swan Island Industrial Park, 1.7 miles (2.7 km) downstream. After assembly it was floated on a barge the 1.7-mile (2.7 km) trip to the construction site. On March 16, 1973, the 6,000 short tons (5,400 t) steel arch span was lifted 170 ft (52 m) using 32 hydraulic jacks. At the time, it was listed in the Guinness Book of World Records as the heaviest lift ever completed.

The bridge was opened on November 15, 1973, at a final cost of $82 million (equivalent to $652 million in 2025), most of which was financed by the Federal Highway Administration. In 1976, an American flag and an Oregon flag were added atop the structure as part of the bicentennial celebration for the United States. The flags were installed with the use of a helicopter. The 15-by-25-foot (4.6 m × 7.6 m) flags are attached to 50-foot (15 m) tall flagpoles at the crest of the arches.

== Falcon nest ==
The Fremont Bridge was also the 26th Peregrine falcon nest site designated in Oregon in 1995 after the raptor was placed on the U.S. Threatened and Endangered Species list in 1970.

The falcon has since been removed from the list and is now listed as least concern.

== Etymology ==
The bridge as well as Portland's associated Fremont Street were named for John C. Frémont (1813–1890), an early explorer of Las Californias and the Oregon Country. He served in the United States Army at the time as a Captain and was later promoted to General. In 1856, he ran for president, but was defeated by James Buchanan.

== Gallery ==
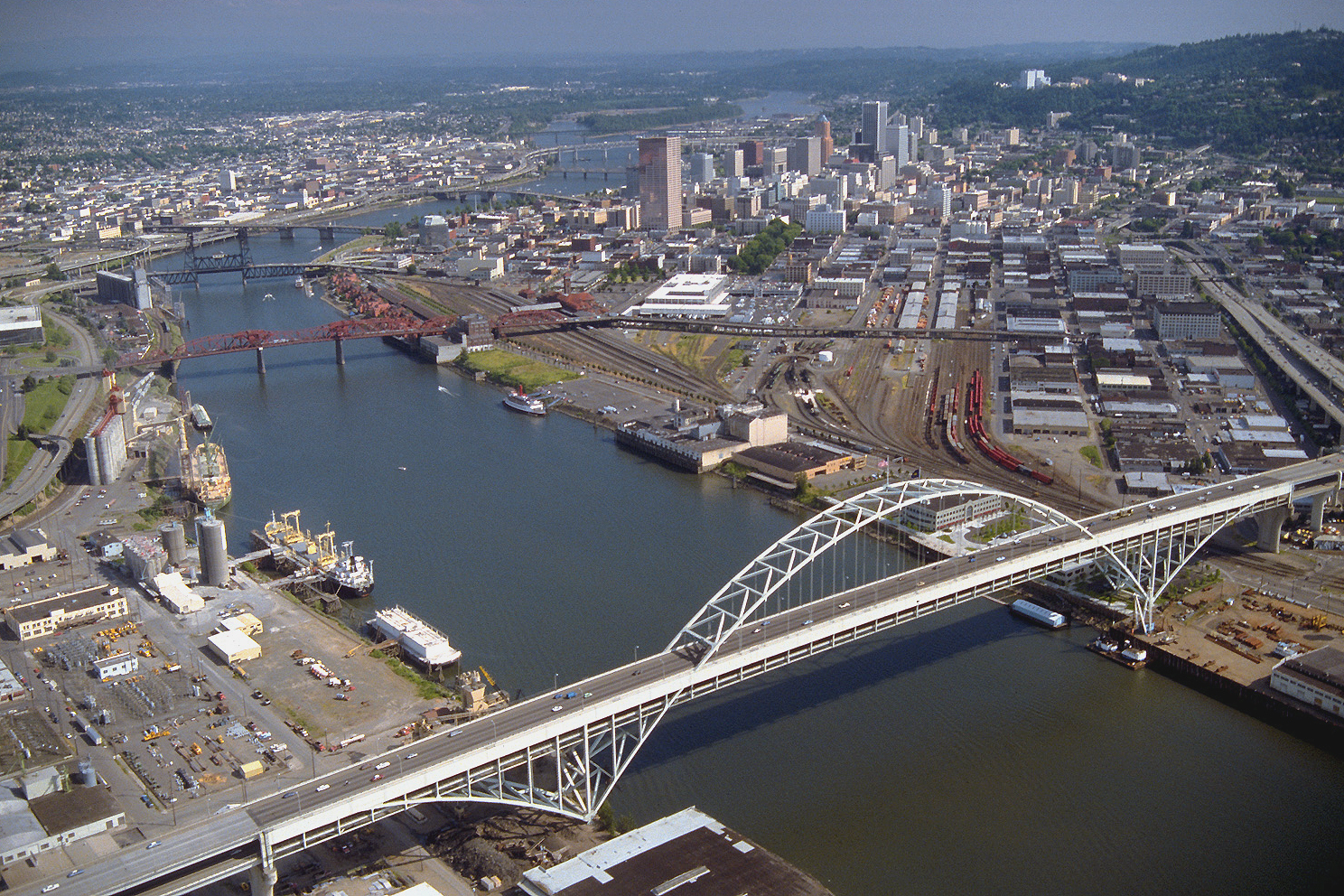
Fremont Bridge and the skyline of Portland c. 1988

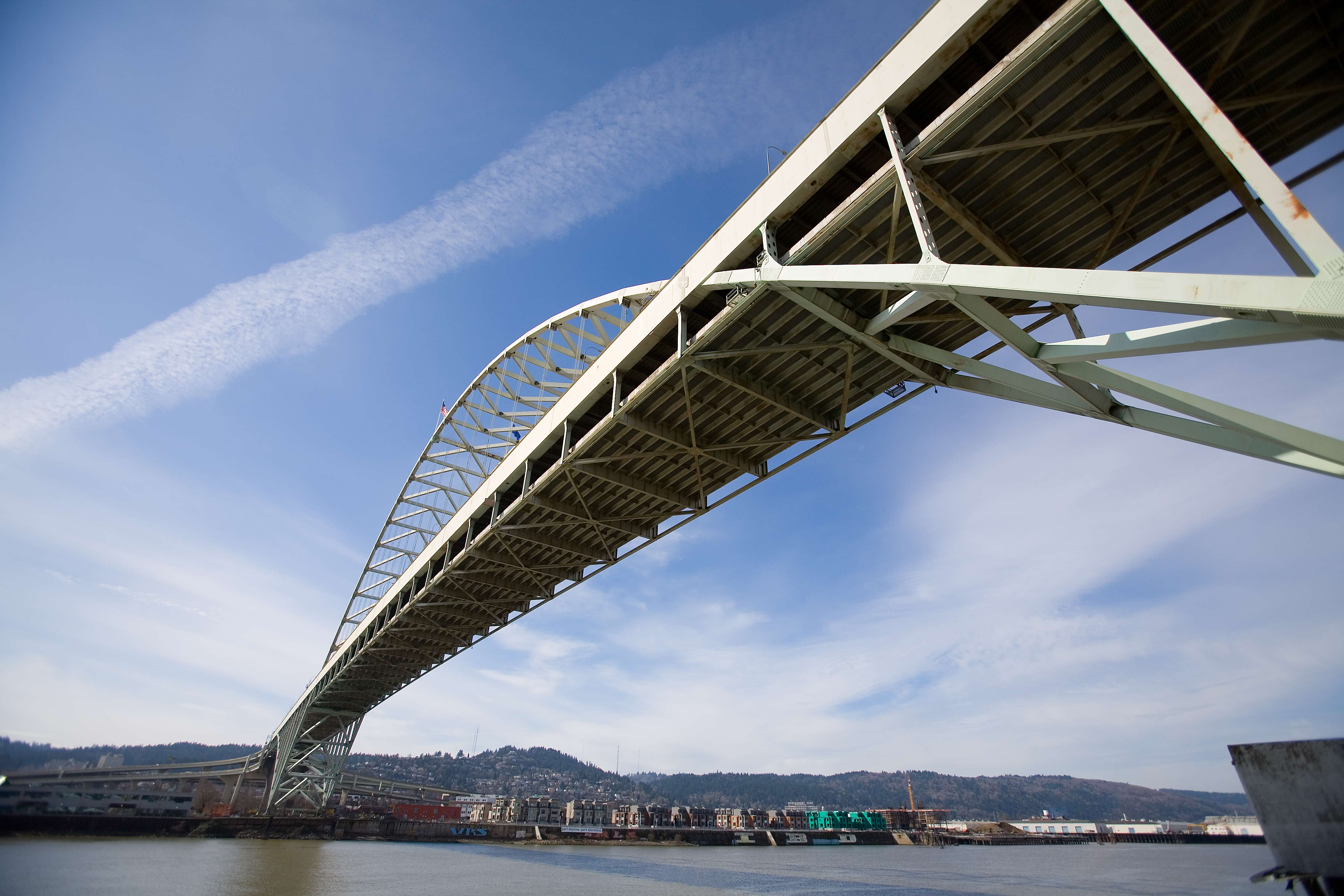
From the east end

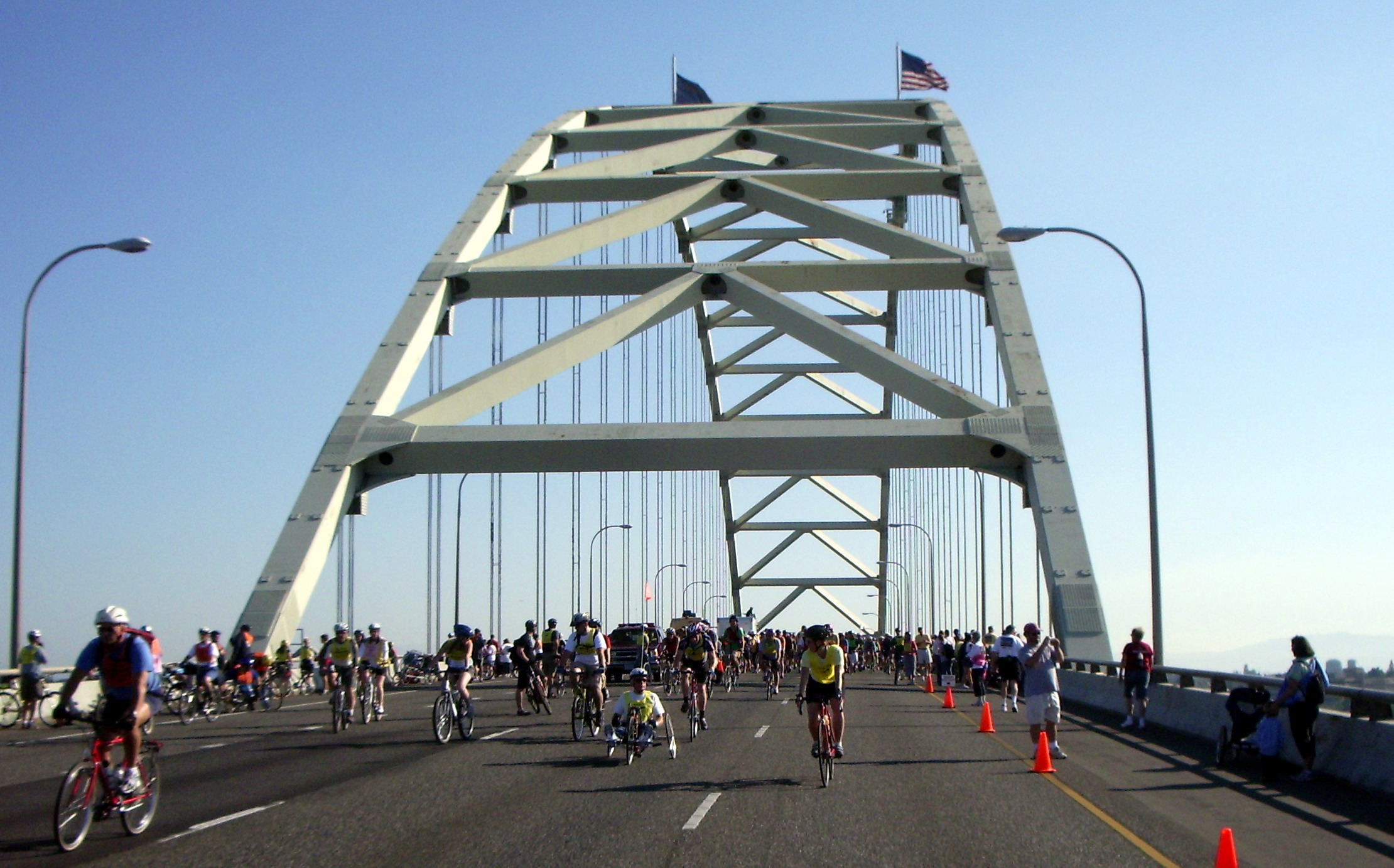
Annual Bridge Pedal on the top deck of the Fremont Bridge

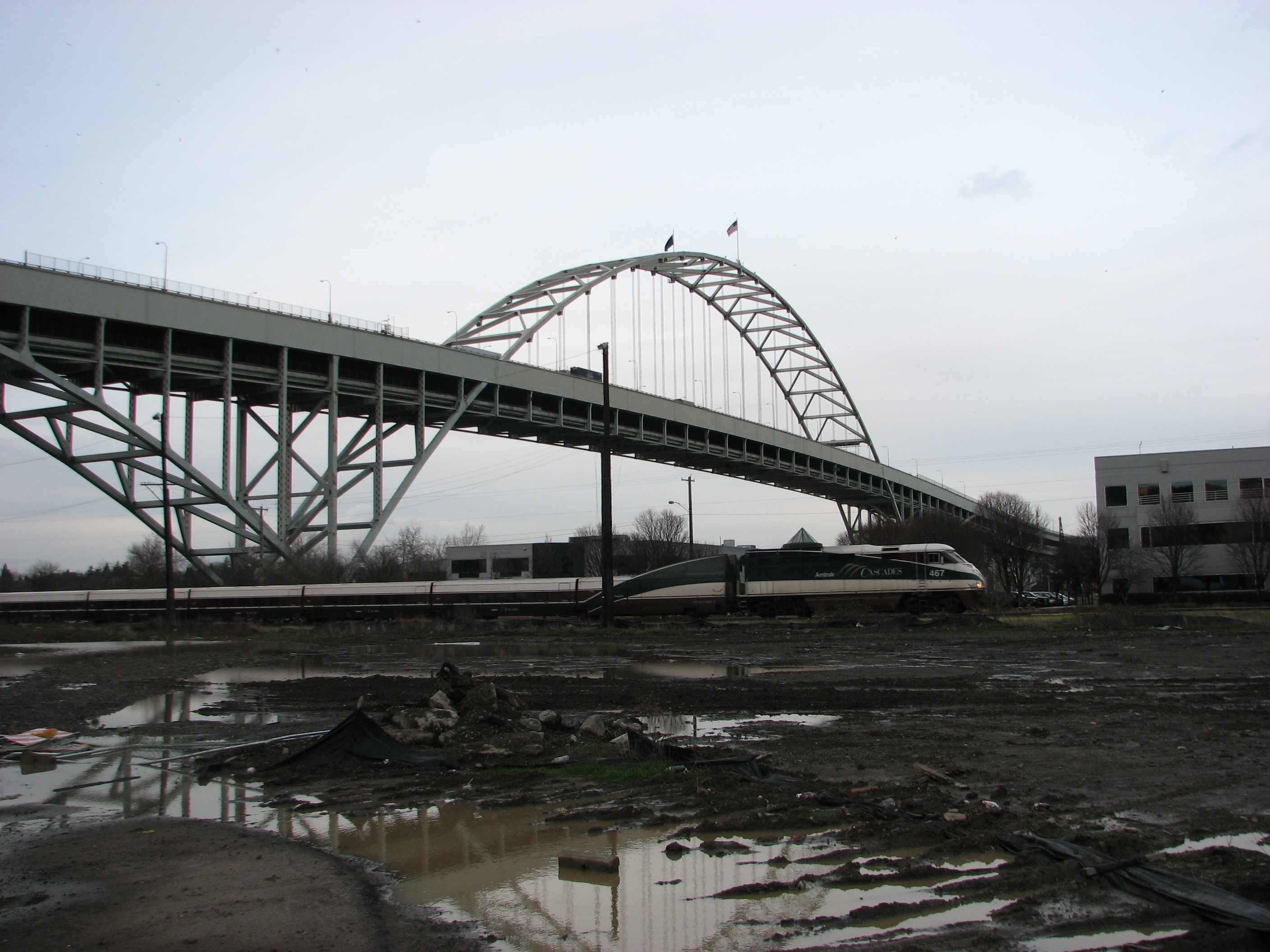
An Amtrak train passing beneath the Fremont Bridge

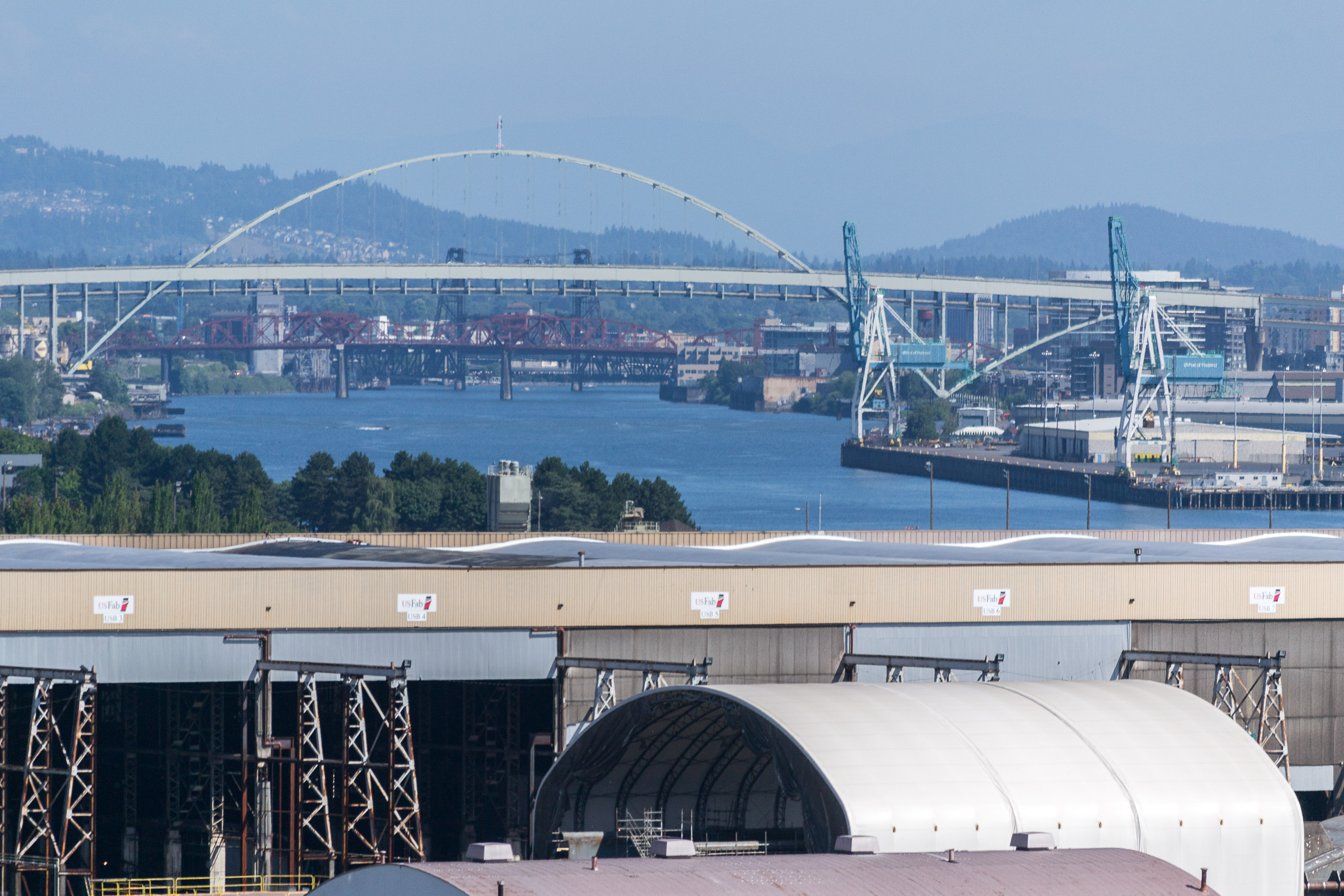
The Fremont Bridge from the University of Portland

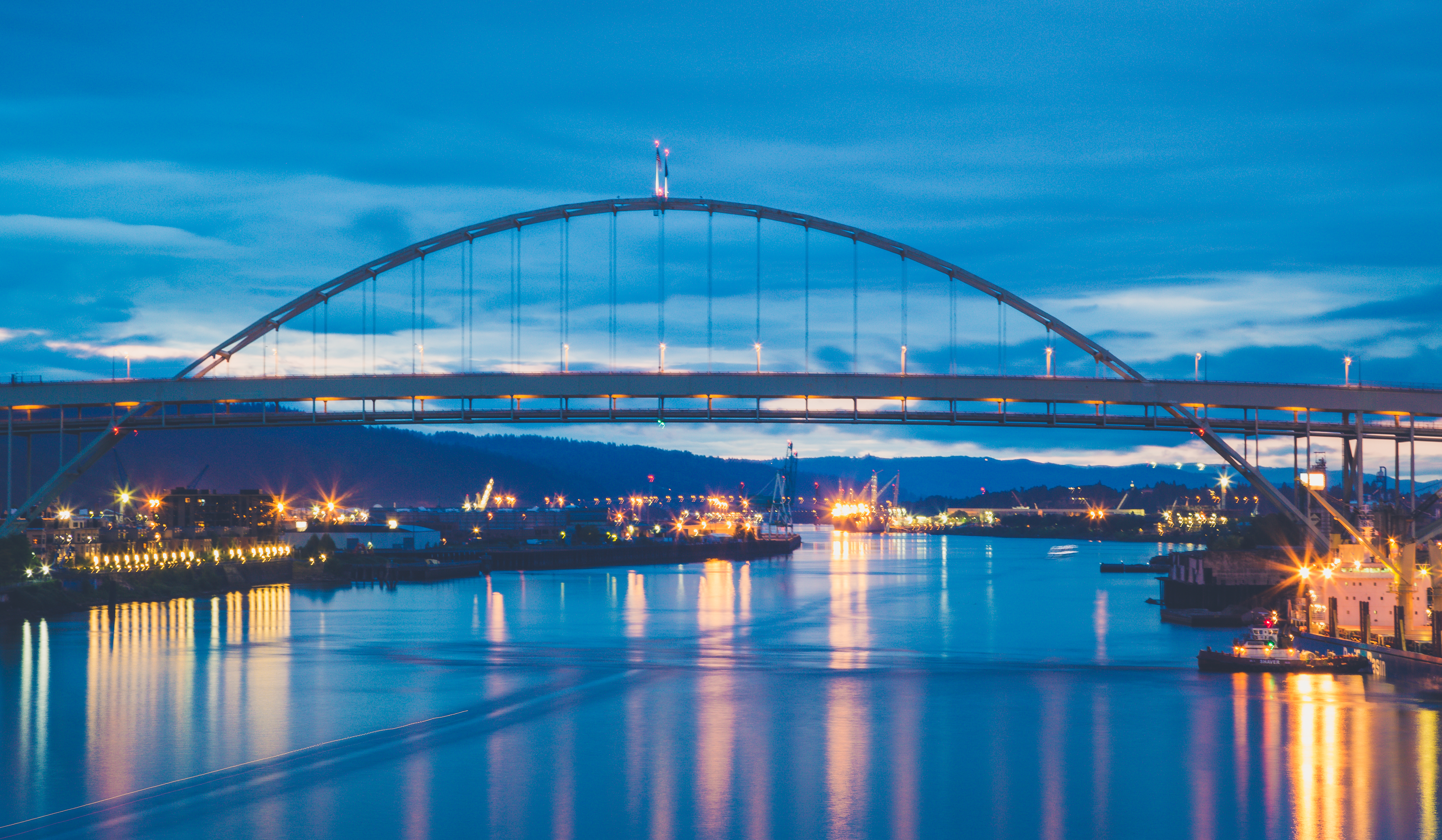
Looking west at the Fremont Bridge during sunset

== See also ==
- List of bridges documented by the Historic American Engineering Record in Oregon
- List of crossings of the Willamette River
