= Providence Bridge Pedal =

Bicycle road ride event for Portland, Oregon

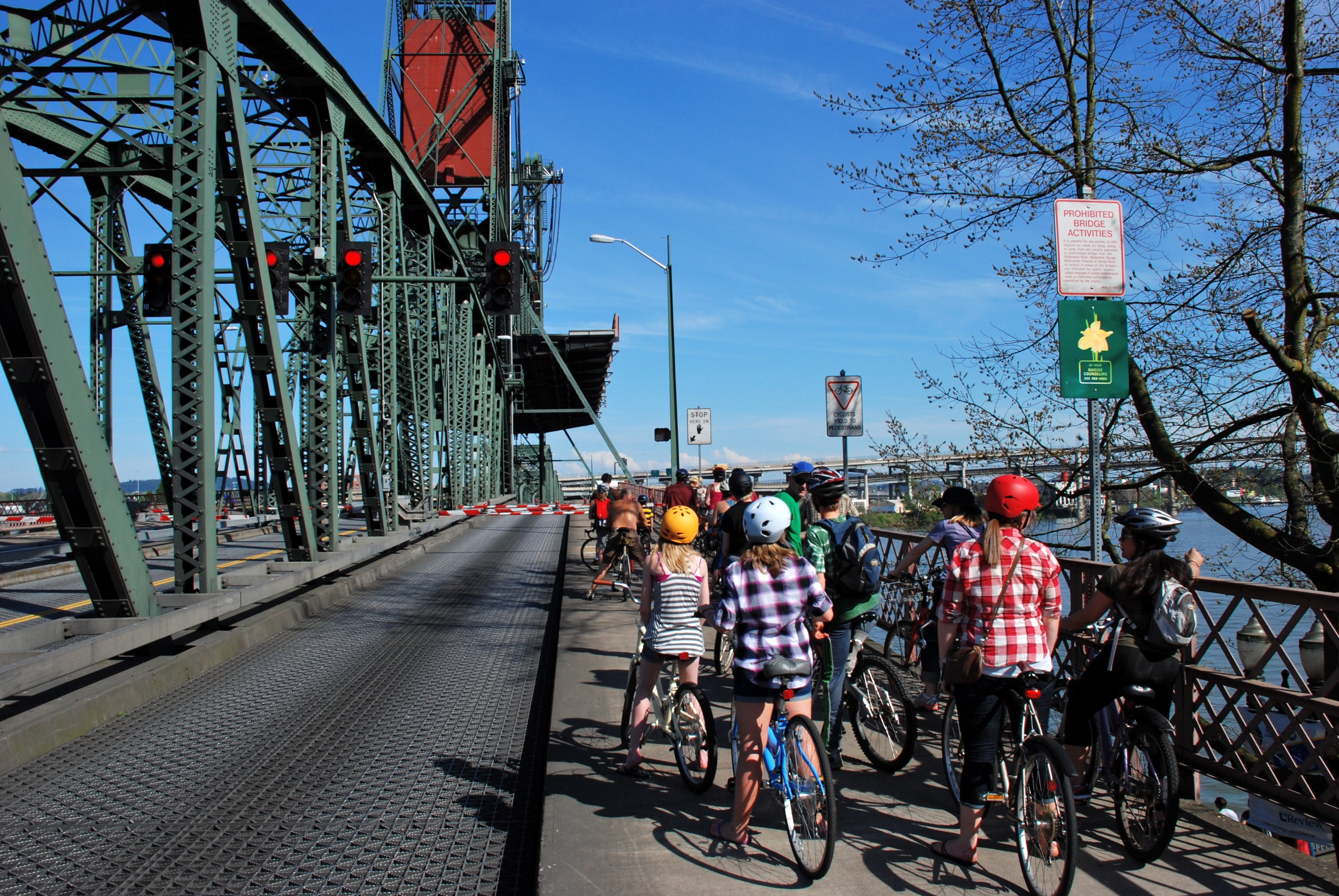
The Providence Bridge Pedal occurs on as many as 10 Willamette River crossings in Portland, Oregon.

The Providence Bridge Pedal, formerly known as the Portland Bridge Pedal is an annual recreational cycling and walking event across several Willamette River crossings in Portland, Oregon. Oregon State Representative Rick Bauman is credited with conceiving the event while watching the 1980 eruption of Mount St. Helens on the Marquam Bridge. By 2007 it became the world's third largest annual recreational cycling event behind the Five Boro Bike Tour in New York City, New York and Tour de l'Île in Montreal, Quebec.

The first event was held in 1996 and attracted 7,500 cyclists and walkers. The name was changed from the Portland Bridge Pedal to the Providence Bridge Pedal in 1997 after Providence Health and Services became the event's main sponsor. There are several routes with varying lengths in the event, which averages 20,000 participants per year. The longest route in 2013 spanned 10 crossings. The 2015 event was also the public preview of Tilikum Crossing, the first major bridge in the U.S. that was designed to allow access to transit vehicles, cyclists and pedestrians but not cars, with an estimated 40,000–50,000 people crossing the bridge during the day.
