= We Have Always Lived Here =

2015 public artwork in Portland, Oregon, U.S.

- One of the basalt carvings and the bronze medallion installed on the east end of the bridge (2020)
- Artist: Greg A. Robinson
- Year: 2015
- Medium: Basalt; bronze
- Location: Portland, Oregon, United States; 45.5049°N 122.6670°W

We Have Always Lived Here is a 2015 public art installation by Greg A. Robinson, installed at Tilikum Crossing in Portland, Oregon, in the United States. The work consists of two traditional Chinook basalt carvings sited at both ends of the bridge, plus a bronze medallion on the northeast side of the bridge.

== Description ==
We Have Always Lived Here is the collective title of Greg A. Robinson's three-part public art installation, displayed at both ends of Tilikum Crossing, which connects the city's South Portland and Hosford-Abernethy neighborhoods on the west and east sides of the Willamette River, respectively. Robinson is a Chinook artist of the Confederated Tribes of the Grand Ronde Community of Oregon. The work consists of two 6-foot (1.8 m) basalt carvings (one on each end of the bridge) and a bronze medallion with a 5-foot (1.5 m) diameter, installed on the northeast side of the bridge.

The carvings depict a "tayi", or headman, and faces "representing the Chinookan people of the past and future". The medallion depicts coyotes, humans, and Morning Star with her children. According to KOIN, basalt carvings are a tradition among the Chinookan peoples. Robinson has said that the installation is "meant to be a testament to the survival of Chinukian people along the Columbia and Willamette rivers and the ongoing cultural activities that happen here constantly. I'm very happy it's going to be here and be visible by the Portland people as well."

== History ==
The public art was presented to TriMet on April 17, 2015, at ceremony held near the bridge's juncture of the Eastside Greenway. It was attended by mayor Charlie Hales and other local dignitaries, council members from the Grand Ronde, and TriMet's general manager Neil McFarlane. Tribal member Cheryle Kennedy said at the event, "Today we honor our ancestors with this gift. Today this opportunity provides what we hope is the beginning of the recognition of the traditional art form of our ancestors." Robinson also spoke at the ceremony. He said the medallion "was an effort to pay tribute to both this world, the world of Earth, and the parallel world of the sky above." Furthermore, he closed his speech by saying, "It's much less about me having my art here as it is about having a permanent testament to the survival and ongoing culture of the Chinookan people that still live here in the Portland Vancouver area."

Tilikum Crossing opened to the public as part of the MAX Orange Line in September 2015.

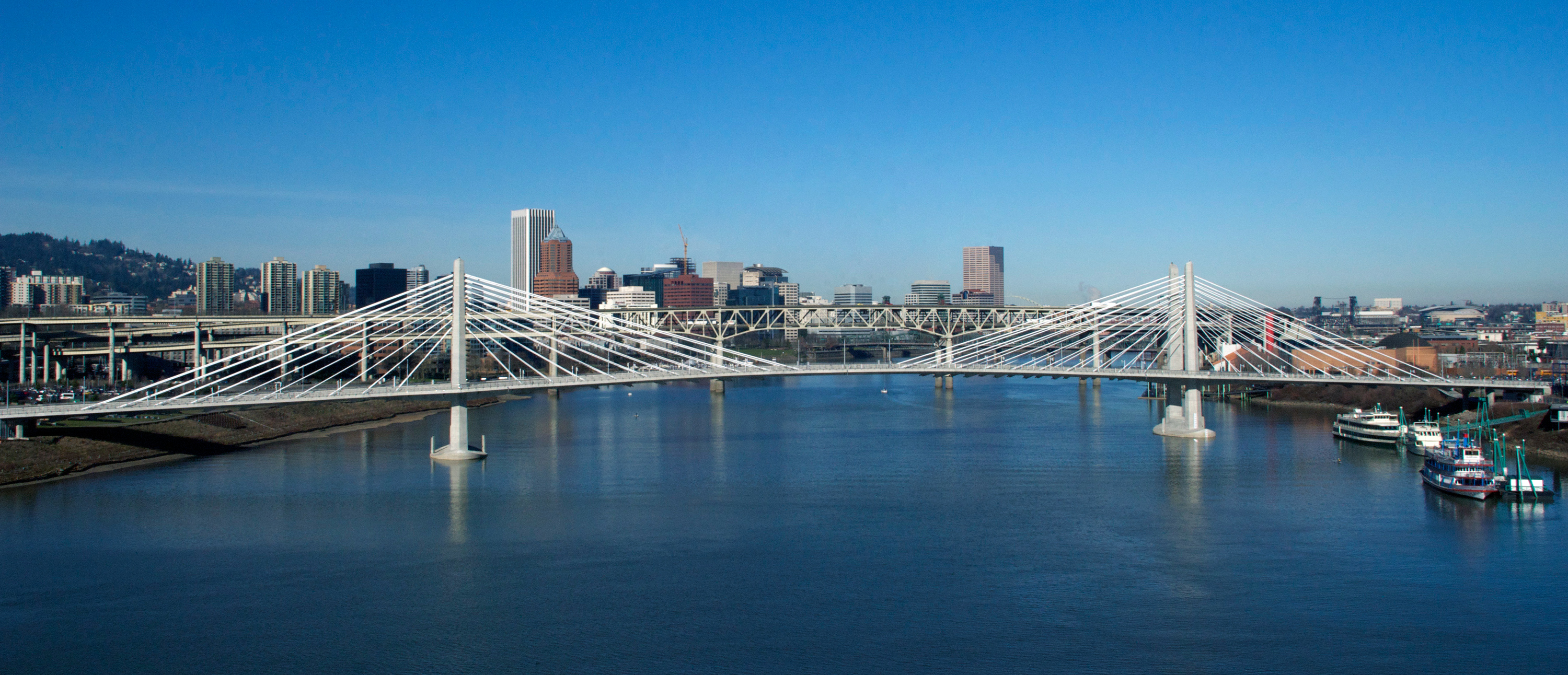
The public artwork is installed at both ends of Tilikum Crossing (2015)

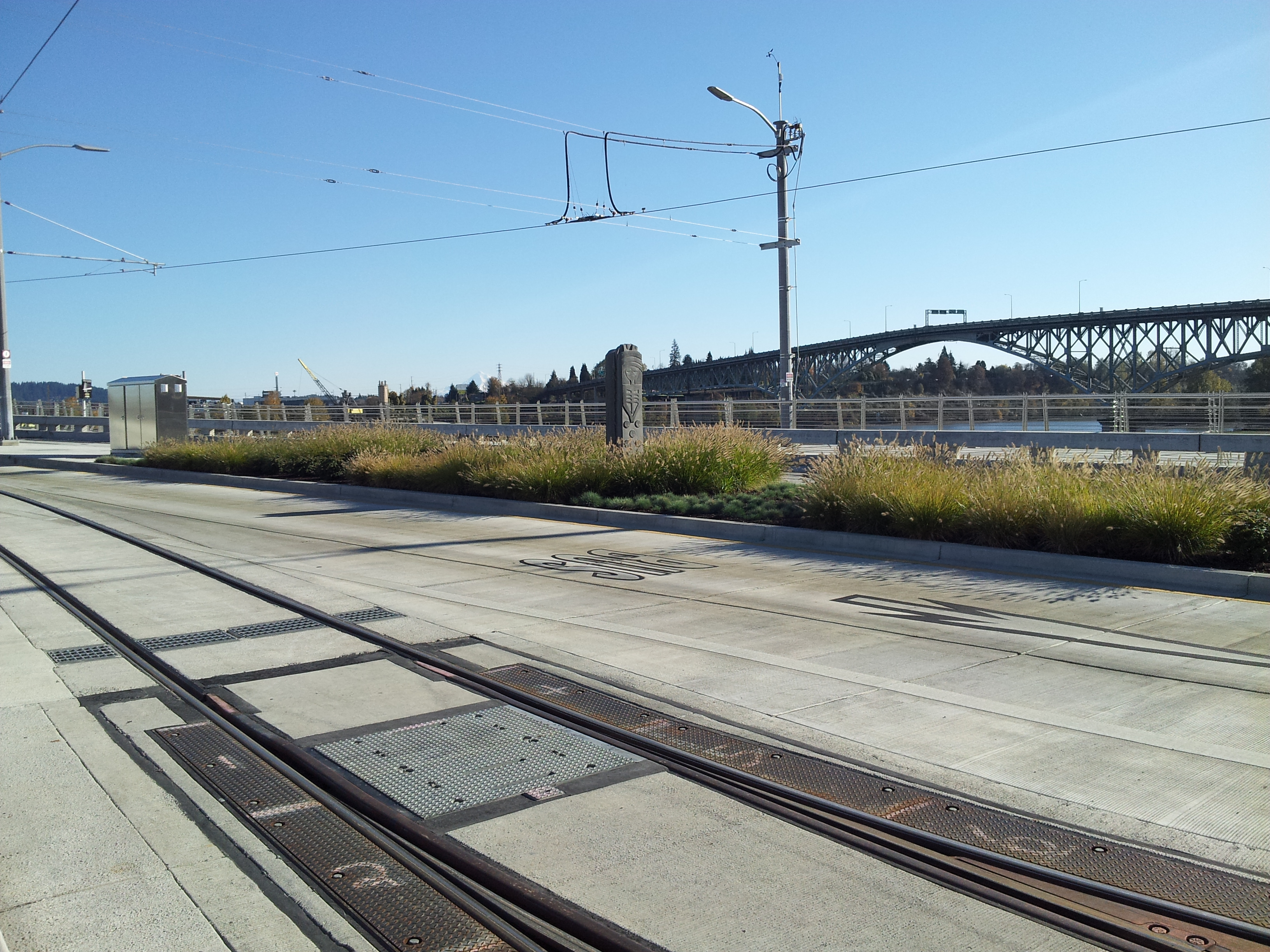
Basalt carving on the west end of the bridge, 2015

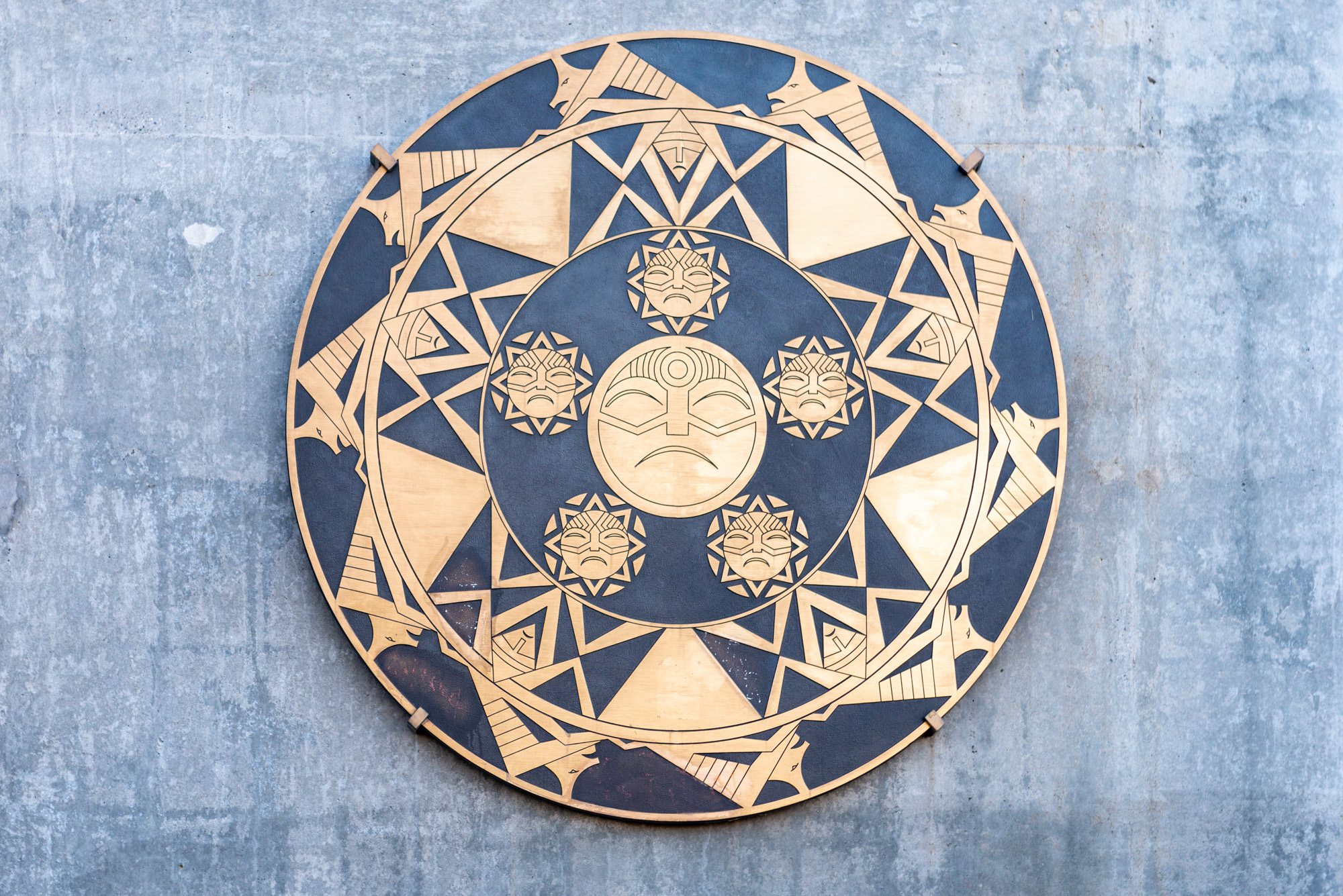

== See also ==
- 2015 in art
- Coyote (mythology)
- Coyotes in popular culture
