= Kirk Reeves =

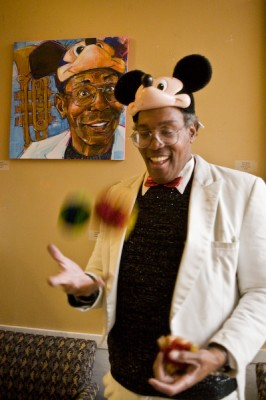
- Reeves in 2010

Background information
- Born: Kirk Reeves; 1956; Boston, Massachusetts, United States
- Died: November 3-4 2012 Portland, Oregon, United States
- Genres: Jazz, classical
- Occupations: Street musician, cable-access TV host, entertainer, magician
- Instrument: trumpet
- Years active: 2001 – 2012
- Website: Kirk Reeves, In Memoriam

Kirk Reeves (1956-2012), also known as 'Working' Kirk Reeves, was an American street musician and entertainer best known for playing the trumpet at the west bank bridgehead of the Hawthorne Bridge in Portland, Oregon, while wearing a Mickey Mouse hat and a white suit.

== Life and years as an entertainer ==
Reeves was born in Boston, Massachusetts, and later spent time "hanging around" a computer club at the Massachusetts Institute of Technology. This led to a job in Oregon's computing industry, which he later left due to concerns that the Y2K bug would put him out of work.

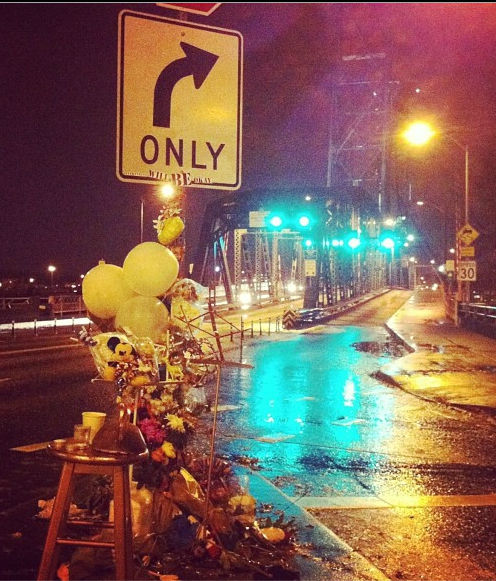
A small memorial for Reeves on the eastbound ramp to the Hawthorne Bridge, November 2012

He decided to pursue a career as an entertainer, purchased a trumpet at a garage sale, and started taking lessons. In the early 2000s, Reeves became a common sight on the streets of downtown Portland, often performing across from Powell's City of Books. Reeves spent many of the subsequent years homeless and bore a scar along his neck from a violent attack.

He also suffered from diabetes, cataracts, and depression. Despite these ailments, he entertained thousands of Portland-area motorists, pedestrians, and cyclists for over a decade with his music, magic tricks, and a rolling cart filled with gadgets, puppets, and other props. Reeves eventually relocated to a semi-permanent spot at the west end of the Hawthorne Bridge, where he frequently performed in his later years. His signature tunes included "Somewhere Over the Rainbow," the title theme from the Star Wars film series and "Amazing Grace."

Reeves also wrote four unpublished novels and hosted a Portland-area cable access program called Low Comedy. In May 2012, he traveled to Los Angeles to audition for a slot on America's Got Talent and Shark Tank but wasn't selected for either program.

== Death ==
Despondent over his setbacks as an entertainer, financial troubles, and health problems, Reeves committed suicide over the weekend of November 3, 2012, in the Smith and Bybee Wetlands Natural Area in North Portland. On the night of November 18, 2012, a candlelight vigil attended by over 200 people was held for Reeves beneath the Hawthorne Bridge. Portland Mayor Sam Adams declared that Sunday "Kirk Reeves Day." A group of trumpeters played "Taps" and "Amazing Grace" as the assembly marched across the bridge.

A group called the Memorial for Kirk Reeves the Trumpet Man attempted to raise funds for constructing a Reeves statue, hoping to place it near the Hawthorne Bridge. Their efforts subsequently transitioned into an unsuccessful campaign to name a new transit bridge (ultimately named Tilikum Crossing) for him. In 2014, artist Gwenn Seemel painted a mural featuring him at NE Grand and Lloyd.
