= Marquam Bridge =

Bridge in Portland, Oregon

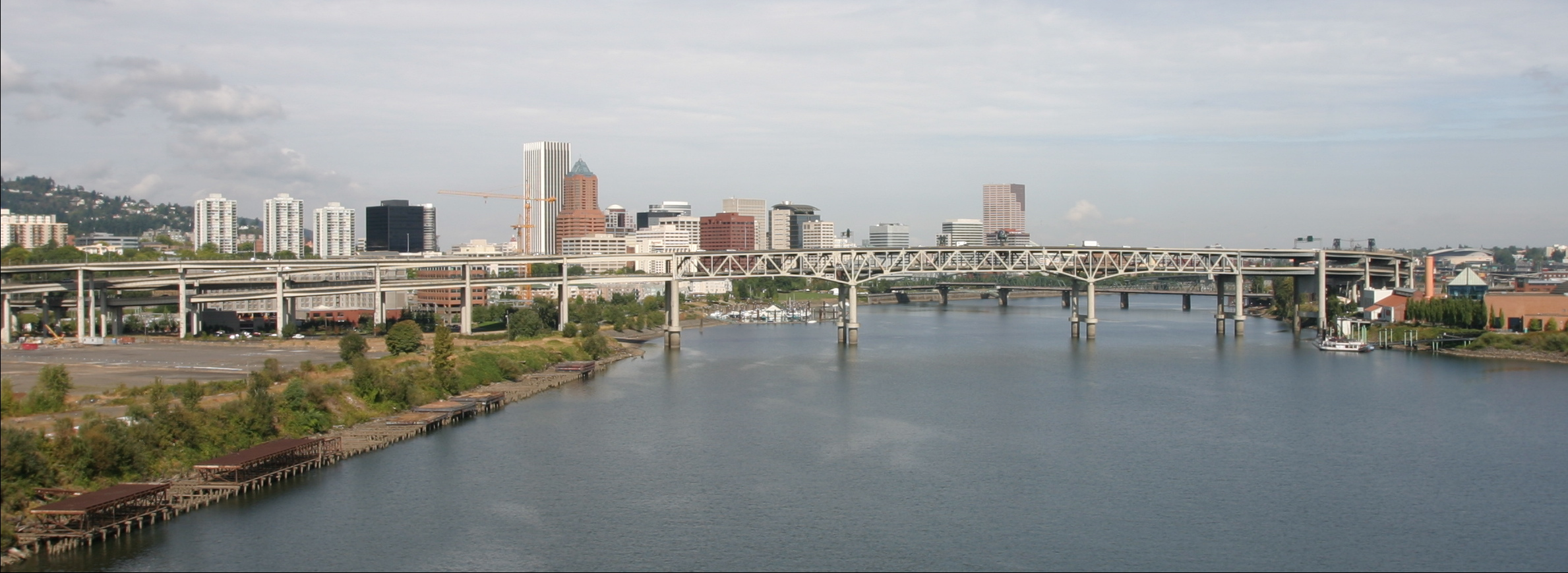
- View from the south (from Ross Island Bridge) in 2005, before the Tilikum Crossing was built
- Coordinates: 45.5079°N 122.6690°W
- Carries: I-5
- Crosses: Willamette River
- Locale: Portland, Oregon
- Maintained by: ODOT
- ID number: 08328

Characteristics
- Design: Cantilever truss
- Total length: 1,043 feet (318 m)
- Width: 57 feet (17 m)
- Longest span: 440 feet (130 m)
- Clearance above: <35 feet (11 m) northbound
- Clearance below: 130 feet (40 m)

History
- Opened: October 1966

Location
- Interactive map of Marquam Bridge

The Marquam Bridge /ˈmɑːrkəm/ is a double-deck, steel-truss cantilever bridge opened in 1966 that carries Interstate 5 traffic across the Willamette River from south of downtown Portland, Oregon, on the west side to the industrial area of inner Southeast on the east. It is the busiest bridge in Oregon, carrying 140,500 vehicles a day as of 2016. The upper deck carries northbound traffic; the lower deck carries southbound traffic. The Marquam also has on and off ramps for Interstate 405 on the south end of the bridge, while the terminus on the east bank of the river is near the interchange with Interstate 84.

== History ==
Planning for the span started in 1956 as the last link in Oregon for the new Interstate Highway System for the main north-south route through the state. Even prior to construction, it was decided to name the span after Philip Marquam. Marquam was a state legislator and Multnomah County judge, who owned much of Marquam Hill where Oregon Health & Science University and the Veterans Affairs Medical Center now stand. Construction on the bridge's support piers began in January 1962. Construction on the bridge finished on February 28, 1966. The lower southbound deck was opened on October 4, 1966, and the upper northbound deck on October 18, 1966.

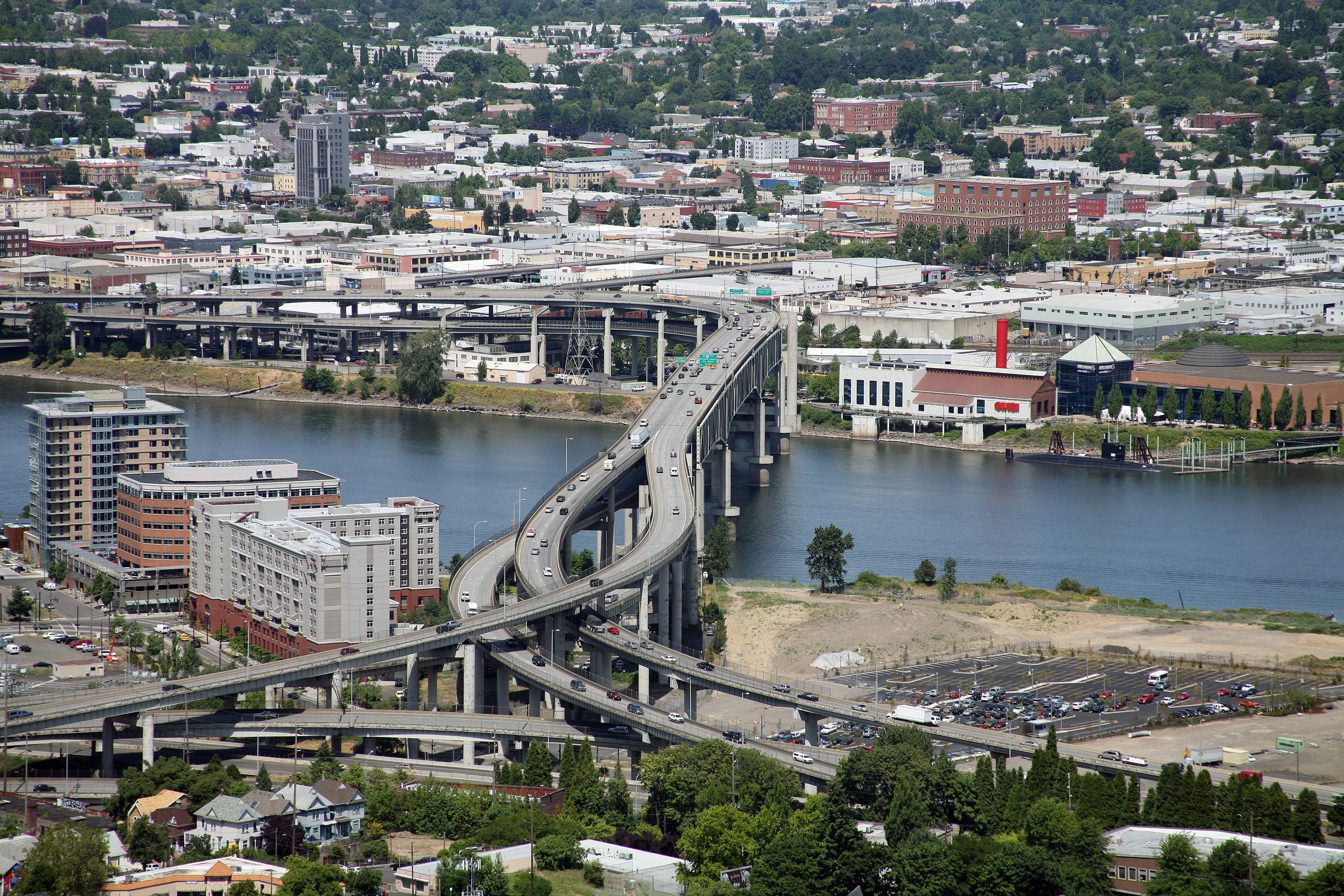
The Marquam Bridge over the Willamette River, viewed from the southwest, atop Marquam Hill

The bridge was designed and built by the Oregon Department of Transportation at a cost of $14 million, equivalent to $139 million today. Funds for the project came from the Federal Highway Transportation Act. The bridge was redecked in 1983. In 1990, the approach lanes from both the east and west were widened to allow four lanes of traffic and an off-ramp to Water Avenue was built. Due to its importance, the Marquam was the first Portland bridge to undergo a seismic retrofit in 1995, which included installation of Italian made bearings add to the piers.

== Design ==
The main span of the bridge is 440 ft (130 m) long and the two side spans are 301 ft (92 m) each for a total length of 1,043 ft (318 m). Vertical clearance of the lower deck is 130 feet (40 m) and the upper deck is 20 feet (6.1 m) above the lower. The Marquam was designed by Ivan D. Merchant and Pieter Kiewit Sons Company served as the general contractor. At the eastern end of the bridge, on the lower deck, is a ramp stub which was intended to connect to the later abandoned Mount Hood Freeway project. The bridge was designed with four lanes in each direction. It was the first double-deck freeway bridge in the state. Part of the design process also utilized computers for various calculations.

The Marquam Bridge was built with economy in mind and the public at large reacted unfavorably to the structure's bland aesthetics, which included a formal protest from the Portland Arts Commission. (In particular, it blocked the view of downtown from the Union Avenue Viaduct.) This led to public input in the design of the Fremont Bridge. During Mayor Vera Katz's State of the City address in 2001, she said, "It’s like having the Berlin Wall dividing east and west, with all the subtle charm of the Daytona 500 smack dab in the middle of our city." The bridge crosses over and runs parallel to parts of the now named Vera Katz Eastbank Esplanade.

== Future ==
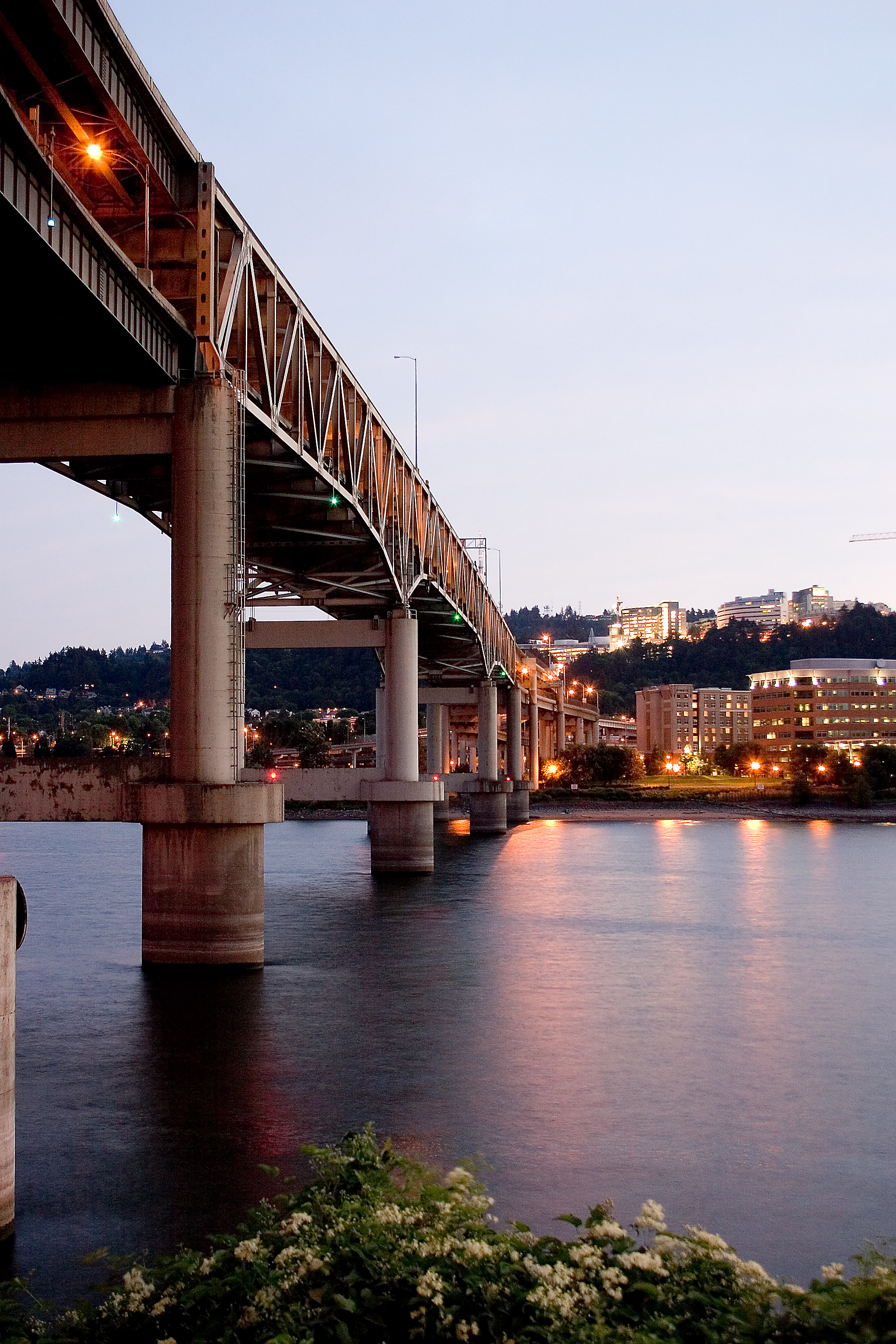
A view of the bridge at dusk

Options to replace the bridge historically considered have been to reroute I-5 over the existing I-405 alignment, connecting I-84 to I-5 at the Fremont Bridge interchange, following the US 30 alignment, and removing the Marquam permanently. Another option would build a tunnel under the Willamette River approximately following the existing I-5 alignment, and remove the Marquam Bridge permanently.

Proposals have been made to replace the Eastbank Freeway portion of I-5 with a tunnel, connecting with the existing alignment at the Marquam Bridge and the Rose Quarter. This would free up space along the Willamette River for development.

== See also ==
- List of bridges documented by the Historic American Engineering Record in Oregon
- List of crossings of the Willamette River
