= Paul Thiry =

Paul Thiry is the name of:

- Paul-Henri Thiry (1723–1789), a.k.a. Baron d'Holbach, German-French author, philosopher and encyclopedist
- Paul Thiry (architect) (1904–1993), American architect, chief architect of the Century 21 Exposition
