= Scott/Coman Hall =

Coordinates: 46.73476°N 117.16413°W

Scott Coman Hall, pictured in 2019

Scott/Coman Hall is a residence hall complex located on the main campus of Washington State University in Pullman, Washington. It consists of two separate buildings, Coman Hall and Scott Hall.

== Building layout and background ==
Sundown at Coman Hall in 1959

Scott Hall and Coman Hall are connected via a walkway that extends from Scott's first floor to Coman's lower level. Scott/Coman Hall was completed in 1958 and was designed by Paul Thiry. With a few exceptions, Scott and Coman halls are designed as mirrored versions of each another. Both halls have four floors and were built to hold 142 residents per building, 284 in total. The ground floor of each building has a study lounge and another lounge for more social and relaxing purposes. The front desk of Scott/Coman is found in the front door of Scott Hall, serving as the main desk for both buildings. Something semi-unique to Scott/Coman is each building has a set of ramps along with the staircases. In the time period that the halls were built these ramps were more of an homage to the European modernist style that the buildings were designed after. Throughout time however, the ramps served well for disability access and an easier move in for residents. This was a unique feature given that disability access was not a priority for university buildings in the mid-1900s. Since the buildings only have 4 floors and there are ramps and stairs, elevators were never part of the plan for the halls and none have been any installed since they were built. The only other residence hall at WSU to incorporate ramps is the neighboring Regents Hill Hall (built prior to Scott/Coman Hall in 1952). Scott/Coman also has smaller lounges, equipped with a kitchenette, on the second floor of each building. Scott/Coman Hall was originally designed as an all-women's dormitory, most likely designed this way in tandem with Regents Hill Hall. Similar to Regents Hill, Scott/Coman Hall was named in honor of the university's governing board, albeit specifically two separate individuals: Edwin T. Coman (member of the board of Regents from 1915 to 1922) and John C. Scott (board member from 1951 to 1955). Along with most of WSU, Scott/Coman Hall was eventually made into a coed residence hall.

== Architecture and design ==
Scott Hall, 1958

The lead architect behind the buildings was Paul Thiry. Thiry was known for his work in architectural modernism, specifically in the Pacific Northwest area. Thiry carried a consistent style within his buildings throughout his career. He was involved in many residential projects, designing many architecturally futuristic homes in the Seattle, WA area. Thiry also did work on residence halls and educational buildings for Washington State University, the University of Washington, and Western Washington University. Thiry also served as the chief architect in the 1962 World Fair, or the "Century 21 Exposition," in Seattle. For the fair, Thiry designed the iconic Washington State Pavilion, now called KeyArena. Most of Thiry's designs carried the same motifs of sharp, harder edges with smooth surfaces, overhangs where the upper part of the building comes out past the base, along with an emphasis on natural light. All these architectural characteristics went into the design of Scott/Coman Hall. Both halls are large, sharp edged rectangular buildings, with a smooth concrete base on the outside, equipped with entrances that feature large overhangs above, that are supported by rectangular supports. Two of the walls in each lounge on the ground floors are made completely of windows, emphasizing the open feel and natural light. Even the rooms for the residents feature windows that stretch all the way across the wall of the room. Many of these attributes are shared with Thiry's first WSU residence hall, Regents Hill Hall. The combination of Scott/Coman, Regents Hill Hall, and Streit Perham Hall (constructed in 1962) represented a movement for the university. All the buildings were residence halls on the northern end of campus, all were originally built for women residents, and all were inspired architecturally by European modernism. This residential complex was meant to usher in a new era of community and development at WSU. Throughout the 1950s and 1960s, other educational buildings were constructed at WSU, all supporting this movement.

== Community history ==
Woman in 1959 stands in field in front of Scott/Coman Hall (buildings on the left) and Regents Hill Hall (building on the right)

Prior to construction, WSU intended for the community of Scott/Coman Hall to be scholarly. The idea for a community like this was exemplified first by the architecture and design of the buildings. Scott/Coman did not hold similar architectural characteristics to the buildings of WSU built before World War II. Before the 1950s, the majority of buildings, including residence halls, were designed incorporating elements from older architectural movements and they also utilized the surrounding landscape differently. Some of these traditional elements include ornate detailed buildings that stand monumentally out of the surrounding landscape. Buildings would sometimes be encompassed tightly by similar buildings and symmetrically placed trees. Building elements could include brick, large classical columns, and spires. While there was no particular architectural style for a college campus, generally any style adopted by a university at the time was older and well known. The modernist design of Scott/Coman, along with other buildings built in the 1950s and 1960s at WSU, was meant to break that mold. The architecture of the buildings was meant to be a cutting-edge, making it a place where people wanted to live and even more so, study and receive a higher education. This is also represented through Scott/Coman's massive lounges dedicated for studying, something unique to residence halls at WSU in that time period. This played a role in WSU's desired transition to be identified as a research institute that is advanced and is looking toward the future. This is not just shown through the architecture of Scott/Coman, but through the make-up of the community as well. Scott/Coman, along with the other new residence halls, was originally designed as an all-women's dormitory. The modernist style of the halls was in line with a cultural movement in the United States surrounding gender roles and the appeal of a modern home to housewives. In the late 1950s, the modern characteristics of the halls made them a place more attractive for women to want to live and go to university. This is especially true in comparison to what older residence halls had to offer. The temporary post-WWII buildings brought in from Vancouver, WA to adjust for the population boom, like West House (or Pioneer Hall), paled in comparison to the sleek design and living spaces in Scott/Coman Hall. Similar comparisons can be made to the older, all female, residence halls like Wilmer Davis. Older halls like this were dated for the time period and offered much less space for residents.

== Building legacy ==
Over Scott/Coman's 60-year life span, other than the transition to a co-ed residence hall, not a lot has changed. Except for changes to the landscape surrounding Scott/Coman Hall, the buildings stand architecturally indistinguishable from the 1958 construction and the community still revolves around a pursuit for a more advanced educational experience. The Residence Life department of WSU has worked to maintain the original community of Scott/Coman, labeling the residence hall as a Scholars Hall, embedded with a “Scholars Code.” Scott/Coman Hall is significant to the WSU community because it is emblematic of the transition of the university's image to a cutting-edge research institute, a transition called for by the cultural and population shift after WWII. With each year this significance grows as other buildings from the same time period are torn down, removing physical evidence of the important shift that WSU underwent in the 1950s. Kruegel-McAllister Hall is an example of this. Kruegel-McAllister was built in a similar time period to buildings like Scott/Coman, Regents Hill, Streit/Perham Hall etc., and was designed with a similar style. However, the McAllister portion of Kruegel-McAllister was demolished in 2015. There have also been plans to demolish Heald Hall (1962) and Johnson Hall (1962), both buildings built in accordance with WSU's image shift after WWII. In a housing plan report for WSU, published in 2010, there was a proposal to demolish Regents Hill Hall and Streit-Perham Hall, replacing them with new residence halls. However, Scott/Coman Hall was kept as a part of the plan.
