= Aubrey Watzek Library =

Library at Lewis and Clark College, Portland, Oregon

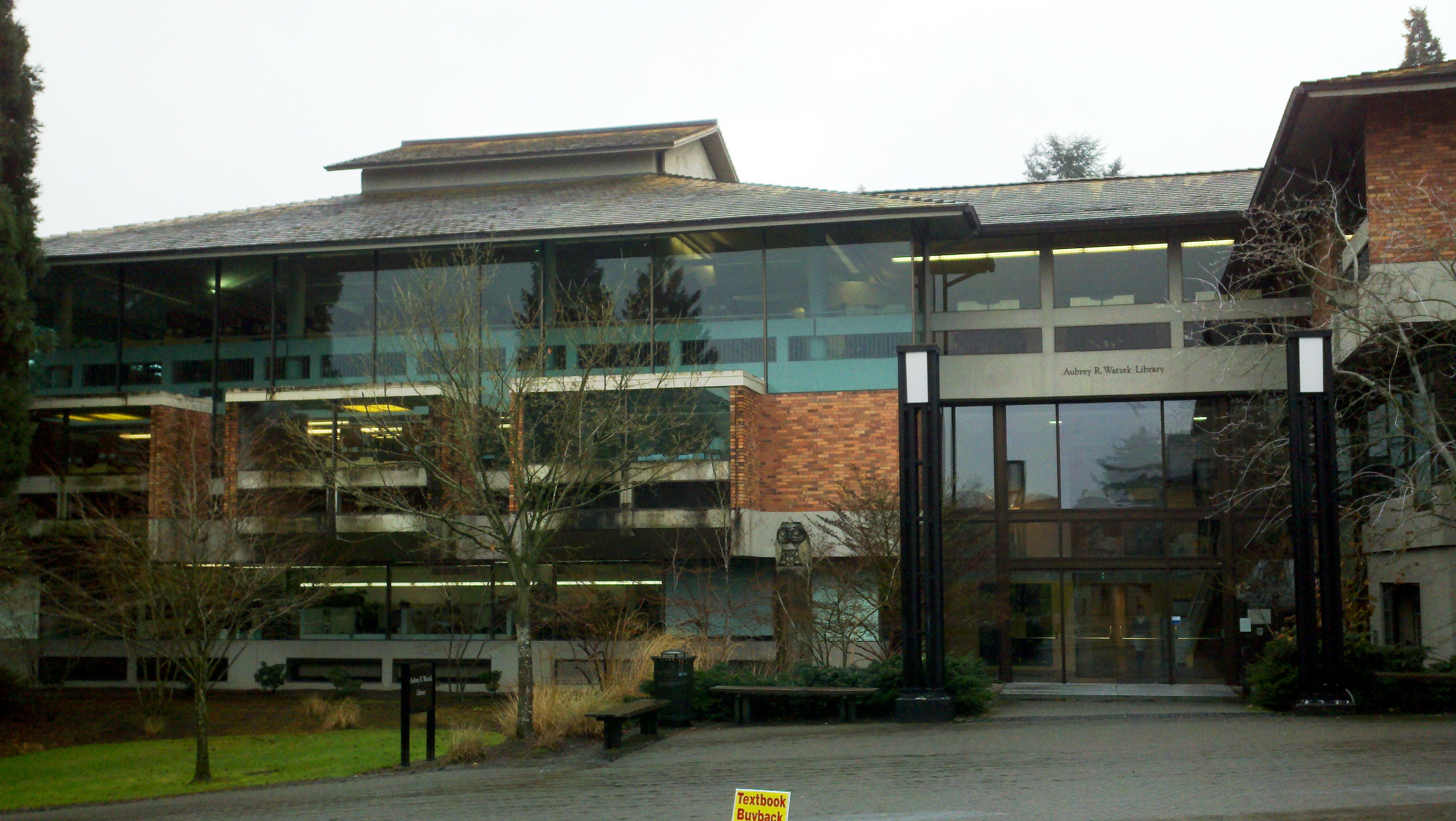
- The library building's exterior in 2010
- 45.45095°N 122.66909°W
- Location: Portland, Oregon, U.S., United States
- Architect: Paul Thiry

Other information
- Website: library.lclark.edu

The Aubrey Watzek Library is a library on the Lewis & Clark College campus, in Portland, Oregon. It is named after attorney and lumber baron Aubrey R. Watzek, whose papers are stored at the library.

== History ==
The building was designed by Paul Thiry and completed in 1967. The library doubled in size during renovations completed in the mid-1990s by Hoffman Construction.

In 2016, a copy of the 1599 Geneva Bible was rediscovered in the library's basement.

== Special collections ==
Since 2001, the library has housed the literature of the Lewis and Clark Expedition collection in a special collections facility. The William Stafford Archive was established in the special collections in 2008.
