= Agnes Flanagan Chapel =

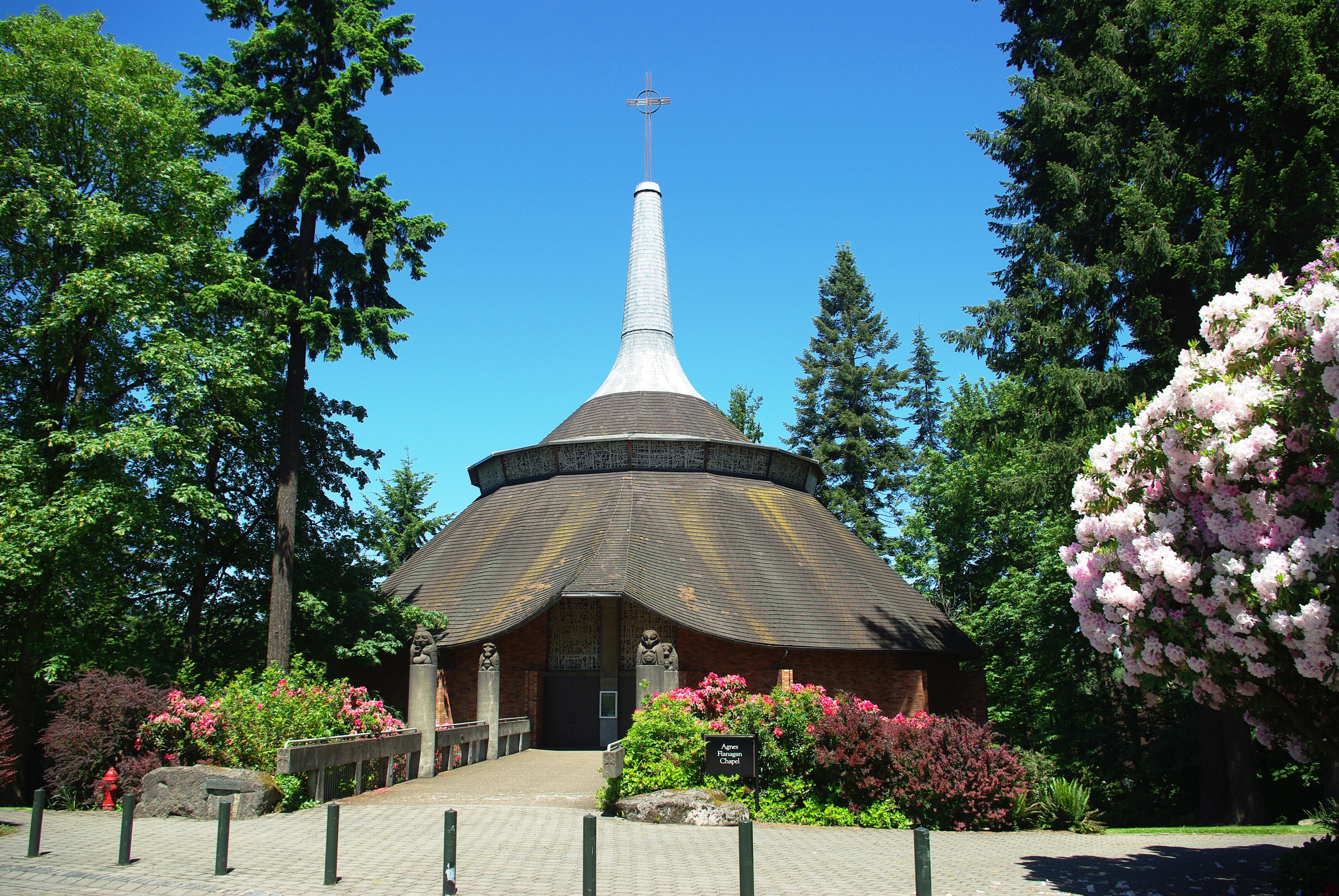
- The chapel's exterior in 2009

- Location within Portland, Oregon

General information
- Location: Portland, Oregon, United States
- Coordinates: 45.45078°N 122.67146°W

Agnes Flanagan Chapel is a chapel on the Lewis & Clark College campus, in Portland, Oregon. The building was designed by Paul Thiry, completed in 1968, and officially dedicated in February 1969.

== Design ==
The chapel was built in a 16-side design with stained glass windows depicting stories from the Book of Genesis. It has seating for 650 people.

Due to the chapel's 16 sides, it is home to a specially designed 1971 Casavant pipe organ which hangs from its ceiling. It is the world's only circular pipe organ, and was inaugurated by world-renowned organist Virgil Fox.
