= St. Demetrios Greek Orthodox Church (Seattle) =

Coordinates: 47°38′18″N 122°18′27″W

Saint Demetrios Greek Orthodox Church
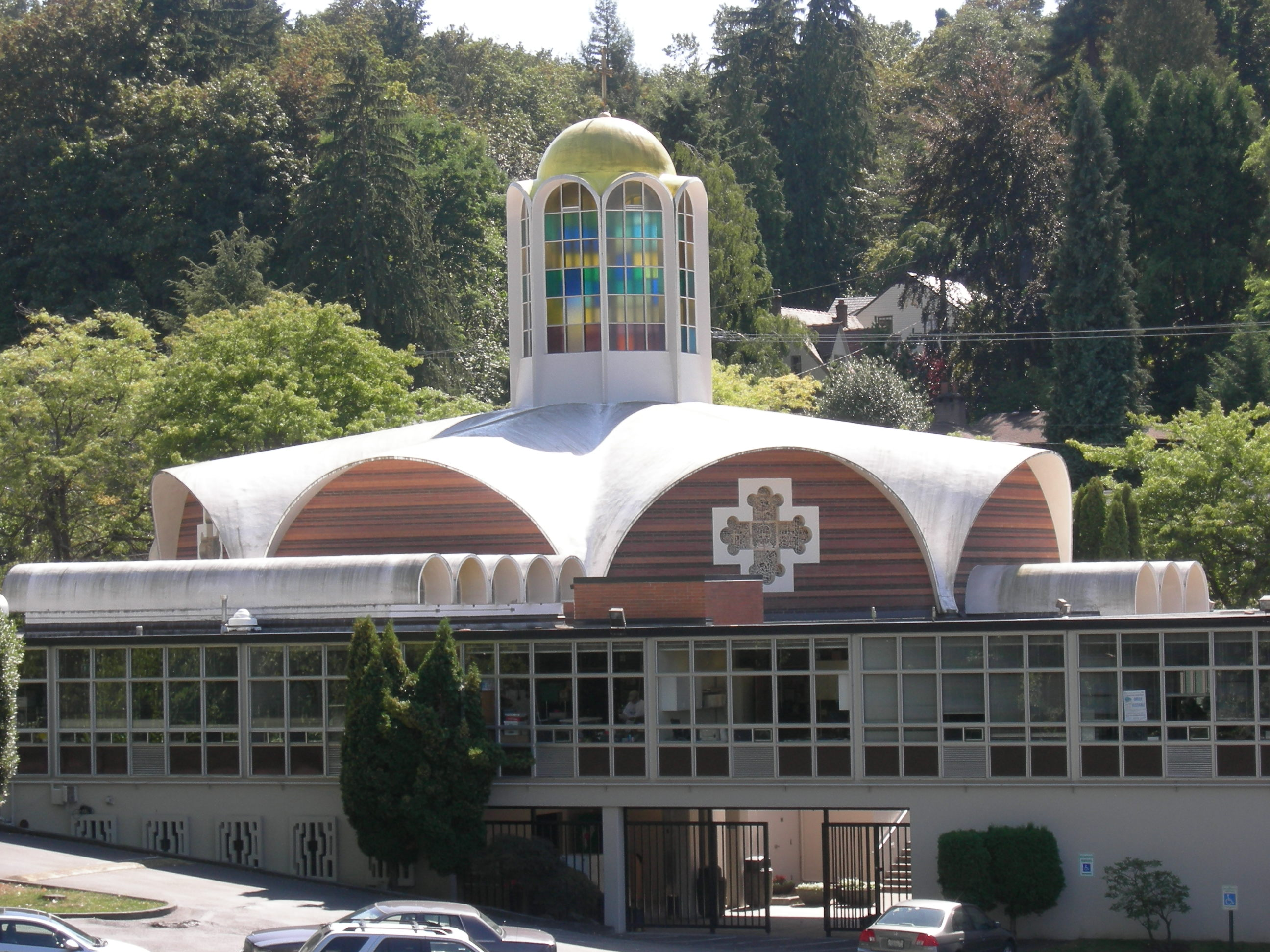
- Saint Demetrios Greek Orthodox Church
- Location: 2100 Boyer Avenue East, Seattle, Washington
- Country: United States
- Denomination: Greek Orthodox (Eastern Orthodox)

History
- Founded: October 30, 1916
- Dedication: Saint Demetrius of Thessaloniki
- Dedicated: March 31, 1963

Architecture
- Architect: Paul Thiry
- Completed: 1962

Specifications
- Materials: Reinforced concrete, brick, glass mosaic

Administration
- Archdiocese: Greek Orthodox Archdiocese of America
- Diocese: Metropolis of San Francisco

Clergy
- Priest: Rev. Fr. Photios Dumont (Protopresbyter)

Saint Demetrios Greek Orthodox Church is a church in Seattle, Washington. It is part of the Greek Orthodox metropolis or diocese of San Francisco, within the Greek Orthodox Archdiocese of America. It is Seattle's oldest Greek Orthodox congregation.

The present St. Demetrios Church in the Montlake neighborhood (completed in 1962) was designed by Paul Thiry, one of the principal architects of the Century 21 Exposition Seattle's World's Fair that same year and of the Museum of History and Industry (MOHAI), formally in Montlake.

The church has held a bazaars and festivals on a scale well beyond a typical parish church festival. As of 2007, the festival lasts for three days, and requires a continuous shuttle bus service from as far away as the Northgate and South Kirkland Park and Ride lots, as well as from nearby school parking lots.

== History ==
The history of St. Demetrios Greek Orthodox Church reflects the history of Seattle and of the United States in general, the history of Seattle's Greek community, and the tensions resulting from differing interpretations of Eastern Orthodox Christianity within the congregation and from differing views on the relative power of the Archdiocese and the individual congregation.

=== The Greco-Russian Church ===
Seattle's first Greek settlers arrived in the 1880s. By the start of the 20th century, several had established themselves as shopkeepers (especially in food-related industries) and at least one owned a lodging house.

In 1892, the city's Greeks joined with its Russians, successfully petitioning the Russian government for the formation of the St. Spiridon parish with a bilingual priest. Greek immigrants donated the land for the original church at 817 Lakeview Avenue, which was variously known as the Greek-Russian Church, the Greco-Russian Church, and the Greek Catholic Russian Church. In fact, the priest who was sent, Sebastian Dabovich, was trilinugal: an 1895 Seattle Post-Intelligencer article notes that he preached a sermon in English.

The Greco-Russian Church opened in 1895; its direct descendant today is Saint Spiridon Orthodox Cathedral, of the Orthodox Church in America.

In this era, Seattle saw a large influx of young Greek men, but few women and families. Mootafes et al. report that "Perhaps a dozen or so Greek women lived in Seattle before 1920, most of whom were from Leros," the place of origin of the city's first Greek immigrants. Many were physical laborers, but they tended to form small businesses as soon as they had the opportunity, again often in food-related industries. Because there were few Greek women, intermarriage was common. Many were affiliated with St. Spiridon's, where the new priest, Michael G. Andreades (served 1905–1915), continued the trilingual tradition. There were also occasional visits to Seattle by Greek Orthodox priests from Portland, Oregon, as well is itinerant priests.

=== Founding a Greek church ===
A Greek Club was formed no later than 1909 and in 1913 a Greek American Political Club. In 1915 over 300 of the city's 2,000 Greeks gathered at the Labor Temple to discuss building a church. They appear to have started holding some services informally that year. The Greek Community of Seattle (later Greek Community Association) was formally incorporated October 30, 1916, with the specific purpose of establishing a church. The new congregation took its name from an icon of Saint Demetrius of Thessaloniki donated by one of its parishioners, Alexander Spetsieris (Spencer), who had brought the icon over from Kefalonia to give to his son, Demetrios (later known as James).

From 1916, the Holy Synod of Greece began assigning priests to the Seattle parish, but typically only for a few months at a time, often with lapses between. During these lapses, priests from St. Spiridon or from Portland would administer sacraments.

Initially the congregation met in a rented hall, which one parishioner described years later as "rickety". In 1917 the Community Association purchased a ballfield at Yale Avenue North and Thomas Street in the Cascade neighborhood with the intent of building a church; apparently, the neighborhood was chosen because most of the few Greek women in the city lived in Cascade. A further organization, the Hellenic Association of the Greek Community of Seattle, Washington was formed in support of the church and of Greek education in Seattle. A Women's Hellenic Club formed in 1919 or 1920 and a Hellenic Commercial Club on October 30, 1919. All of these organizations were involved in fundraising for the new church.

A cornerstone was laid in 1919. Funds were raised only with great difficulty from this largely poor community, but construction began in April 1921 and the first service was held November 20, 1921. One stained glass window in the church contained the name "St. James Greek Orthodox Church", James being the prevalent translation of Demetrius at the time.

=== The 1920s ===
Father Stephanos Phoutrides (1891–1946) was the congregation's first long term priest. A Yale University graduate, he came to Seattle in 1924 and remained until 1932; he later returned to St. Demetrios 1935–1939, after which he served at Seattle's new Church of the Assumption. As Washington State's only Greek Orthodox priest, he traveled widely to attend to a congregation that extended well beyond Seattle. (In 1925 the state's second Greek Orthodox church was founded in Tacoma.) He used English heavily in his Seattle services, partly for the benefit of the many non-Greek women married to Greek men, and the children of those couples. He began a bilingual Sunday school and, in 1926, founded a program to teach Greek to native English-speakers.

In 1924 Seattle's Hellenic Civic Society (HCS) started an English-language monthly The Washington Hellenic Review, probably unique in the country at that time. The HCS also successfully persuaded Seattle Public Schools to start evening English language classes for Greek immigrants.

The following year, on June 14, 1925, for the first time a Greek Orthodox bishop visited Seattle. The church, already operating for three and a half years, was formally consecrated, and Father Phoutrides was given the rank of Economos, or steward of the church.

During this period, the church first began holding bazaars as fundraisers. The Greek community continued to found new organizations, notably, in 1928, a chapter of the American Hellenic Educational Progressive Association (AHEPA). This would continue in the next decade with a chapter of the Greek American Progressive Association (GAPA) in 1930 and the Washington Hellenic Political Club (later Hellenic Progressive Political Club of Washington) in 1932. The community also, in 1929, raised money to give oil heat to the church and to pay off its mortgage.

=== The Depression years ===
Although Seattle's Greeks were not wealthy, they shared in the prosperity of the 1920s. Some lived in an almost entirely Greek milieu; others were far more assimilated. There were many Greek-language performances of music, as well as theater and lectures, and Greek community banquets were on a par with those of the city's most established ethnic groups.

As with the rest of the city, all of this would be threatened by the Great Depression of the 1930s. Further, at almost the same time the economy began to fail, Seattle's Greek community underwent theological disagreements that ultimately split the congregation in two.

With the onset of the Depression, the church Board reduced the fees for sacraments and reduced Father Phoutrides' salary, while urging parishioners who could afford to do so to give monetary gifts to the priest when they received sacraments. Seattle's Greeks rented the Scandinavia Hotel as a shelter for those rendered homeless within their community. Further, as of December 8, 1930, the finances of the church were for the first time separated from those of the city's Greek community. There were fewer banquets and more picnics.

In 1932, Father Phoutrides left to take over priestly duties for a congregation in Oakland, California; Archimandrite Germanos Papanugiotou came in the opposite direction. This was a turbulent time in the church: of Phoutrides' departure, The Washington Hellenic Review wrote:

Like the pastors of every community in the country, during troubled days of religious strife, of reform and of reaction, he has faced warring factions, inefficient leadership, self-centered bigotry, and far-fetched idealism falling pitifully short of its makr, but weathered the storms with the steadfast confidence of the believer.

By February 1933, St. Demetrios was US$1,900 in debt and could pay neither the priest nor the teacher of the Greek school. Further, there was great disagreement within the congregation over the new constitution adopted by the 1932 national convention of the Greek Orthodox Archdiocese of North and South America. The result was that St. Demetrios was not formally affiliated with the archdiocese until 1957.

Amidst these continuing difficulties, Archimandrite Papanugiotou exchanged positions in the summer of 1934 with Father Haramlambos ("Harry") Skoufis, who came to Seattle from Los Angeles. However, Harry Skoufis soon moved on to Spokane, and on April 4, 1935, the community voted "by a landslide" to invite Father Phoutrides to return.

One of the few accomplishments of Father Papanugiotou's tenure was the establishment of a women's choir, instructed by Marianne Flanders of the Cornish School; he also introduced an organist. In 1938, the Board of the church decided that they wished to bring in a chanter. Budget limitations led them to seek someone who was also qualified to teach Sunday school and direct the choir. Archbishop Athenagoras told them that there was only one man in the United States qualified for all three positions: Constantine Miolonopoulos, who thus came to Seattle from Salt Lake City.

Discord continued over the relative role of clergy and laity and over the respective use of Greek and English in services, ultimately splitting the congregation. In August 1939 the new parish, the Church of the Assumption, invited Father Phoutrides to become their pastor. The next month, he accepted, and left St. Demetrios, replaced promptly by Archimandrite Efstathios Georgiades.

=== The 1940s ===
The story of St. Demetrios Church in the 1940s is less well documented than the 1930s, because of the demise of The Washington Hellenic Review, nor do there appear to be surviving church bulletins from the time.

Because Greece had already been invaded by Fascist Italy, Greek Americans were generally in favor of America's entry into World War II. When soldiers were married before heading off to war, the weddings were so large that the receptions had to be held at Eagles Auditorium. Throughout the war, the church continued to hold picnics, fundraising bazaars, and cultural events, and to host Greek American soldiers and sailors who found themselves stationed in Seattle. Other Greek groups in Seattle held fundraisers for the church, as well as for the American National Red Cross and Greek War Relief.

Archimandrite Efstathios Georgiades health did not allow him to continue long in his position. He was succeeded briefly by Archimandrite Vasilios Germanis and then in September 1941 by Father Haramlambos ("Harry") Gavalas (born Tsavalas), who remained for 15 years. Gavalas was less fluent in English than many of his predecessors and successors.

The dissension that had split the parish in two was largely put aside in the face of war. Most of the young men joined the military; few women served in the military, but many supported the Red Cross, joined USO, participated in War bond drives, and so forth. Among the occupied nations of Europe, Greece received particular sympathy from Americans; between that and the Greek's high-profile involvement in fundraising activities, often involving specifically Greek cultural aspects, non-Greeks in Seattle became more aware of the Greek community in their midst. Seattle's continually increasing number of Greek organizations had come together to form the Greek United Communities and Associations of Seattle. The end of the war brought a new wave of Greek immigration and Greek War Relief transformed into aid to reconstruction.

Meanwhile, the Cascade neighborhood around the church was turning more commercial and less residential. Shortly after Father Gavalas arrival in 1941, the church established a building committee to seek a new site. In 1947, they purchased two lots on Third Avenue North and John Street (now part of Seattle Center) with the intention of building a new church and social center; they received a reduced price because of the intended use.

=== The 1950s ===
In the 1950s, Saint Demetrios Church continued to experience intermarriages, continuing a situation where many adult members of the congregation were themselves non-Greek. Girls growing up in the church were often educated as well as the boys, but when they reached adulthood typically became homemakers rather than entering the workforce. Men still generally sat on one side of the church and women on the other during services, although at least one non-Greek wife violated this custom, which would finally go into abeyance some time in the 1960s.

The various community associations continued their activities. There were some tensions with the Archdiocese because the St. Demetrios congregation maintained a relatively independent course. An example of this is that in 1952, the St. Demetrios choir was prevented from singing at a Portland, Oregon Greek Orthodox Northwest Choir Convention because the St. Demetrios Church's women's organizations were not associated with the national Philoptochos Society; they somewhat reluctantly affiliated, but did not dissolve more local organizations such as the longstanding Women's Hellenic Club. The 1953 Northwest Choir Convention was hosted in Seattle.

The church continued to be involved in relief aid for Greece. From about 1957, momentum began to build for a budget to build the long-discussed new church. The Third Avenue North and John property was sold to become part of the grounds for the World's Fair, providing the funds for the purchase of a different property. After an unsuccessful effort to find an appropriate site on Capitol Hill, property—the Dahlialand Gardens, the last remnant of the Wheeler family dahlia farm that had once extended clear to Portage Bay—was purchased in Montlake at 2100 Boyer Avenue East.

As Father Gavalas approached retirement, the congregation requested that their next priest be a fluent English-speaker. Father Arthur Saridakis came in September 1956, with Father Gavalas continuing as his assistant for about a year. For health reasons, Saridakis tenure turned out to be brief: he served only until 1959, relieved by several interim pastors along the way. However, he did initiate a pattern of greater outreach by the church to the broader Seattle community. Through his efforts and others', on February 18, 1959, Orthodox Christianity formally gained the status of Washington State's fourth "major religion" (along with Protestantism, Catholicism, and Judaism.

Relations with the breakaway Church of the Assumption continued to improve. In the mid-1950s, there was discussion of reunification, but nothing came of this. Nonetheless, in 1957, St. Demetrios finally affiliated officially with the Greek Orthodox Archdiocese of North and South America.

In July 1959, Father Neketas S. Palassis (usually known to the parishioners as "Father Neketas" rather than "Father Palassis") took over as pastor of the parish, his first assignment as a priest. He promptly initiated a roughly monthly bulletin, St. Demetrios Logos, which contained religious articles and a journal of community activities.

=== The 1960s ===
==== A new church in Montlake ====
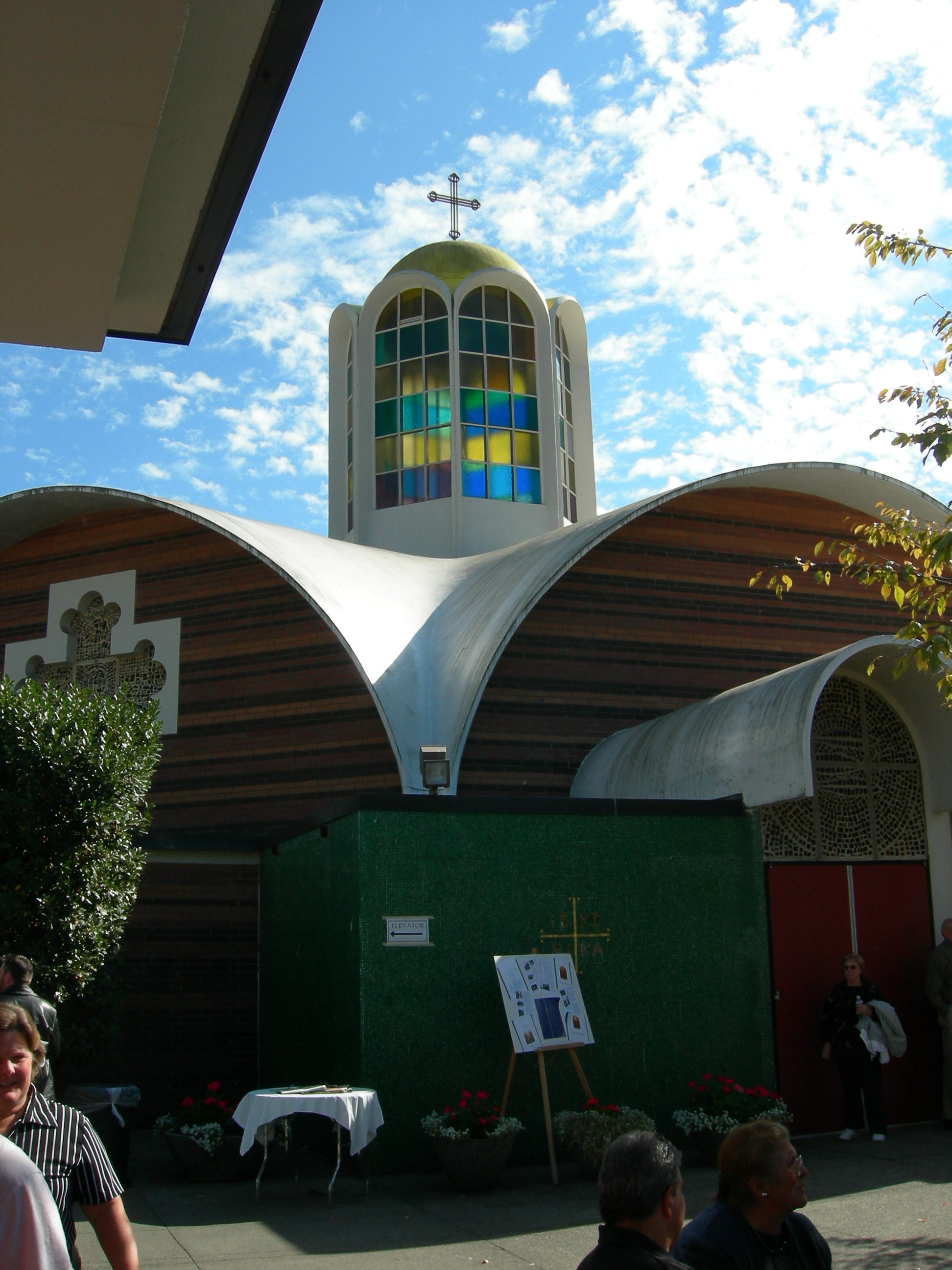
The present St. Demetrios Church, 2006

The central fact of Father Palassis' term at the church was the development of a new church building. An additional parcel of land was bought on the north side of the Boyer property, allowing access from Lynn Street to what would become a rear parking lot for the new church. Continued fundraising led to a construction budget of $500,000, about half of what architect Paul Thiry estimated would be needed for a true Byzantine church complex, and plans were scaled back accordingly, mainly by postponing the construction of a community center and focusing on the church proper. G. John Doces led the building committee during the push toward construction; Father Palassis was also a key committee member.

During a visit to Seattle by Bishop Demetrios, ground was ceremonially broken on the new church on May 14, 1961. Construction contracts were not signed, however, until October. A cornerstone was laid in the presence of Archbishop Iakovos February 4, 1962; the archbishop also spoke at the Century 21 Exposition and was feted by civic and religious leaders including Governor Albert D. Rosellini. On March 31, 1963, the last service was held at the Cascade church. The parishioners boarded buses and cars to their new home; they were preceded by the church's relics, bone fragments of six thousand monk martyrs of St. Sava Monastery. The ceremony of Thyrnanixia (the opening of the doors) was followed by a gala dance at the Olympic Hotel. Church attendance soon exceeded the previous church's capacity.

Landscape architect Richard Haag, later the designer of Gas Works Park oversaw the landscaping of the new church. The church architecture drew great attention, with organizations from throughout Seattle paying visits. A three-page article appeared in Architecture/West, praising the ingenuity in "adapting materials and techniques of the 20th Century to a church that follows early Greek Orthodox architectural forms, with interior spaces dictated by centuries old liturgical forms." The construction of mosaics in the apse and altar niches of the church continued into 1964, among the first Byzantine-style mosaics on the West Coast of the United States. Photographs of the new church were exhibited at the Protestant and Orthodox Center at the 1964 New York World's Fair, one of fewer than ten churches so honored. Other mosaic work would continue until 1967, and corrective work on the roof occurred in 1967–1968.

The old church was sold to Overall Laundry next door. Both were eventually torn down to build the R.E.I. Flagship Store, which opened in 1996.

==== The mid-'60s ====
In 1965, at the direction of the Archdiocese, Father Palassis joined in discussions in Seattle of unity among faiths, and in 1967 he and Father A. Photius Pentikis of the Church of the Assumption served at each other's churches for two services in April. The Greek Orthodox Youth Association (GOYA) was particularly strong in this period, and in the late 1960s for the first time in decades Greek music for weddings and church affairs was performed by young people.

Meanwhile, fundraising continued to pay off an $89,000 construction debt for the new church. The church published a cookbook, A Taste for It (1964). In 1966, for the first time, women served on the Parish Council. Increasingly assimilated members of the Greek community began to announce in the church bulletin that they would not be publicly observing their name days, although an open house in honor of the priest's name day continued.

==== A change in leadership ====
The official history of the church describes the mid-1960s as "an era of good feeling, a calm period of enjoying a beautiful new church and each other under the able and dedicated leadership of Fr. Neketas Palassis". It also writes that this era "came to a surprising halt on January 9, 1968." Father Palassis and the parish council were informed on two-and-one-half week's notice that Father Palassis was being reassigned to Sioux City, Iowa.

The issue at hand was Father Palassis' dislike of the ecumenism advocated by the archdiocese. In his sermon of January 21, 1968, he declared, "The Orthodox Christian faith… is not an item to be bartered, debated, and finally compromised on the ecumenical altar of humanistic and anthropocentric love which excludes truth and real divine love. … Being part of a church which is becoming Roman Catholic in its administration, Protestant in its faith and Greek Orthodox in its ritual is not for me."

Parish council president Constantine Angelos sent a telegram to Archbishop Iakovos indicating the parish's strong support for their pastor and asking the archbishop to reconsider. 300 parishioners signed a petition to the same effect. The archbishop did not relent. Father Palassis informed the parishioners that he did not intend to go to Iowa; instead, he went under the jurisdiction of the Russian Orthodox Church Outside of Russia, forming the American Orthodox Parish of St. Nectarios. Some sixty parishioners, including four members of the parish council, would leave with him over the next few months.

Father Palassis in his last two sermons at St. Demetrios nonetheless urged the remaining parishioners to give their cooperation and assistance to his replacement, Father A. Homer Demopulos. After the March 3 departure of four parish council members, the remaining council reorganized itself. Bishop Meletios of the Diocese of San Francisco wanted to dissolve the Board and elect another. Father Demopulos (who would come to be called "Father Homer" by his parishioners) informed him that if that were to occur, he would resign. The bishop relented.

=== 1970s ===
Father A. Homer Demopoulos served the church alongside his beloved friends and Byzantine Cantors Costas Exarhos, Valsili Lazarou, Gus Carras, Theofanis Kalasountas, George Haloulakos, and Costas Antonopoulos. Father A. Homer Demopulos turned the church decidedly toward involvement in the broader community. The church's youth groups and Greek school which was led by Despina Haralambidou, Helen Exarhos (who also previously served as church secretary at the older location in the 1960s), and George Maroutsos continued the high level of activity they had reached under Father Palassis. The church continued to participate strongly in the "Christmas around the World" program at nearby MOHAI. Groups such as AHEPA and GAPA continued to thrive. A Greek Orthodox section was formally set aside at Evergreen-Washelli Cemetery in North Seattle. Aid was sent to Greek Cypriots. A Committee for the Elderly was established. Father Gavalas occasionally came back to the church to celebrate the Divine Liturgy.

Further mosaics, constituting a Deesis, were added to the narthex (entryway) of the church in 1973; further mosaics (a Crucifixion and a Descent into Hades) were completed in 1974. The Montlake church was formally consecrated by Archbishop Iakovos in on April 28, 1974, and Father Demopulos was raised to the position of Protopresbyter or Archpriest, the highest honor awarded to a married Orthodox priest.

In the mid-1970s Rev Fr Michael Johnson became the assistant priest at St Demetrios. Fr Michael was very active with the church youth including each summer at All Saints Camp. His wife, Presvytera Maria also was active at the camp each summer. In the early 1990s when Fr Michael retired from his full-time job as an executive writer for the phone company, he became the full-time priest at Saint Nicholas Greek Orthodox Church in Tacoma. Later in the late 1990s he, along with Presvytera by his side, started the Holy Apostles Mission Church in Kenmore Washington. Presvytera died on October 15, 2001, from complications to treatment for breast cancer. She is buried at Evergreen-Washelli Cemetery across the road from Fr Homer. Fr Michael currently is retired and helps out at all the Orthodox churches in the Seattle area. He helped start the current all Orthodox Boy Scout Troop of Seattle. He lives close by to his 3 daughters, Maria, Sofia, and Alexia, and their families.

=== 1980s ===
In 1979, the parish decided that they were ready to undertake further construction, the long-contemplated Community Center adjacent to the church, with a larger kitchen, a library, offices and a large hall, also designed by Paul Thiry. This project, the development of a camp facility on Raft Island near Gig Harbor, Washington, and the continuing expansion of programs for youth, young adults, and the elderly would dominate the 1980s. The necessary fundraising was often achieved through events that were intended also to be fun. The 1980s also saw some tension between secular and religious focus: did All Saints Camp and Retreat Center merit its costs, was there too much emphasis on things like Greek folk dance, should the church hire a business manager or a second priest? Also in this period, the church became more multi-cultural, with Serb, Ethiopian, Eritrean and Romanian parishioners.

Archbishop Iakovos paid a visit for the groundbreaking of the community center, April 19 and April 20, 1980. Phase One of building the center was budgeted at $1,050,000; $480,000 of this represented a mortgage. Construction of this phase (which omitted the planned main kitchen, completion of the library, some external ornamental brickwork, etc.) took place from August 14, 1980, to July 15, 1981. As things happened, completion of the $110,000 kitchen followed on almost immediately, and the center opened with a kitchen September 11, 1981. The resulting facility had 16,000 square feet (1,500 m^{2}) of usable floor space and the main community hall could handle 450 people for theater seating and 350 for a banquet. The compromises had all been postponements, rather than any scaling back of the total plan.

Meanwhile, St. Demetrios Church joined with other members of the Northwest Orthodox Foundation in July 1980 to purchase a camp on Raft Island, formerly the Roman Catholic Camp Blanchet. It was renamed All Saints Camp and Retreat Center. The annual church picnic, which had typically been held in Hall's Lake north of Seattle in Lynnwood, Washington, would from now on be held at the new camp.

During the 1980s, with the economy of Greece no longer in need of such aid as in the past, the church turned some of its charity efforts toward Ethiopia, Armenia (especially after the 1988 Armenian earthquake), victims of the Loma Prieta earthquake in San Francisco, and the poor and homeless in Seattle itself.

In May 1987, Michael Dukakis visited the small hall of St. Demetrios in the run-up to his campaign for the Democratic nomination for President of the United States. In June 1999, the parish would receive another visit from a prominent Greek American politician, Senator Paul Sarbanes.

=== 1990s ===
In the 1990s, the Orthodox Serbs, Ethiopians, Eritreans and Romanians in the St. Demetrios congregation each branched out to form their own parish. A second full-time priest was hired. The church building itself continued to well-maintained and even enhanced, with renovations to the narthex, additional icons and candlestands, and additional mosaics.

Charitable, community, and educational activities continued. With the end of the Cold War era, several people from St. Demetrios went on missions to former East Bloc countries. There was also an increased focus on feeding the homeless.

Father Homer Demopulos died suddenly while on vacation in Belize, May 27, 1993. His memorial services were attended by Bishop Anthony, as well as by 47 priests, four deacons, and over 1,000 laypeople. His widow, Presbetyra Artemis Demopulos, remained with the congregation as its financial secretary. The church library was renamed in his honor.

His successor, Father John P. Angelis served his first Divine Liturgy at St. Demetrios October 3, 1993. He was joined a year-and-a-half later by Deacon Anthony Evengelatos, who was ordained a priest February 26, 1995, remaining with the parish as a second priest. However, he left in July 1997 for a parish of his own in Eugene, Oregon; he was succeeded December 1, 1998, by Father Joseph Velez.

A brief attempt in late 1994 and early 1995 at introducing a second all-English Divine Liturgy proved controversial and was discontinued; an attempt by Bishop Anthony to engineer a compromise (a teaching liturgy for Sunday school children) did not completely resolve the issue.

From May to November 1996, the church held a season of events to celebrate its 75th anniversary (based on the date of opening the church in Cascade).

Two days after Father Velez arrived as a second priest, a house fire killed the daughter and her 2 children (ages 2 and 3) of Father Angelis and his wife Anna. Archbishop Spyridon came from New York to comfort the grieving couple, who observed forty days of mourning. The newly arrived Father Velez took on the primary pastoral duties during this time. Father Velez served until his reassignment as a priest in the US armed forces; he served in Iraq and the Middle East for three years before returning to serve the Orthodox church in the US.

=== 2000s ===
During the years between 2003 and 2008, St. Demetrios experienced a growth in its ministries and under the leadership of several growth minded members who recognized the fact that some 90% of the marriages within the church were Greeks to non-Greeks, and that the principles of Orthodoxy appealed to people who had not grown up in the Orthodox church. The experienced growth was due to people converting to the faith through Chrismation. In June 2007 Despina Haralambidou was taken by the Lord after her battle with cancer, Despina had dedicated her life to children as she did not have any of her own, she served St Demetrios as secretary of the church office for over 25 years, and as a Greek School teacher for over 20 years as well.

On August 1, 2004, the Metropolis of San Francisco appointed Rev. Fr. Photios Dumont as the protopresbyter of St. Demetrios. Fr. John Angelis worked alongside for three years and formally retired on December 31, 2007. Fr. Photios previously served as the protopresbyter of the Resurrection Greek Orthodox Church in Castro Valley, CA.

Today, St. Demetrios comprises a parish of over 650 families and contributes to several local charitable initiatives, including food programs for Seattle-area shelters. The church also regularly supports the Boyer Children's Clinic, raising funds for the organization through its annual Twilight in Seattle Auction.

== Iconography ==
Mosaics of St. Demetrios Church
Work	Artist	Year installed
Theotokos and the Archangels	Tom Wells	1964
St. Basil, St. John Chrysostom	Vasileos Kapousouz	1967
Twelve Apostles and Dove	Vasileos Kapousouz	1967
Baptism of Jesus	Robert Andrews	early 1970s
Deesis	Robert Andrews	1973
Crucifixion, Resurrection	Robert Andrews	1974, 1975
Taking Christ Down from Cross	Robert Andrews	1982
Christ the Teacher, Moses	Robert Andrews	1987
Presentation to the Temple	Robert Andrews	1992
Christ Blessing the Children	Robert Andrews	1992
Ascending Angels	Robert Andrews	1995
Pantocrator and Band of Saints	Robert Andrews	1998
Border for Ascending Angels	Robert Andrews	1998
Border between Ascending Angels	Robert Andrews	1995

Painted Icons of St. Demetrios Church
Work	Artist	Year installed
Icons on Iconostasis	Father Meletios, Mount Athos monk	1963
The Last Supper	Prebetyra Sophronia Tomaras	1963
Dormition	Vasileos Kapousouz	1972
Six-Winged Seraphim Icons	Vasileos Kapousouz	1972

== Bazaars and festivals ==
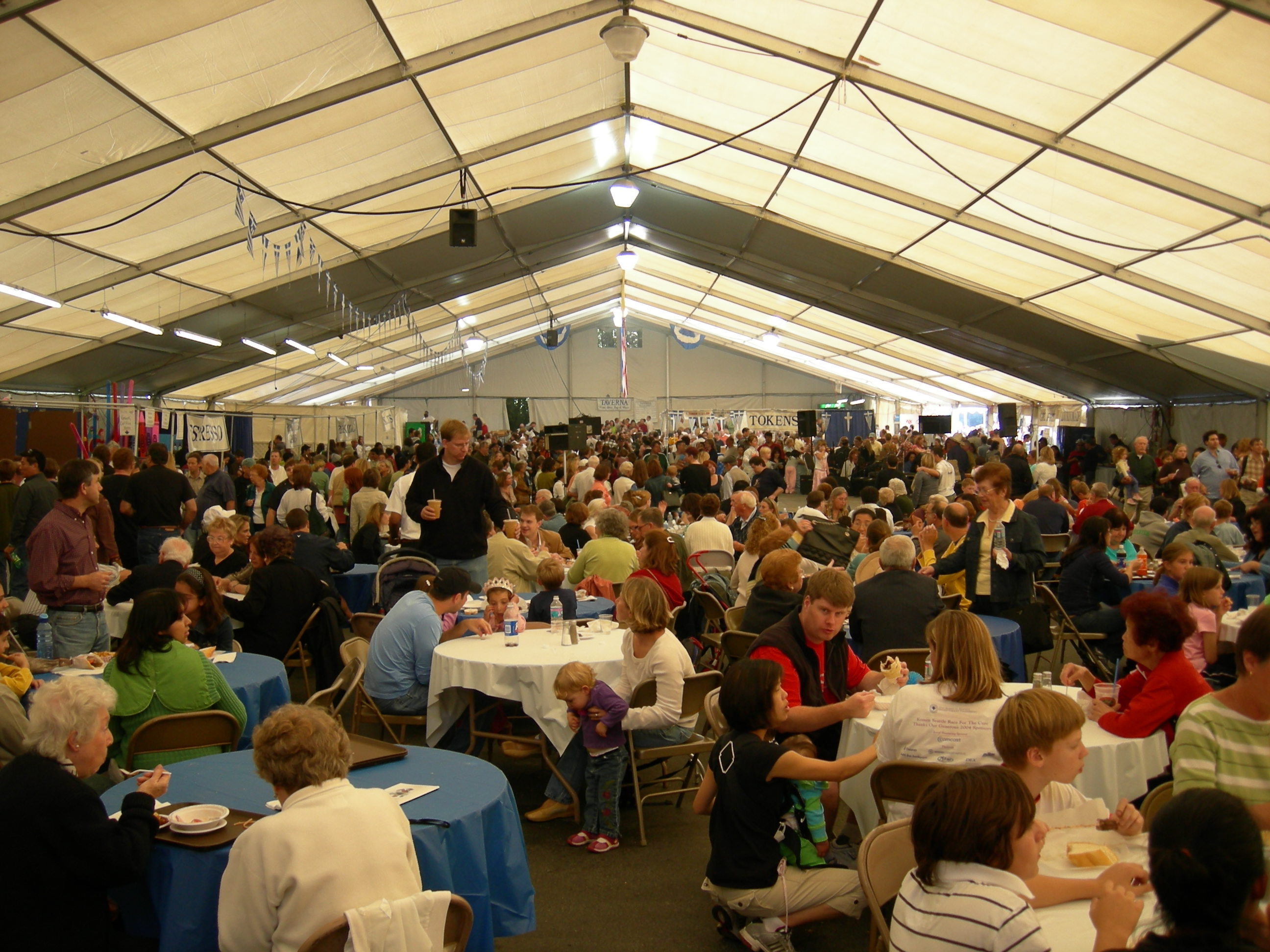
Greek Festival, 2006.

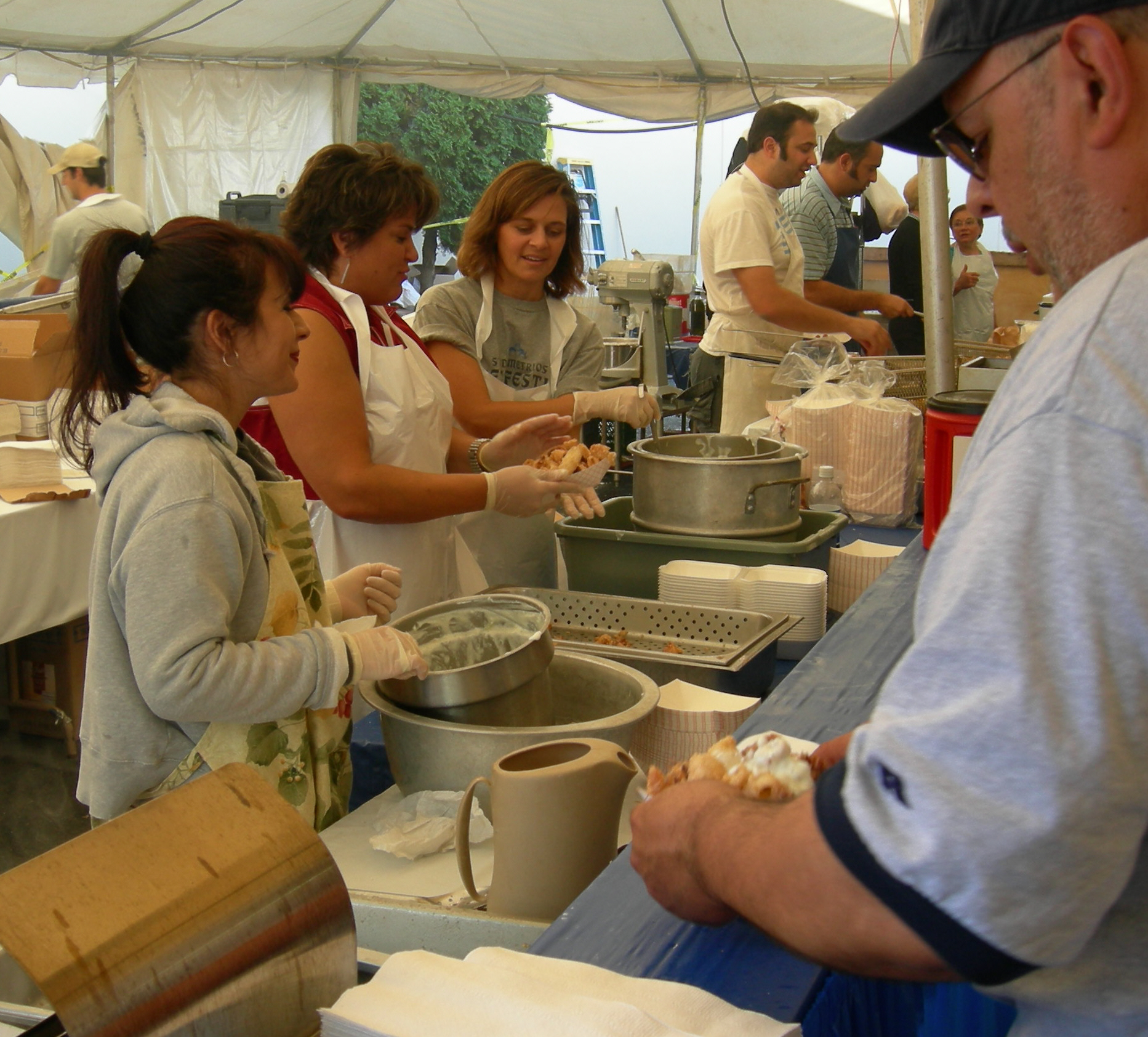
Cooking calamari during the Greek Festival, 2006.

St. Demetrios church has hosted numerous bazaars and festivals since 1921. Early bazaars were in November and December, with embroidered and crocheted children's articles (intended as Christmas gifts), coffee, and Greek pastries for sale in the church hall. The importance of these bazaars in the church's finances can be gleaned from a report that the first bazaar (in 1921) raised $3,000 for the church: in 1918, the largest single donation toward the construction of the new church was only $100.

These early bazaars were organized by the Women's Hellenic Club, the Sunday school, and the Greek school. At some point, a raffle was introduced. Through 1959, the bazaars were held in the basement of the church in Cascade.

In 1960 and 1961, the bazaar was held at Eagles Auditorium; the 1961 bazaar included a fashion show. In 1962 and 1963, bazaars were held earlier, in October, at the Norway Center. In 1964, the bazaar was moved to the new Montlake church, where the bazaars and festivals have been hosted ever since. Besides the fundraising, the bazaars now featured tours of the church and lectures about Orthodox Christianity.

The first bazaar at the new church was such a success that the sweets sold out before the end of the first day of the two-day event. The preparation of breads, pastries, and other food for the ever-larger bazaars and festivals would become an increasingly large affair, involving George and Jean Macris' bakery in North Bend, Washington (parishioners would head out days beforehand to help bake hundreds of loaves of tsourekia, a sweet bread), Remo Borracchini's bakery in the Rainier Valley south of downtown, and the kitchens of the Broadway Vocational Institute (now Seattle Central Community College) on Capitol Hill. Matters were somewhat simplified as the church acquired increasingly elaborate kitchens, including several large ovens.

In 1977, the bazaar added an outdoor tent and a broader menu of food (dolmathes, tiropeta, spanakopeta, and souvlakia). Two years later, they began giving gifts of pastries to the neighbors, who were inevitably impacted by the ever-larger event. It became imperative to schedule the bazaar on a weekend when there would be no football game at the University of Washington's nearby Husky Stadium.

The new community center allowed a further expansion of food offerings, with sit-down meals, a Greek delicatessen, complementing the pastries (eventually over 100,000 each year), coffee, and "fair food". Beginning in 1983, the festival—it was now far more than a bazaar—was held even earlier, in September, and transformed into a largely outdoor event utilizing multiple tents (one hosted a taverna), with airplane tickets to Greece as first prize in the raffle. Mayor Charles Royer remarked in 1986 that the Greek festival had become "one of the great assets of the city." The festival continued to grow: once the library was completed in 1988, there were religious books (and, later, secular books on Greece) for sale; demonstrations of icon painting were later added, as were wine tastings, Greek jewelry for sale.

Gross annual profits of the festival are now well into six figures: they passed the $200,000 mark in 1990. The financial benefits to the church and its charitable activities are obvious; while some parishioners hold the opinion that the church should steward its funds more carefully and not need to involve itself in hosting such a large public event, the parish has generally embraced the opportunity to work cooperatively and to expose the broader Seattle community to their form of Christianity.
