= Regents Hill =

Coordinates: 46°44′4″N 117°9′46″W

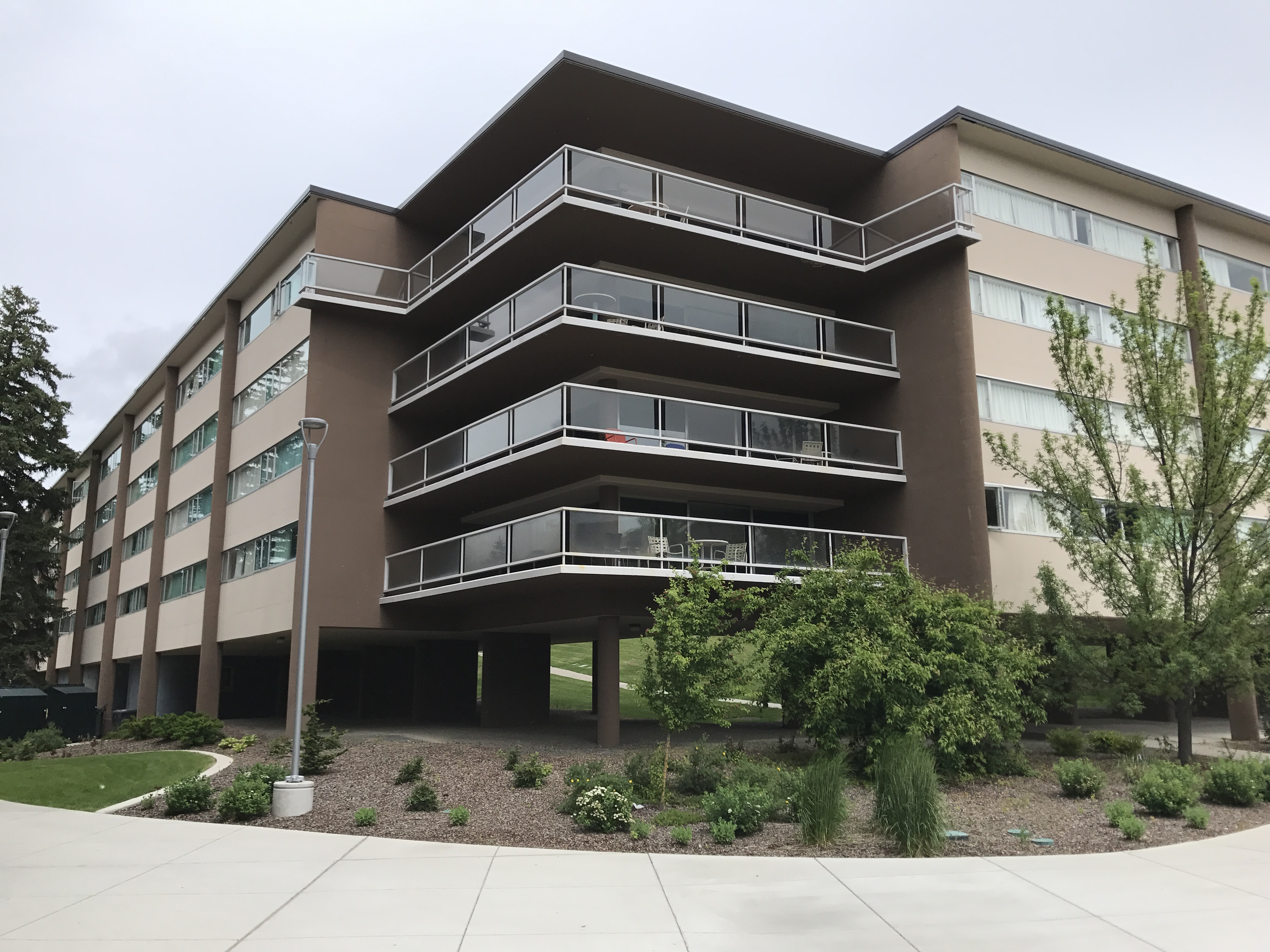
Sun Porches at Regents Hill, May 2017

The Regents Hill residential complex, also known as Regents Hall, is a residence hall located on the main campus of Washington State University in Pullman, Washington. Designed by Paul Thiry and completed in 1952, it was the first International Style building on the Washington State University campus. It is one of the many dormitories on the Washington State University campus available to undergraduates. Variously called "Regents Hall" and the "Regents Hill Halls," the complex (originally named the "New Women's Dormitory" and officially renamed the "Regents Hill Dormitories" on December 4, 1951), consists of two, four-story linked residential wings, McGregor Hall and Barnard Hall, and Stearns Hall—a free-standing dining hall and common space. Together with Scott Coman Hall just to its northwest (completed in 1958), the complex ushered in a new era of campus design featuring large, technologically sophisticated, light-filled concrete buildings for research, teaching, and residential life.

Regents Hill was also the first residential hall built following World War II at what was, in 1952, still called Washington State College (WSC). The college became Washington State University in 1959.

== Design ==
Perched on a hilly rise at the northeastern edge of the campus, the 400-student residence was promoted as a "dream dormitory" for women and may have been the first residential hall in the Pacific Northwest with evident ties to European modernism. However, its interior connections to its local region and its Japanese-infused landscape reveals the building's overall hybridity within an otherwise monolithic postwar architecture palette beginning to take hold around the United States for public and private buildings alike.

Regents Hill includes several notable design features. Connecting the growing college to mainstream trends in European architecture, the principal residential wings of Barnard and McGregor Halls feature an open-air stair-and-balcony tower that joins them at the campus-facing corner, reminiscent of Dutch modernist Jan Duiker's Open Air School in Amsterdam. The wings, too, feature strip windows suggestive of modern machinery and are elevated above the ground level by small reinforced concrete columns, resembling the "pilotis" of Le Corbusier's architectural experiments of the 1920s. Thiry had once met Le Corbusier, and likely would have been aware of his architectural theories.

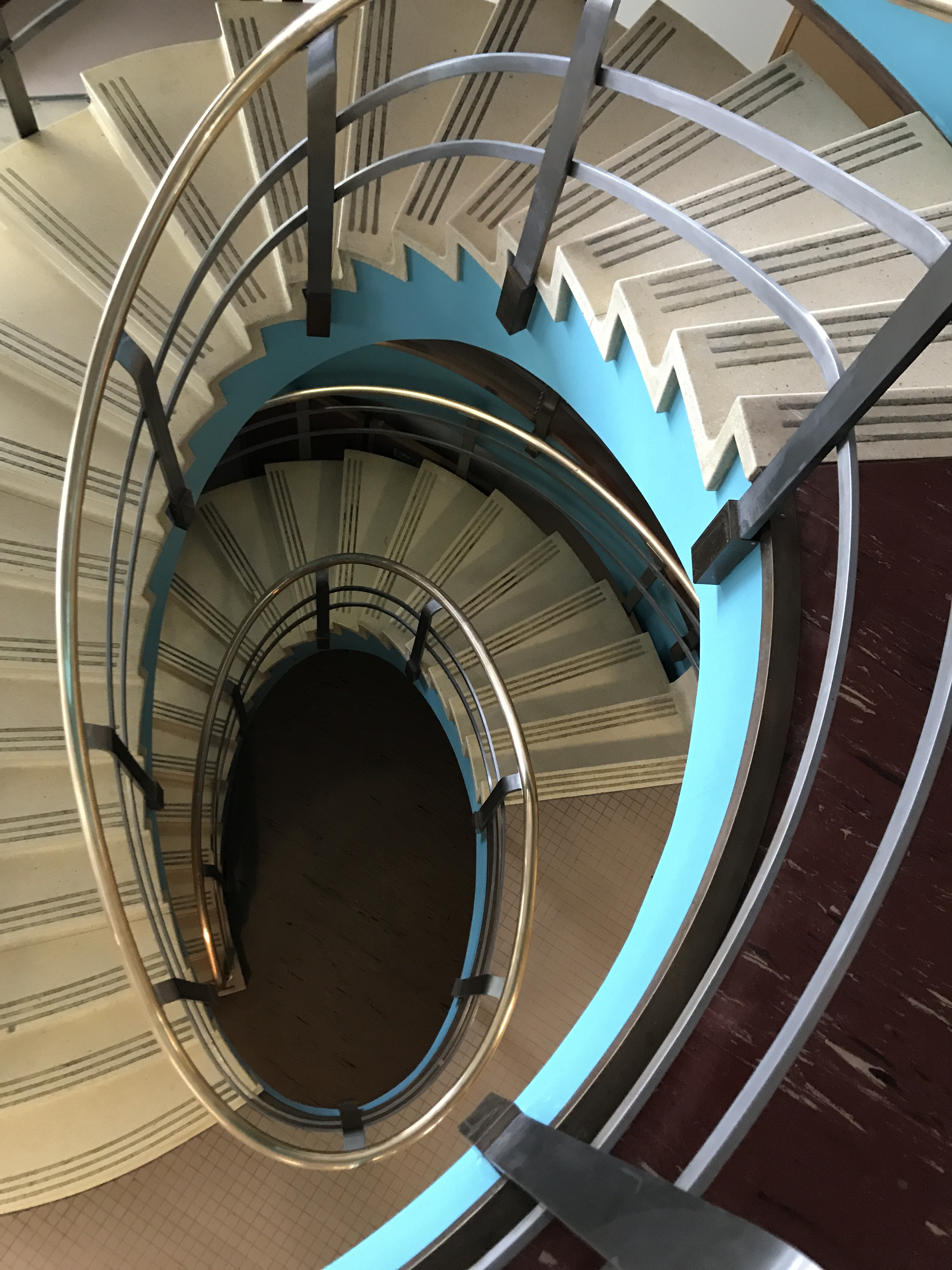
Looking down from the spiral staircase in Stearns Hall at Regents Hill

At the same time, Thiry's design attempted to link the building to local conditions: the lobby of Stearns Hall, for example, features a sculptural spiral staircase, curved walls, and a wavy, stainless steel banister; originally, Stearns included carpets and furniture that Thiry considered "emblematic of the Palouse country" because their wavy designs suggested the rolling hills of the surrounding landscape. An alumni magazine celebrated McGregor Hall and Barnard Hall for their spacious, double rooms with picture windows and floors featuring kitchenettes, laundry units, and an outdoor lounge area (what later became known as the "sun porch") with "flower garden and lawn." The magazine boasted of the building's common sewing and typing rooms and considered the design, overall, to mark a significant advance in campus housing because of its "home and small-group living."

The residential complex, including Scott Coman Hall, was Thiry's first and only work at WSC—or in all of eastern Washington. A noted architect whose residential designs in Seattle were the first to explicitly demonstrate European modernist ideas, Thiry would cement his legacy with his role as principal architect of the Century 21 Exposition in Seattle (1962). He also designed the Seattle Center Coliseum—now Climate Pledge Arena—for that exposition.

== Landscape ==
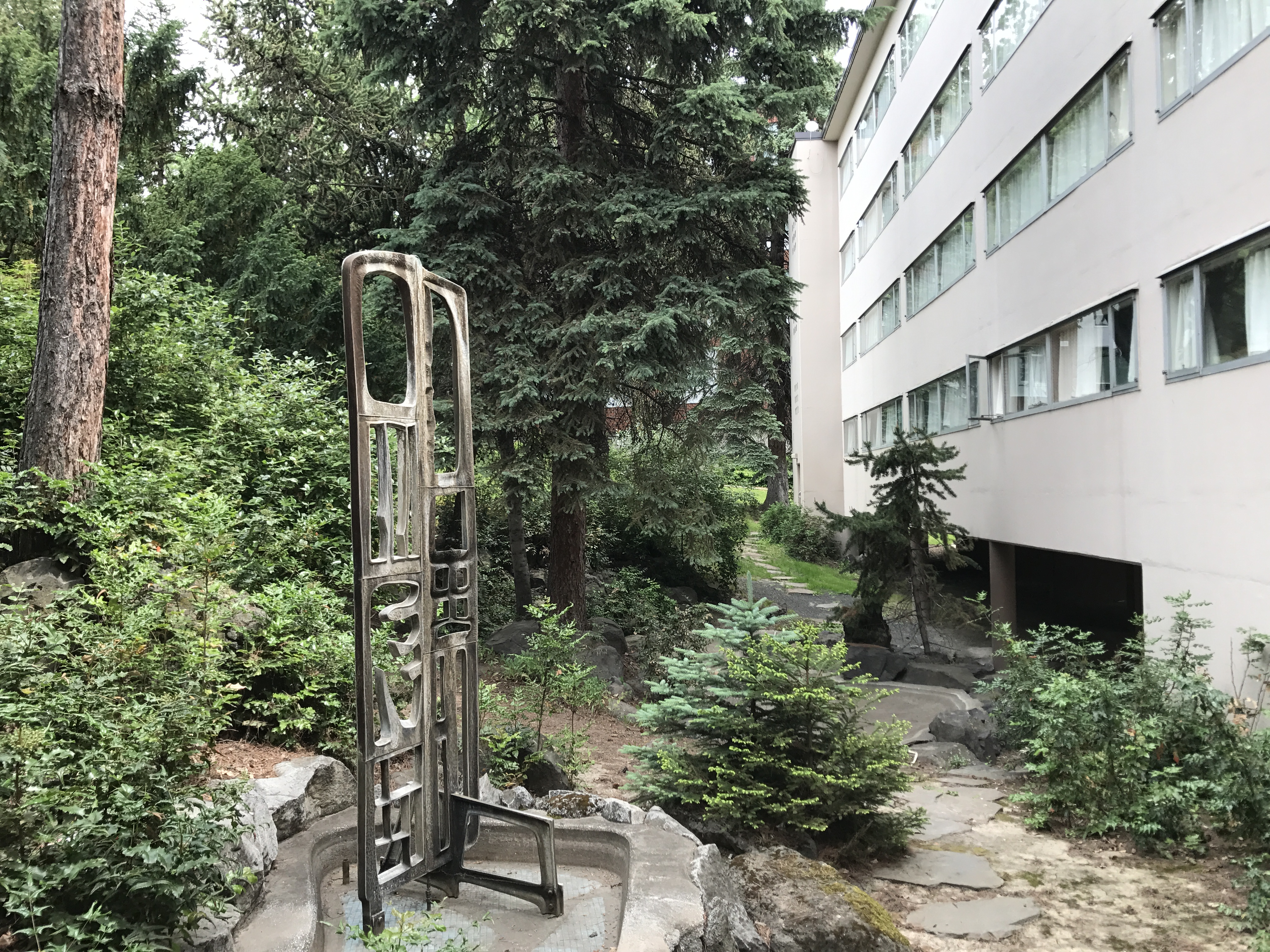
The Japanese garden and sculpture behind McGregor Hall at Regents Hill, as seen in 2017

Regents Hill features the university's only Japanese-influenced garden. Tucked behind McGregor Hall on a slope, a small, informal landscape of trees, shrubs, moss, stone pathways, and a small pond suggests the architect's travels to Asia in 1934 and his awareness of the Japanese work of Czech-American architect Antonin Raymond. An open, metal sculpture, built with the original design, still stands and adds to the overall effect. Several large rocks are scattered loosely about the landscape, yet their seemingly random placement might have been intentional to reveal the connections between eastern and western cultures; broadly suggestive of Washington state's geography on the Pacific Rim. The design's relationship to the landscape as a whole—from its sensitive relationship to the ground (by raising it up on stilts) to its expansive windows permitting views from its hilly site—earned it a place among Architectural Forum's five best college buildings in 1951.

== Other reading ==
- Frykman, George A. Creating the People's University: Washington State University, 1890-1990. Pullman, WA: Washington State University Press, 1990.
- Gonzalez, J. Misha. "A Laboratory for Gracious Living." Honors Thesis. Washington State University, 2013.
- Stimson, William L. Going to Washington State: A Century of Student Life. Pullman, WA: Washington State University Press, 1989.
