= Paul Thiry (architect) =

American architect

- Born: 1904; Nome, District of Alaska, U.S.
- Died: 27 June 1993 (aged 88–89)
- Education: University of Washington College of Built Environments; École des Beaux-Arts
- Occupation: Architect

Paul Thiry (1904–1993) was an American architect most active in Washington state, known as one of the first to bring architectural modernism to the Pacific Northwest. Thiry designed "some of the best period buildings around the state of Washington during the 1950, 60s and 70s."

== Life ==
Thiry was born in Nome, Alaska, of French parents. He was a 1928 graduate of the architecture school at the University of Washington and studied at the École des Beaux-Arts in France. He traveled in Europe and met Le Corbusier, before returning to Seattle in 1935. He also traveled to and worked in Japan.

Thiry designed his own house upon his return but had few commissions in the 1930s. Those he built "showed a clear understanding of the European International Style in his use of spare, geometric forms, clean lines, and new building technologies."

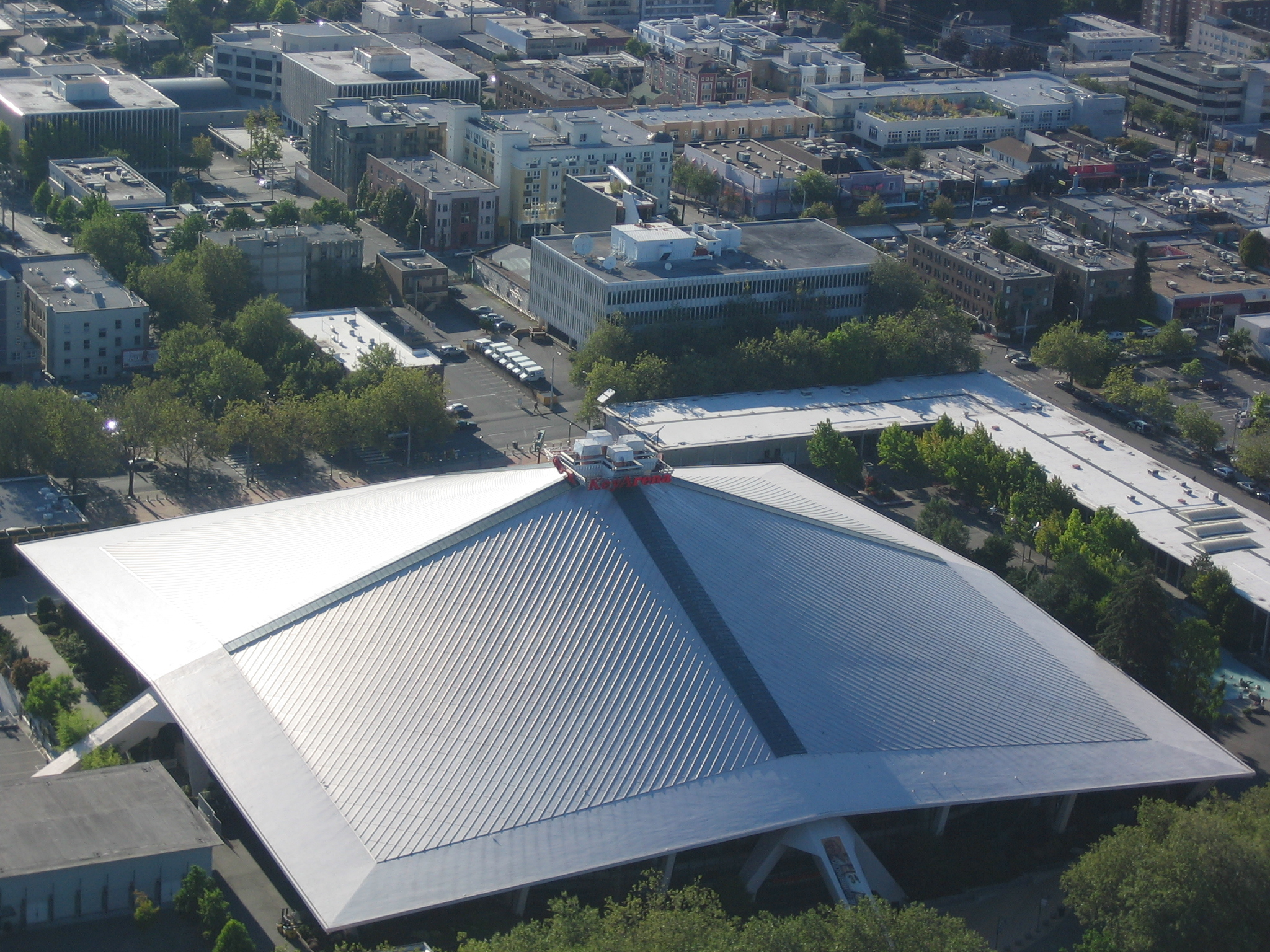
Aerial view of the Climate Pledge Arena, built originally as the Washington State Pavilion for the Century 21 Exposition.

Thiry came to national attention in 1937 with a cement-based stuccoed residence for a manager at Portland Cement, Frank J. Barrett. The innovative house was published in The Modern House in America in 1940: the garage and house formed two rectangles, with a "smooth, undecorated exterior", its doors and windows flush with the surface. Steel window frames were painted blue-green, and glass-brick was used around the entry and along the walls of the partly sunken living room.

Thiry served as supervising architect for the Seattle World's Fair, responsible for the overall plan and coordinating the work of contributors like John Graham Jr. (for the Space Needle), Minoru Yamasaki, and the landscape architect Lawrence Halprin. Thiry's own designs for the fair included the Washington State Pavilion, which later became the KeyArena and is today the Climate Pledge Arena.

Thiry has been compared to other modernists in the Northwest such as Pietro Belluschi (1899–1994) and John Yeon (1910–1994). Thiry is quoted as having said that "Buildings should be good neighbors." He is credited with being "instrumental" to introducing International Style architecture in Seattle.

== Lewis and Clark College ==
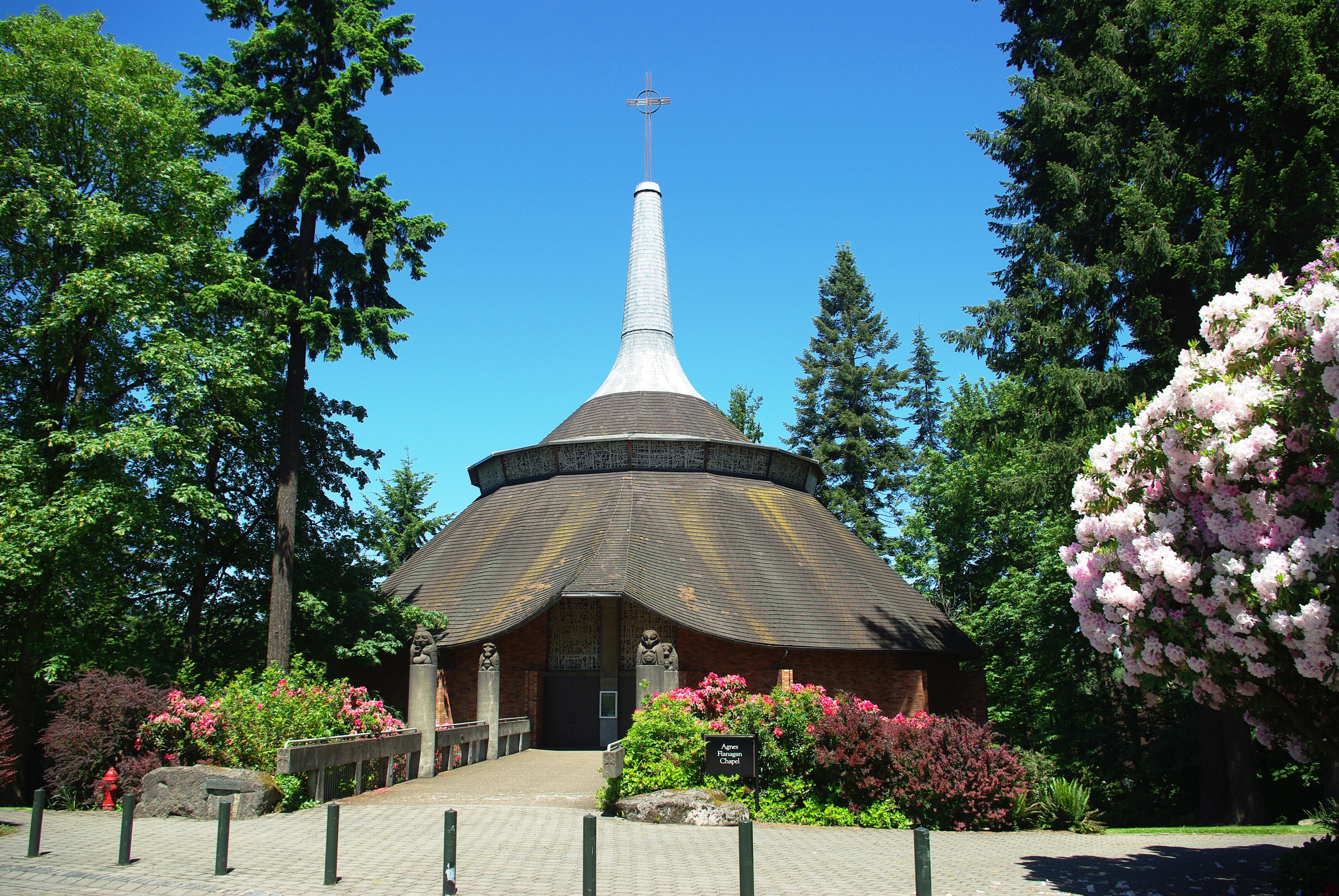
The Agnes Flanagan Chapel on the Lewis and Clark College campus, the site of various religious services and weddings

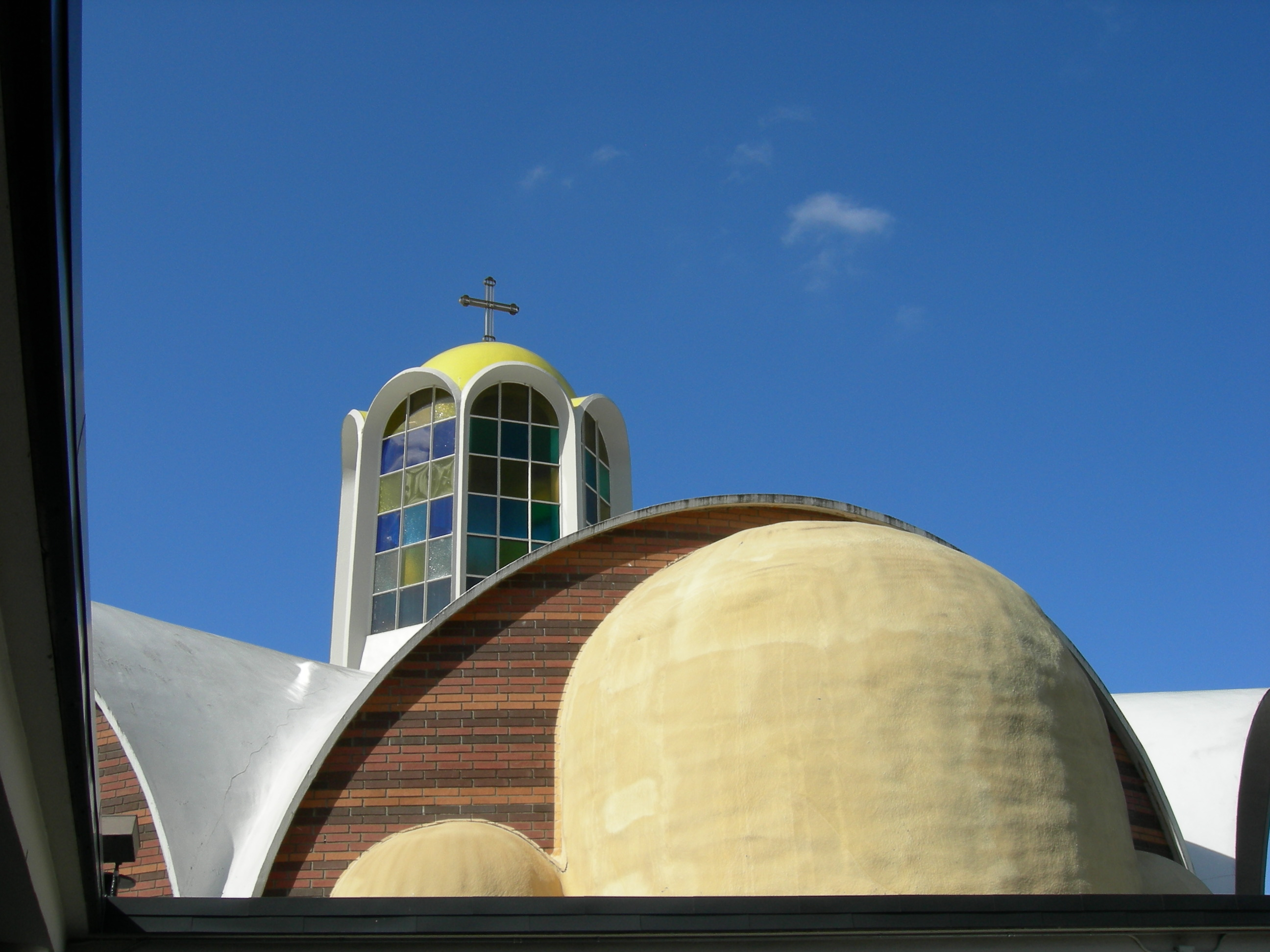
St. Demetrios Greek Orthodox Church, 1964–1968, Seattle, Washington

Thiry designed the Agnes Flanagan Chapel, the Aubrey Watzek Library, and the Biology-Psychology Building at Lewis and Clark College in Portland, Oregon.

The Flanagan chapel is "a creatively designed 16-sided structure" with an 85-rank Casavant Frères organ and seating for 600 people. According to the Lewis and Clark website the building "serves as a meeting place for lectures, musical performances, and religious services. The entry is a bridge flanked by Northwest Coast Indian-style statues depicting the four evangelists (Matthew, Mark, Luke, and John) created by the artist Lelooska, Don Morse Smith.

== Projects ==
- Apartment building, 2717 Franklin Avenue E, Seattle, WA (1929)
- Paul Thiry residence, 330 35th Avenue E, Seattle, WA (1935–1936)
- Frank J. Barrett residence (1937)
- Nichols House, 1600 Boston Terrace E, Seattle, WA (1939)
- Thiry architectural office, 800 Columbia Street, Seattle, WA (1946)
- Electrical Engineering Building, University of Washington, Seattle, WA (1948)
- Museum of History and Industry (MOHAI) (1952) at 2700 24th Avenue East in Seattle, Washington
- Northeast Branch Library, 6801 35th Avenue NE, Seattle, WA (1954)
- Regents Hill (originally "New Women's Dormitory"), Washington State University, Pullman, Washington (1952)
- Frye Art Museum (1952) at 704 Terry Avenue in Seattle (later remodeled and expanded)
- Washington State Library, Olympia, Washington, (1959)
- Western Washington University campus plan, Bellingham, WA (1959-1963)
- U.S. Embassy Residence, Santiago, Chile, (1961)
- Nalley's Fine Food pavilion (1961)
- Supervising architect for Seattle's Century 21 Exposition, along with his own design for the Washington State Pavilion, now the Climate Pledge Arena (1961)
- St. Demetrios Greek Orthodox Church, Seattle, WA (1964)
- Delta Upsilon chapter house, Washington Chapter, Seattle, Washington (1967).
- Watzek Library (1968) and the Agnes Flanagan Chapel (1969) at Lewis and Clark College in Portland, Oregon
- Concrete sanctuary addition to the North Slope section, Christ Episcopal Church, Tacoma, Washington (1970)
- Consulting architect for the Libby Dam project, Libby, Montana (1975)

== Bibliography ==
- Churches and Temples with Richard Bennett and Henry Kamphoefner, Rheinhold Publishing, 1953
