= List of public art in Portland, Oregon =

Portland, Oregon, has an extensive public art collection. Displayed artworks undergo an approval process. Many of the artworks are administered by the Regional Arts & Culture Council.

Several statues were toppled during the 2020s, including ones depicting Thomas Jefferson, George Washington, Abraham Lincoln, and Teddy Roosevelt. The Promised Land, the Thompson Elk Fountain, and a statue of Harvey W. Scott were also removed.

== Mosaics, murals, and paintings ==
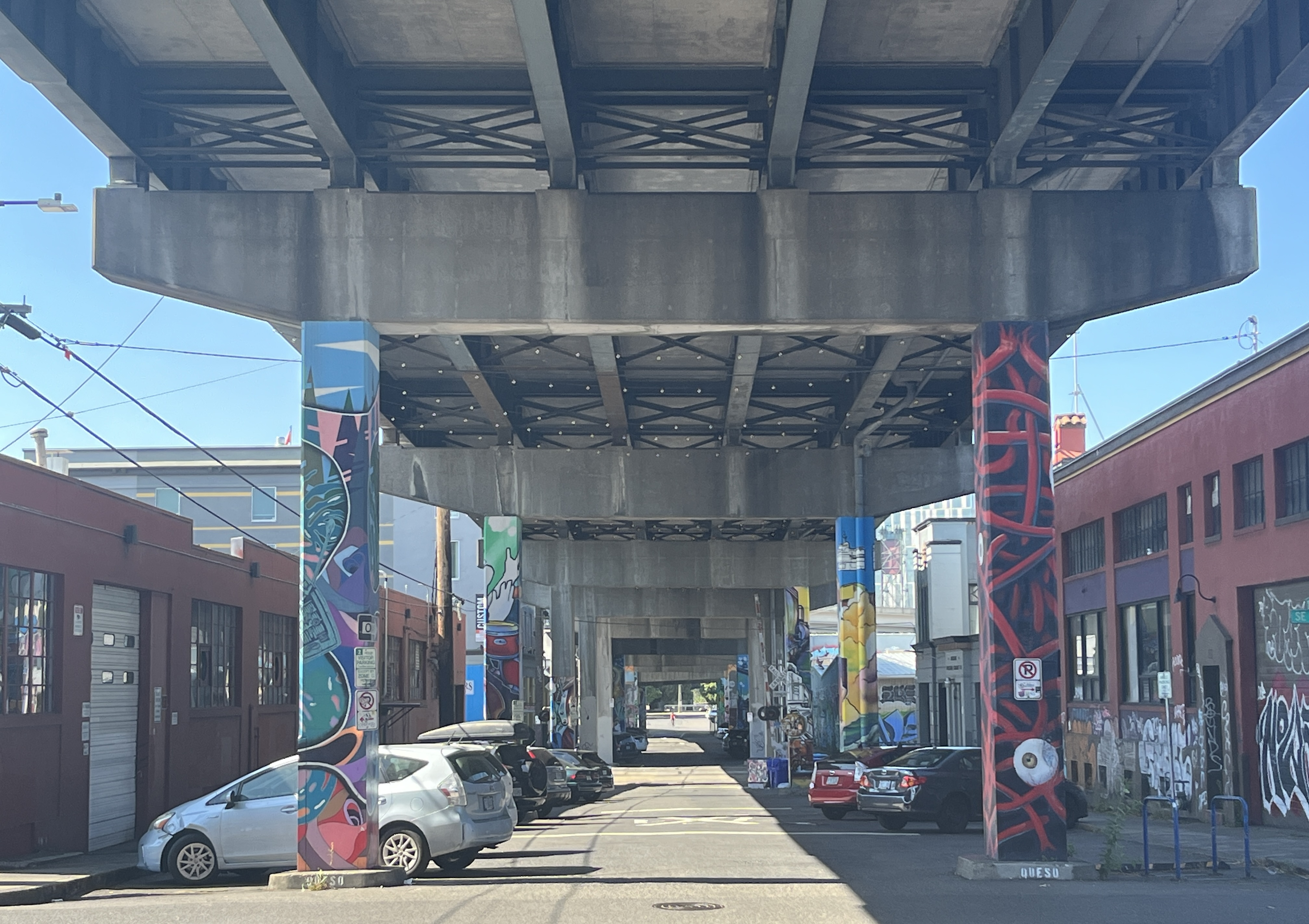
Avenue of Murals

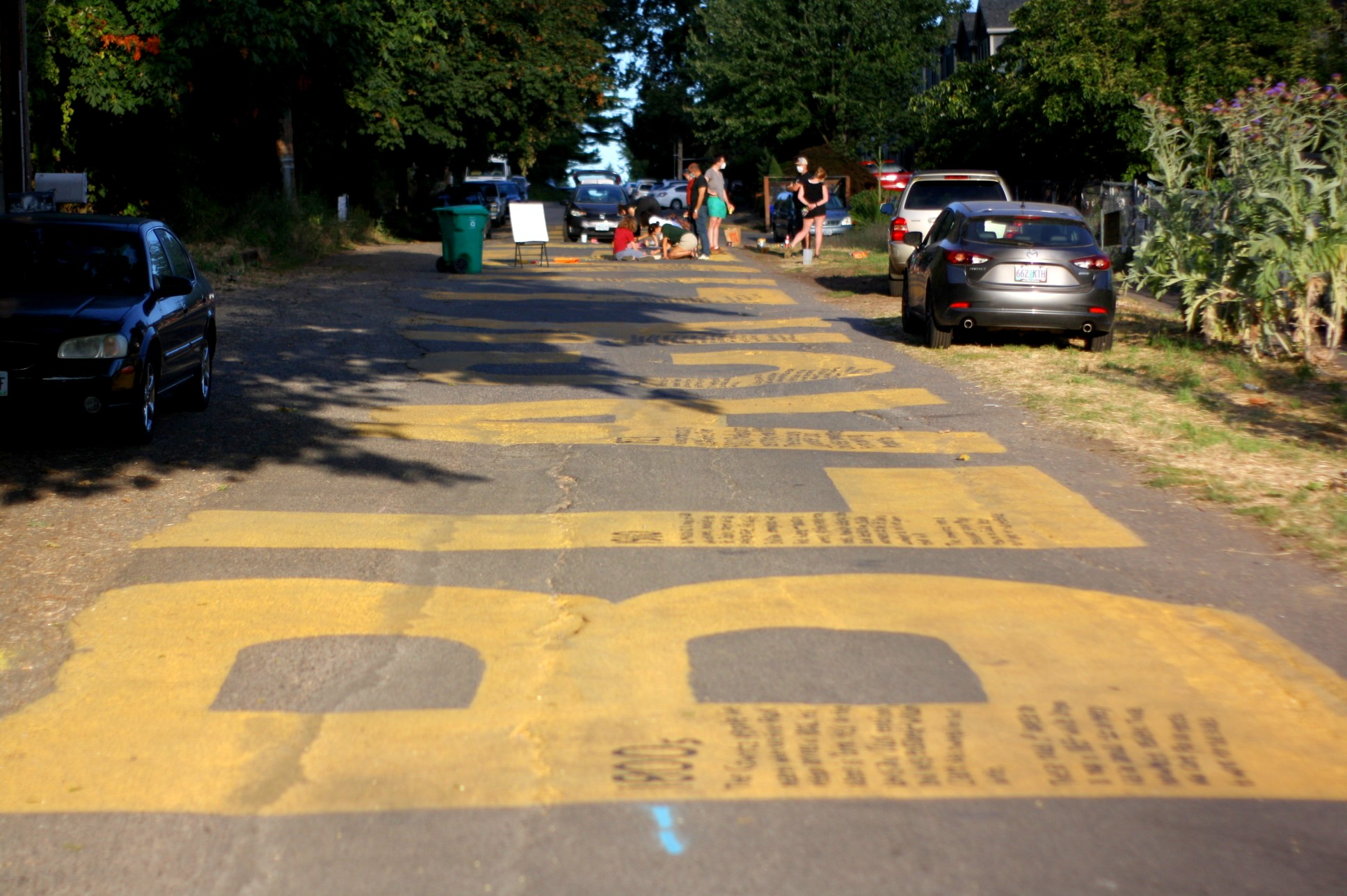
Black Lives Matter street mural (2020)

Mosaics, mural, and paintings have included:

- Art Fills the Void (1982)
- Avenue of Murals
- Bill Papas's mural of Portland, Oregon
- Black Lives Matter street mural (2020)
- Capax Infiniti (2014), Faith47
- Conduit (2009–2010), Emily Ginsburg
- George Floyd mural (2020)
- Lovejoy Columns
- Never Ending / Endless (2021), Fatma Al Sharshani
- Never Look Away (2021)
- Oregon History (1989–1990), Richard Haas
- Packy mural (1990, destroyed in 2008), Eric Larsen
- Portland Memorial Mausoleum Mural (2009), Dan Cohen and Shane Bennett
- The Continuity of Life Forms, Willard Martin
- The Knowledge (2010), Harrell Fletcher and Avalon Kalin
- Tri It (2015), Blaine Fontana
- We Stand with You (2021)
- Women Making History in Portland (2007), Robin Corbo
- Woodstock Mural (2013, original, 2015 reproduction), Mike Lawrence

== Sculpture ==
Sculptures have included:

- Garden Wreath (1997), Larry Kirkland, Central Library
- Mago Hermano (Brother Wizard or Magician) (2003), Antoinette Hatfield Hall
- Solar Wreath (1997), Larry Kirkland, Central Library

=== Outdoor sculptures ===
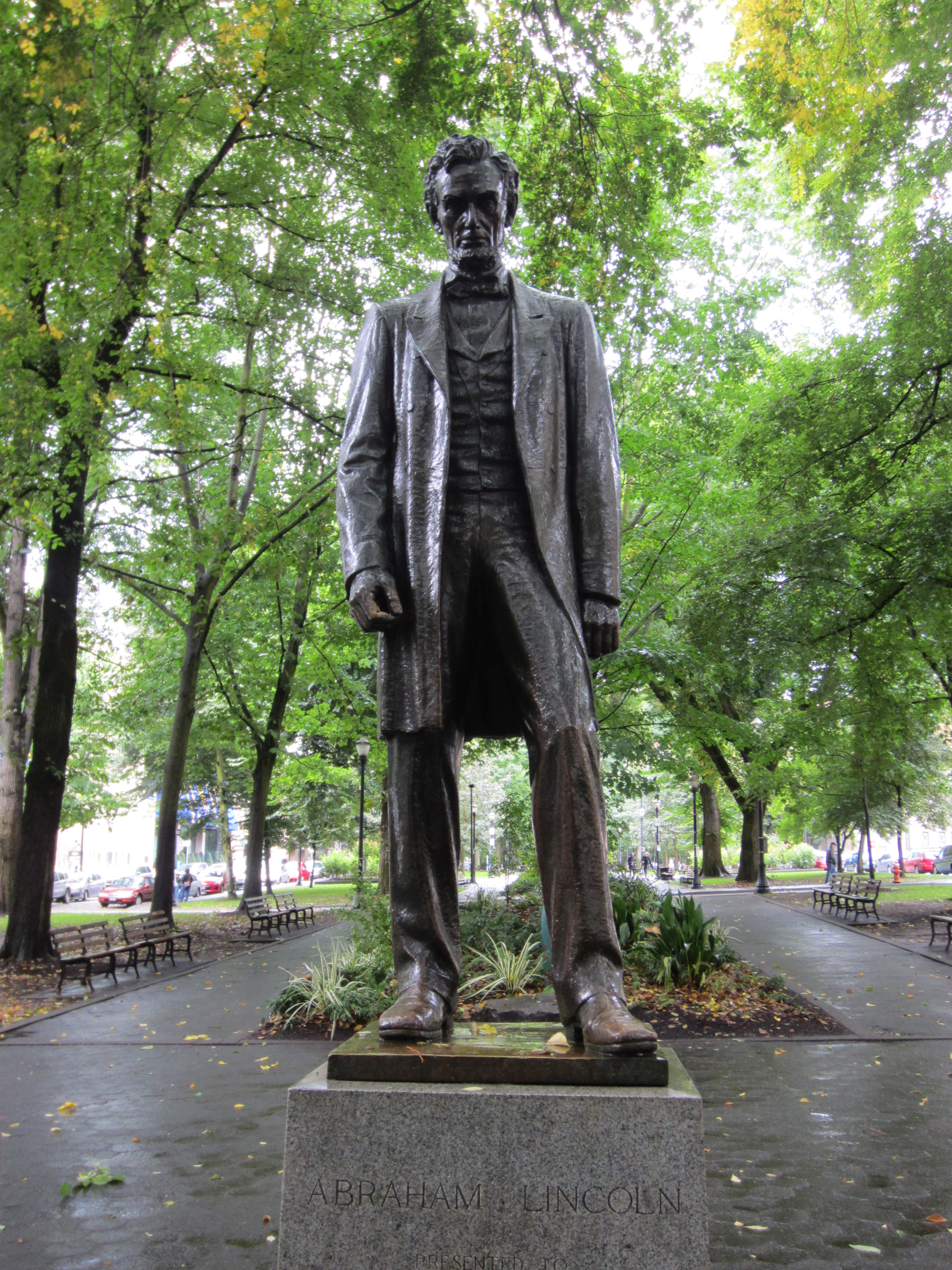
Statue of Abraham Lincoln (1928 — 2020), George Fite Waters

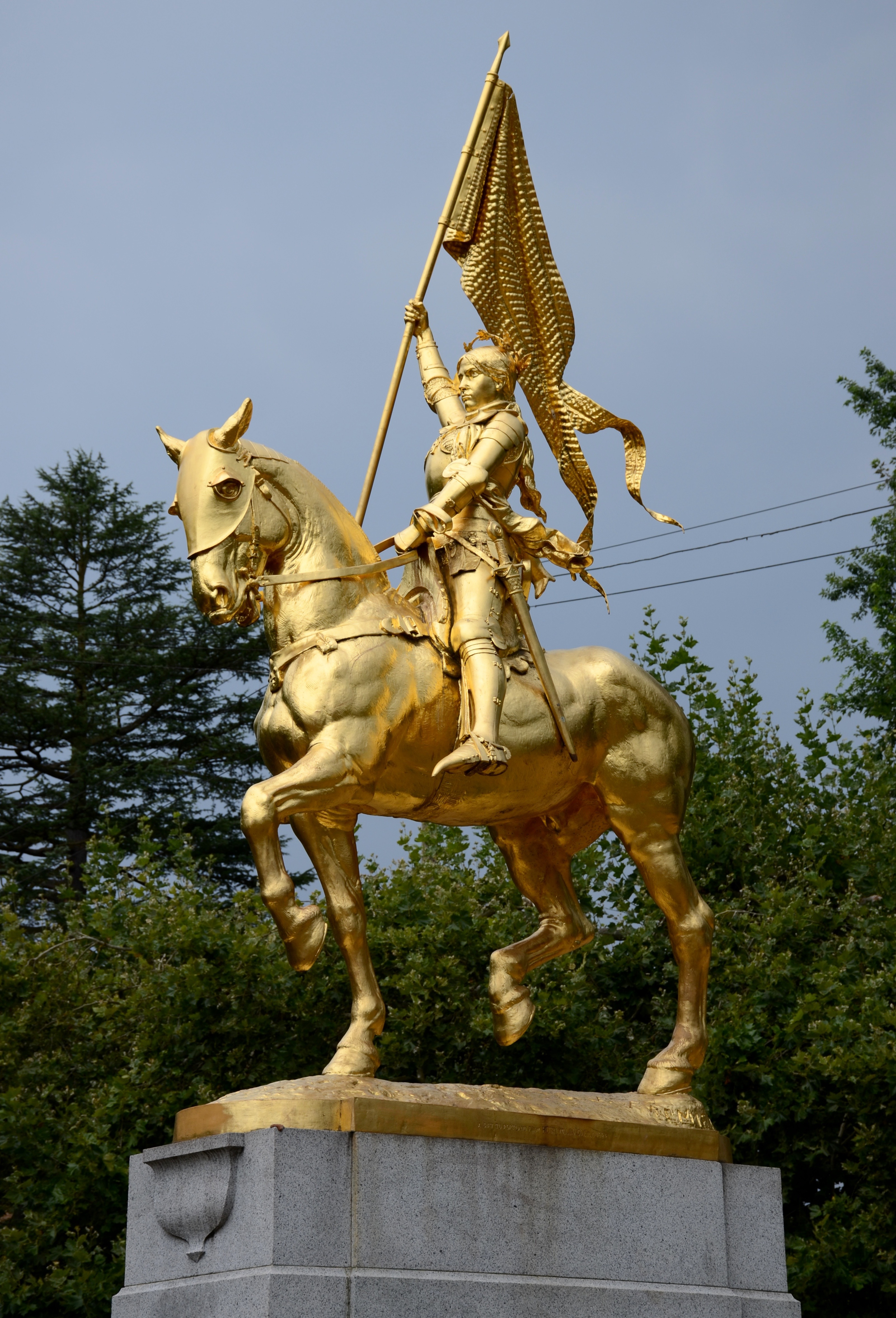
Equestrian statue of Joan of Arc

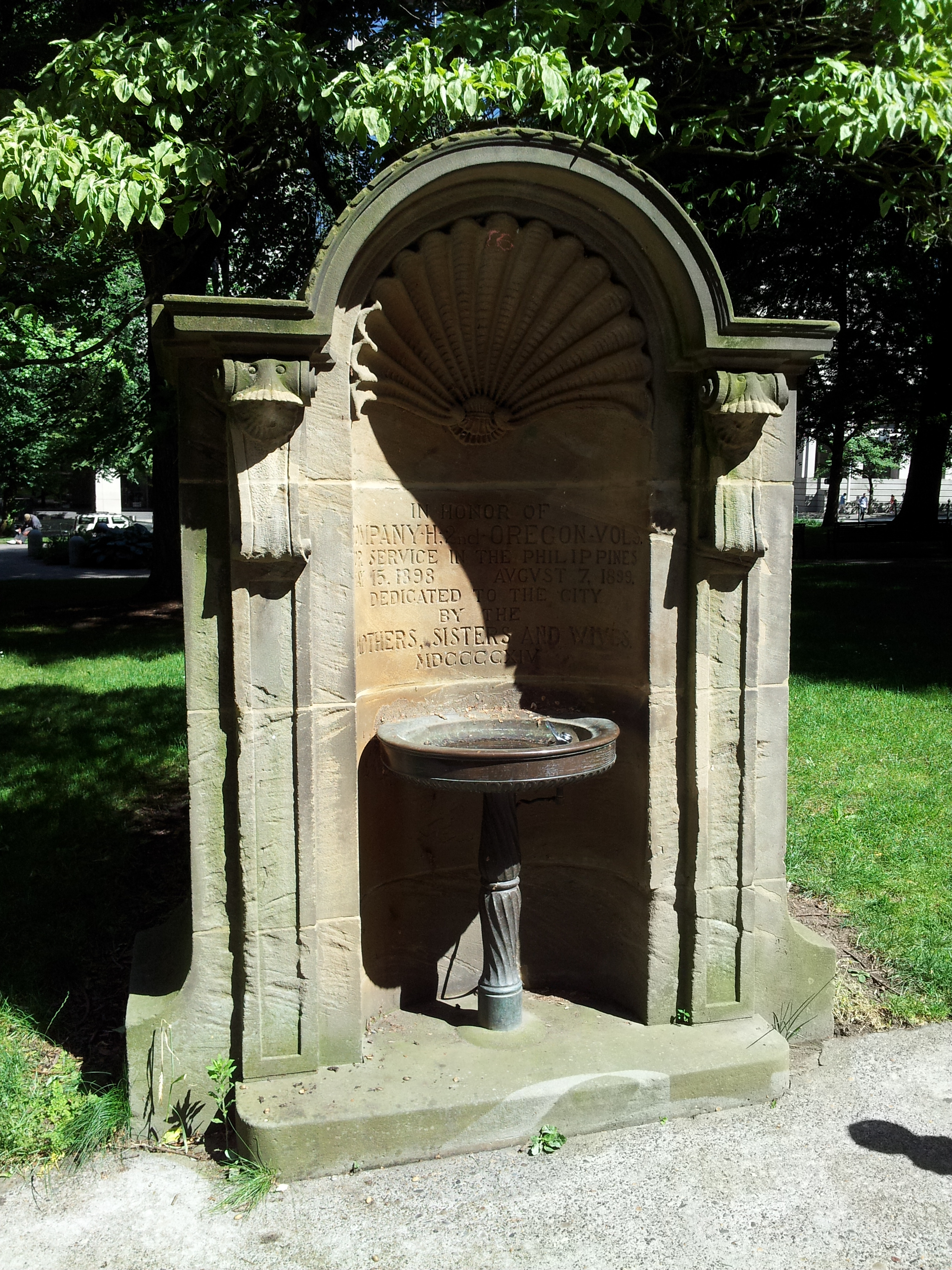
Fountain for Company H

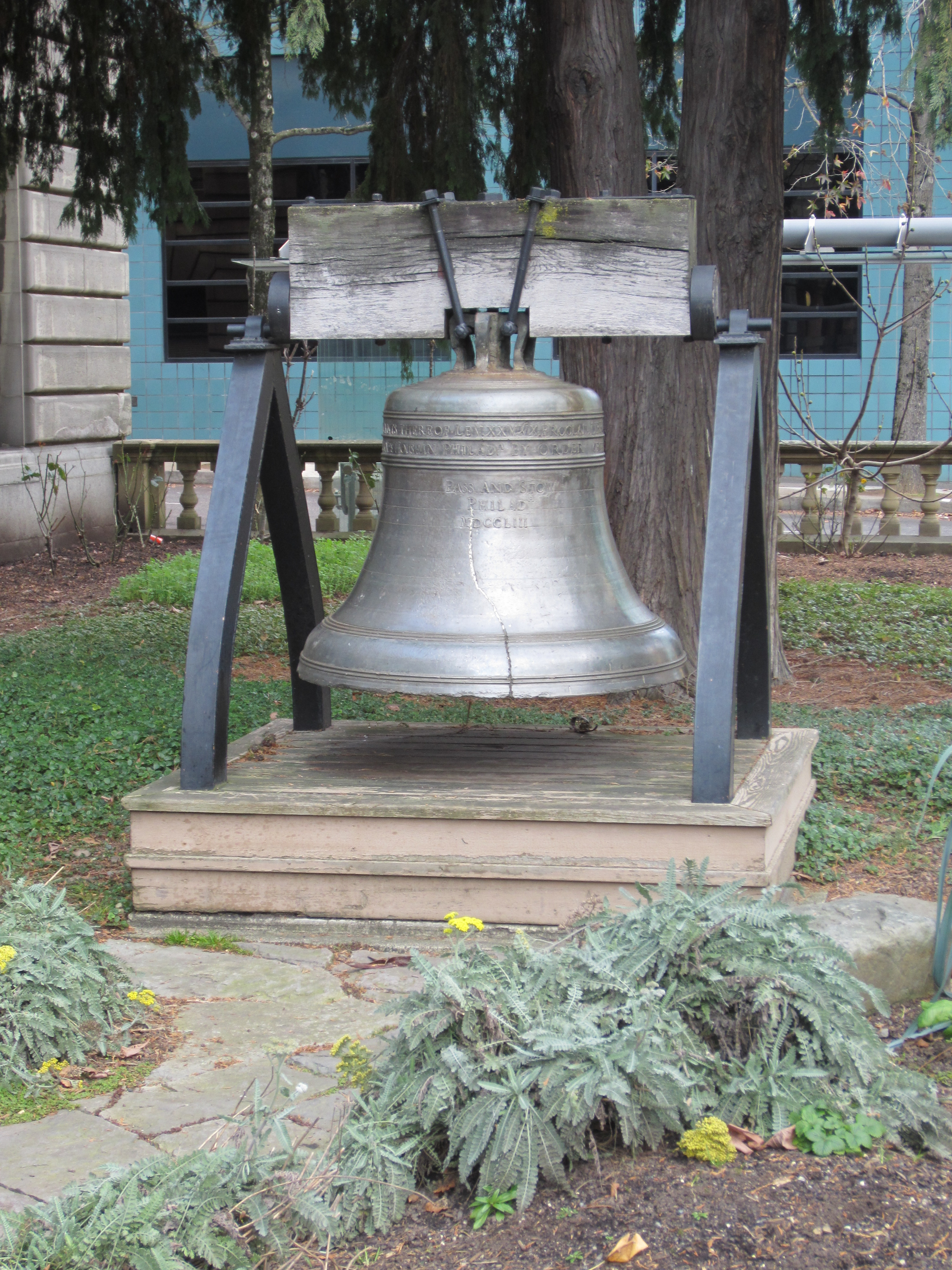
Liberty Bell

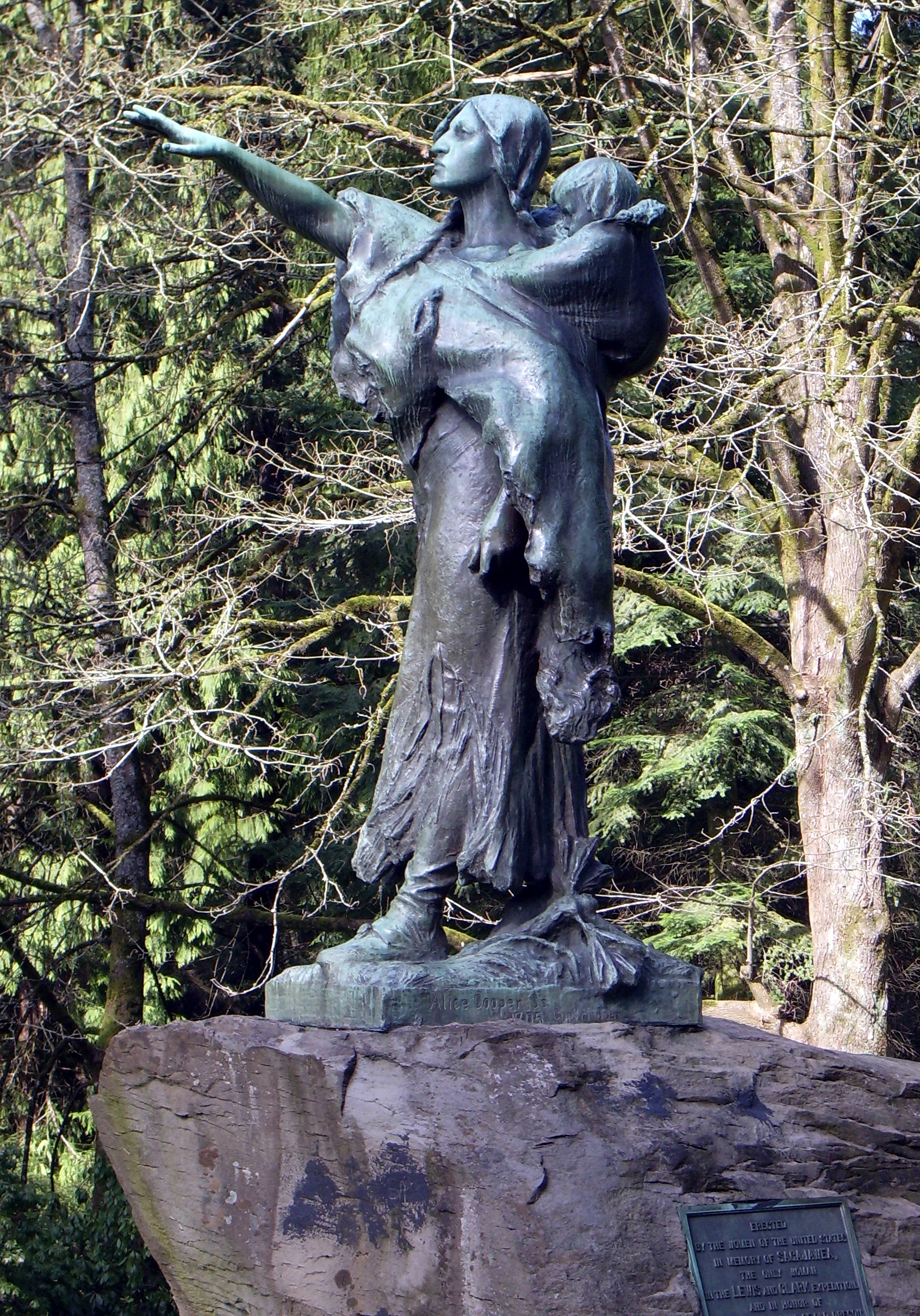
Sacajawea and Jean-Baptiste (1905)

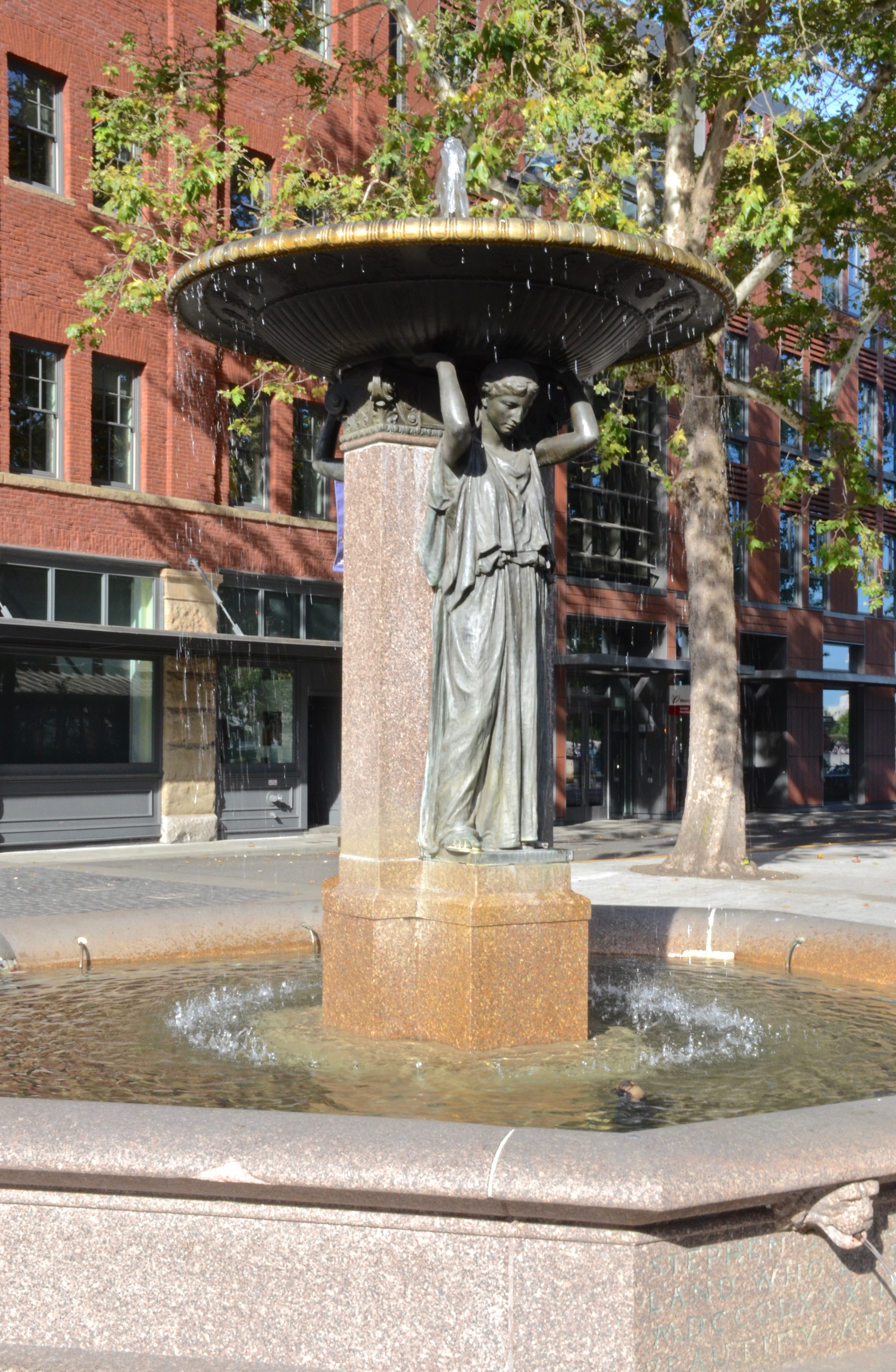
Skidmore Fountain

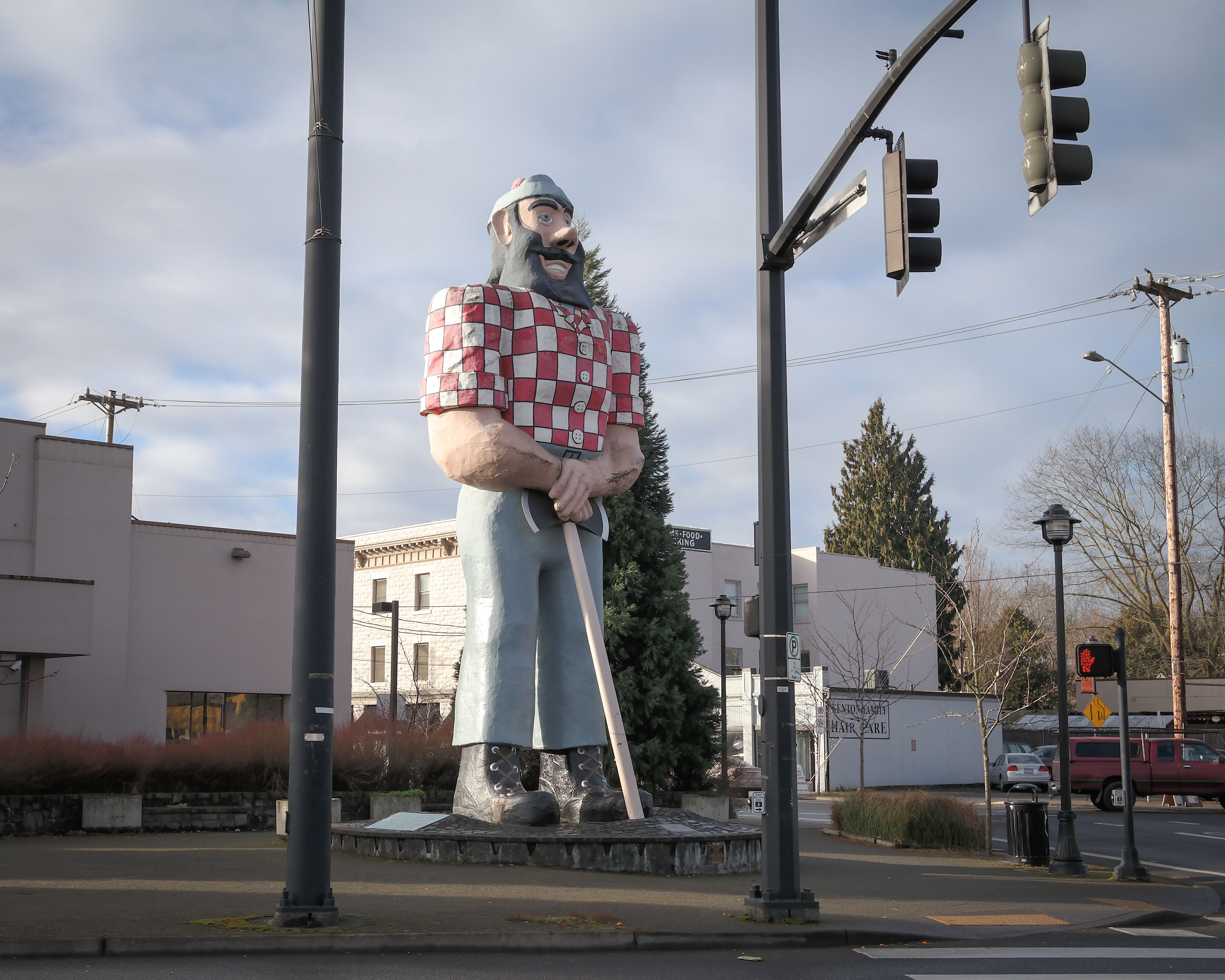
Statue of Paul Bunyan (1959)

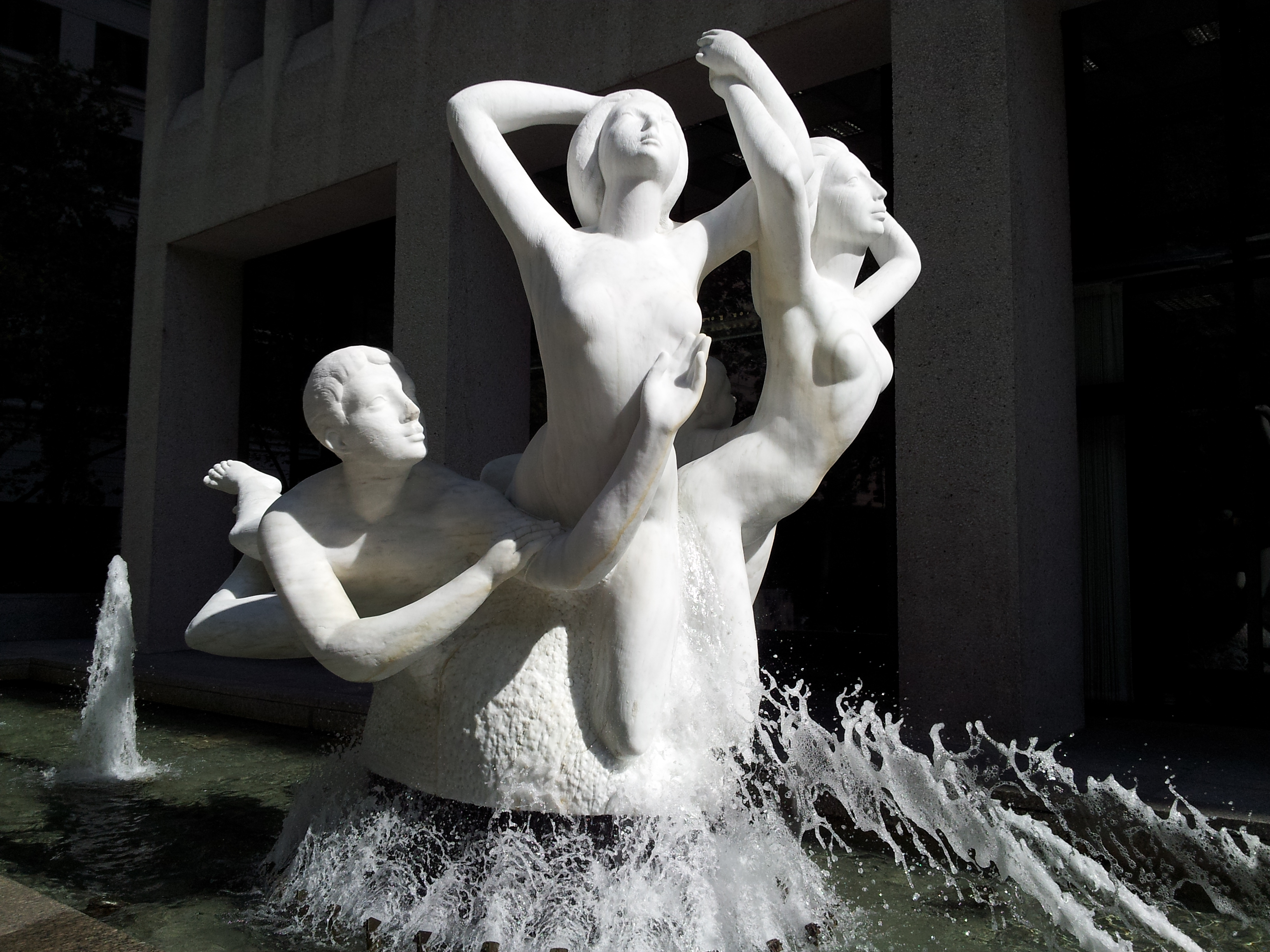
The Quest (1970), Alexander von Svoboda

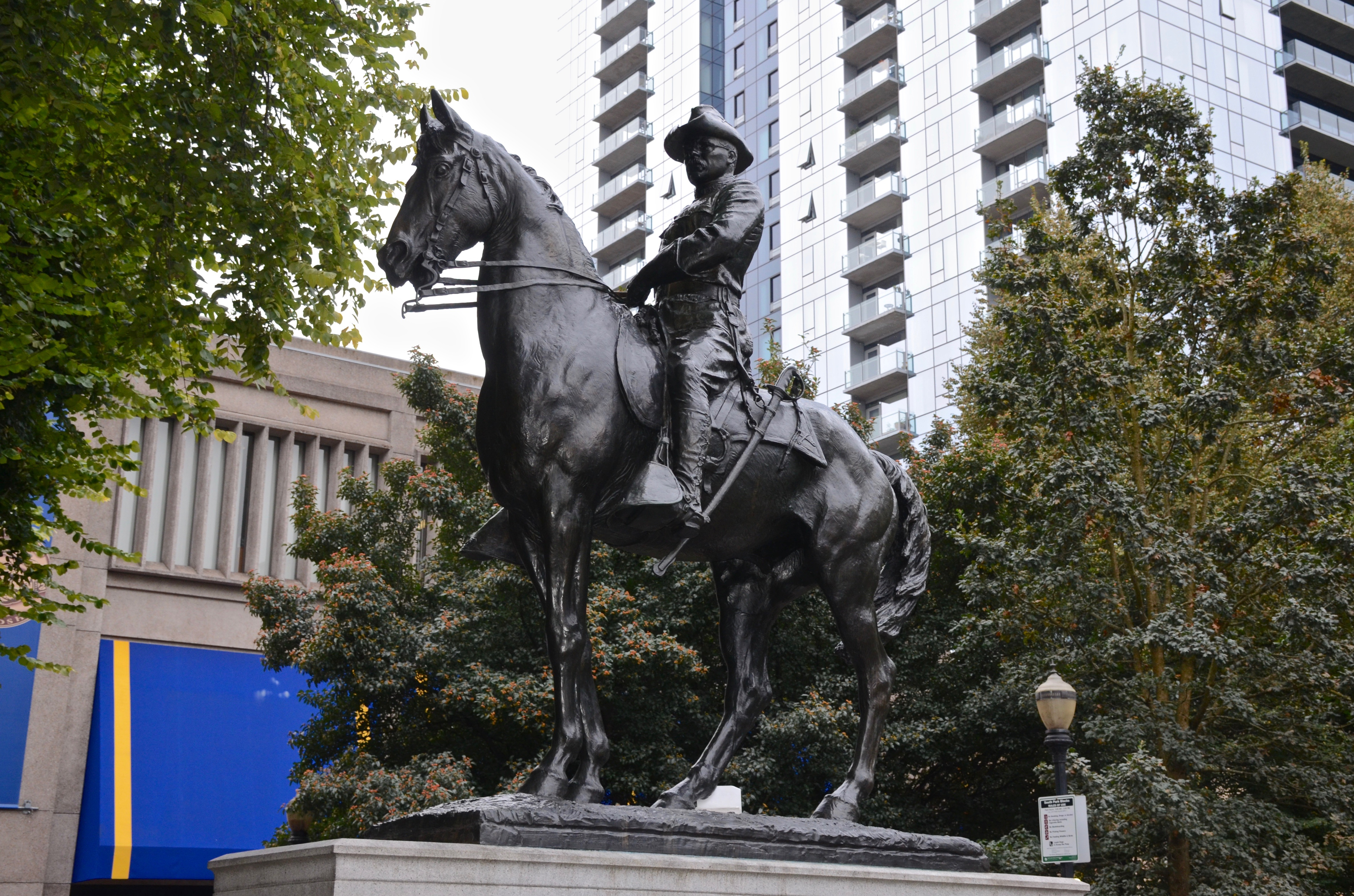
Theodore Roosevelt, Rough Rider (1922), Alexander Phimister Proctor

- 118 Modules (1979), John Rogers
- Ainu and Native American power boards
- Allow Me (1983), John Seward Johnson II
- Alluvial Wall (2001), Peter Nylen
- Along These Lines (2005), Anne Storrs
- Animals in Pools (1986), Georgia Gerber
- Artwall (2005), Herbert Dreiseitl
- Ascension (1996), Robert Calvo
- Awning (1976), Douglas Senft
- Bell Circles II
- Broken Wall Memorial
- Brushstrokes (1996), Roy Lichtenstein
- Burls Will Be Burls (2009), Bruce Conkle
- The Burnside Nest (2014), Hannes Wingate
- Bust of York (2021)
- Cairns (2008), Christine Bourdette
- Capitalism (1991), Larry Kirkland
- Captain William Clark Monument (1988)
- Cat in Repose (1997), Kathleen McCullough (née Conchuratt)
- Chiming Fountain (1891), John "Hans" Staehli
- Chinatown Gateway (1986)
- City Reflections (2009), Patti Warashina
- Coming of the White Man (1904), Hermon Atkins MacNeil
- Constellation (2000), Tad Savinar
- Contact II (1972), Alexander Liberman
- Continuation (2009), Michihiro Kosuge
- Da Tung and Xi'an Bao Bao (2002)
- Daddy Long Legs (2006), Mel Katz
- David Campbell Memorial
- Dog Bowl (2002), William Wegman
- The Dream (1998), Michael Florin Dente
- The Dreamer (1979), Manuel Izquierdo
- Driver's Seat (1994), Don Merkt
- Echo Gate (2001), Ean Eldred
- Electronic Poet (1984), Keith Jellum
- Equestrian statue of Joan of Arc, Emmanuel Frémiet
- Facing the Crowd (2001), Michael Stutz
- Farewell to Orpheus (1968–1973), Frederic Littman
- Festival Lanterns (2006), Brian Goldbloom
- Floribunda (1998), Mark Calderon
- Folly Bollards (1998), Valerie Otani
- Fountain for Company H (1914), John H. Beaver
- Frank E. Beach Memorial Fountain (1975), Lee Kelly
- Friendship Circle (1990), Lee Kelly and Michael Stirling
- From Within Shalom (1984), Steve Gillman
- Ghost Ship (2001), James Harrison
- The Green Man of Portland (2009), Daniel Duford
- Heart Beacon (2013), Blessing Hancock and Joe O'Connell
- Holon (1978–1979, re-carved 2003–2004), Donald Wilson
- Host Analog (1991), Buster Simpson
- Howard's Way (2007), Lee Kelly
- Ideals (1992), Muriel Castanis
- In Honor of a Lifetime of Sexual Assault (2024)
- In the Shadow of the Elm (1984), Paul Sutinen
- Interlocking Forms (1977), Donald Wilson
- Inversion: Plus Minus (2012), Annie Han and Daniel Mihalyo
- John Fitzgerald Kennedy Memorial (1965)
- Kerf (2015), Thomas Sayre
- Korean Temple Bell (1989)
- Kvinneakt (1973–1975), Norman J. Taylor
- Leland I (1975), Lee Kelly and Bonnie Bronson
- Lewis and Clark Memorial Column (1908), Otto Schumann
- Liberty Bell (1963, destroyed in 1970; replaced in 1972)
- Little Prince (1995), Ilan Averbuch
- Loyal B. Stearns Memorial Fountain (1941), A. E. Doyle and Associates
- Memorial Fountain, Skidmore, Owings & Merrill
- Memory 99, Lee Kelly
- Mimir (1980), Keith Jellum
- Nash (1978–1979), Lee Kelly
- Nepenthes (2013), Dan Corson
- O Cruceiro (1986)
- Oddo Memorial
- Oregon Landscape (1962), Thomas Hardy
- Oregon Holocaust Memorial (2004)
- Oregon Irish Famine Memorial
- Passage (2014), Bill Will
- Peace Chant (1984), Steve Gillman
- People's Bike Library of Portland (2009), Brian Borrello and Rankin Renwick
- Perpetuity (1970), Alexander von Svoboda
- Pioneer Woman (1956), Frederic Littman
- Pod (2002), Pete Beeman
- Portland Immigrant Statue (2011), Jim Gion
- Portlandia (1985), Raymond Kaskey
- The Promised Land (1993), David Manuel
- The Quest (1970), Alexander von Svoboda
- The Responsibility of Raising a Child (2004), Rick Bartow
- Ring of Time (1965–1967), Hilda Grossman Morris
- The Rippling Wall (2014), David Franklin
- River Legend (1976), Dimitri Hadzi
- Royal Rosarian (2011), Bill Bane
- Running Horses (1986), Tom Hardy
- Sacajawea and Jean-Baptiste (1905), Alice Cooper
- Salmon Cycle Marker (2005)
- The Scout
- Sculpture Stage (1976), Bruce West
- Shakespeare Memorial (1946)
- Shemanski Fountain (1926), Carl L. Linde, and Rebecca at the Well (1928), Oliver L. Barrett
- Silicon Forest (2003), Brian Borrello
- Silver Dawn (1980), Manuel Izquierdo
- Skidmore Fountain (1888), Olin Levi Warner
- Soaring Stones (1990), John T. Young
- Spanish–American War Soldier's Monument (1906), Douglas Tilden
- Spanish–American War Veterans Memorial
- Stack Stalk (2001), Ean Eldred
- Statue of Abraham Lincoln (1928), George Fite Waters
- Statue of Benjamin Franklin (1942), George Berry
- Statue of George Washington (1926–1927), Pompeo Coppini
- Statue of Harvey W. Scott (1933), Gutzon Borglum
- Statue of Paul Bunyan (1959)
- Statue of Vera Katz (2006), Bill Bane
- Stratum (2016), Mikyoung Kim
- Streetcar Stop for Portland (2013), Jorge Pardo
- Talos No. 2 (1959–1977), James Lee Hansen
- Tecotosh (2005–2006), Ed Carpenter
- Terra Incognita (1995), Ilan Averbuch
- Theodore Roosevelt Memorial (1939)
- Theodore Roosevelt, Rough Rider (1922), Alexander Phimister Proctor
- This All Happened More or Less (2014), Crystal Schenk and Shelby Davis
- Thomas Jefferson (1915), Karl Bitter
- Thompson Elk Fountain (1900), Roland Hinton Perry
- Thor (1977), Melvin Schuler
- Three Figures (1991–1992), Mark Bulwinkle
- Tikitotmoniki Totems (2001), Kenny Scharf
- Transcendence, Keith Jellum
- Tree of Life (1964), Lee Kelly and Bonnie Bronson
- Triad (1980, remade 2003), Evelyn Franz
- Trigger 4 (1979), Lee Kelly
- Trio (2013), Elizabeth Conner
- Unfolding Rhythms (1987), Manuel Izquierdo
- Untitled (1977), John Killmaster
- Untitled (1977), Ivan Morrison
- Untitled (1977), Bruce West
- Upstream Downtown (1992), Gary Hirsch
- Urban Hydrology (2009), Fernanda D'Agostino
- Uroboros (1979), Charles Kibby
- Velosaurus (2015), Horatio Law
- Ventana al Pacifico (1989), Manuel Neri
- Victory Bell
- Voices of Remembrance
- Water, Please (1997), Don Merkt
- We Have Always Lived Here (2015), Greg A. Robinson
- Weather Machine (1988), Omen Design Group Inc.
- Whistlestop for an Organ Teacher (2009), Cris Bruch
- Wind Gate, Hilda Grossman Morris
- Winter Rider No. 2 (2003), James Lee Hansen
- Yankee Champion (1985), Thomas Morandi
- York: Terra Incognita (2010), Alison Saar
- You Are Here (2012), Ron Baron

== See also ==
- Coraline's Curious Cat Trail (2024), temporary art trail
- Culture of Portland, Oregon
- Fathom (art installation)
- Northwest Trolls: Way of the Bird King
- Robot Alley
- Santa Clones
- Wildwood: Follow the Crows
