= Praying Hands =

Praying Hands may refer to:

- Praying Hands (Dürer), a c. 1508 drawing by Albrecht Dürer
- "Praying Hands", a song by Devo from the 1978 album Q: Are We Not Men? A: We Are Devo!
- Healing Hands (statue), also known as the Praying Hands, a 1960 statue by Leonard McMurray on the campus of Oral Roberts University
- Praying Hands Memorial, a 1948 memorial by Frank Gilman on the campus of the University of Portland, forming part of the Broken Wall Memorial
