= Stratum (sculpture) =

Sculpture series in Portland, Oregon

- Stratum Project
- Part of the installation in 2017
- Artist: Mikyoung Kim
- Year: 2016
- Dimensions: 4.3 m (14 ft)
- Location: Portland, Oregon, United States
- 45°27′51″N 122°39′38″W
- Owner: City of Portland, Oregon

Stratum, also known as the "Stratum Project", is a series of 23 sculptures by landscape architect Mikyoung Kim, installed near Portland, Oregon's Sellwood Bridge, in the United States.

== Description ==
Stratum is a public art installation consisting of 23 multicolored sculptures, or "ecologically inspired geological totems", along the east approach to the Sellwood Bridge in southeast Portland's Sellwood neighborhood. The totems are 14 feet (4.3 m) tall and made of layered recycled materials intended to "create a surface representing earth, water and sky as a gateway to the Sellwood community". They "rotate" at 90-degree angles. According to the Regional Arts & Culture Council, the project's concept was "driven by the power and beauty of the geologic and natural phenomena" of the Willamette Valley. It was funded by the City of Portland's art program. The sculptures are owned by the city and maintained by the Regional Arts & Culture Council.

== History ==
Mikyoung Kim's work was selected by the Regional Arts & Culture Council in 2012. The totems were created by Art & Design Works of Cornelius.

Workers began installing the totems in August 2016, starting on the south side of Southeast Tacoma Street. The remaining sculptures are slated to be installed on the north side of Tacoma Street by the end of 2016.

== See also ==
- 2016 in art
