= Triad (sculpture) =

Sculpture in Portland, Oregon

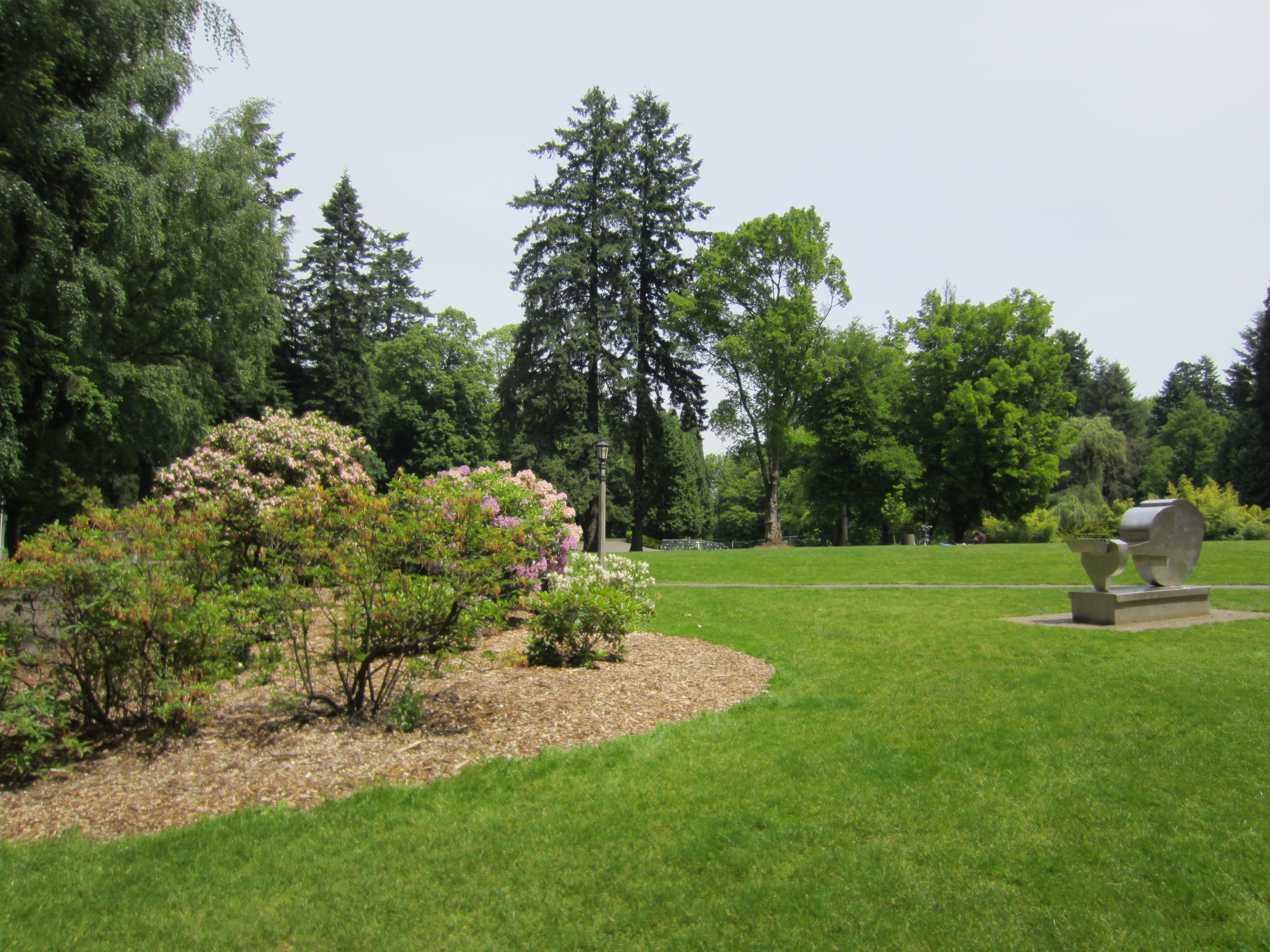
- The sculpture in Laurelhurst Park in May 2012
- Artist: Evelyn Franz
- Year: 1980 (remade 2003)
- Type: Sculpture
- Medium: Stainless steel
- Condition: "Treatment needed" (1994)
- Location: Portland, Oregon, United States; 45.52151°N 122.62649°W
- Owner: City of Portland and Multnomah County Public Art Collection courtesy of the Regional Arts & Culture Council

Triad is an outdoor sculpture by German American artist Evelyn Franz, located in Laurelhurst Park in southeast Portland, Oregon.

== Description and history ==
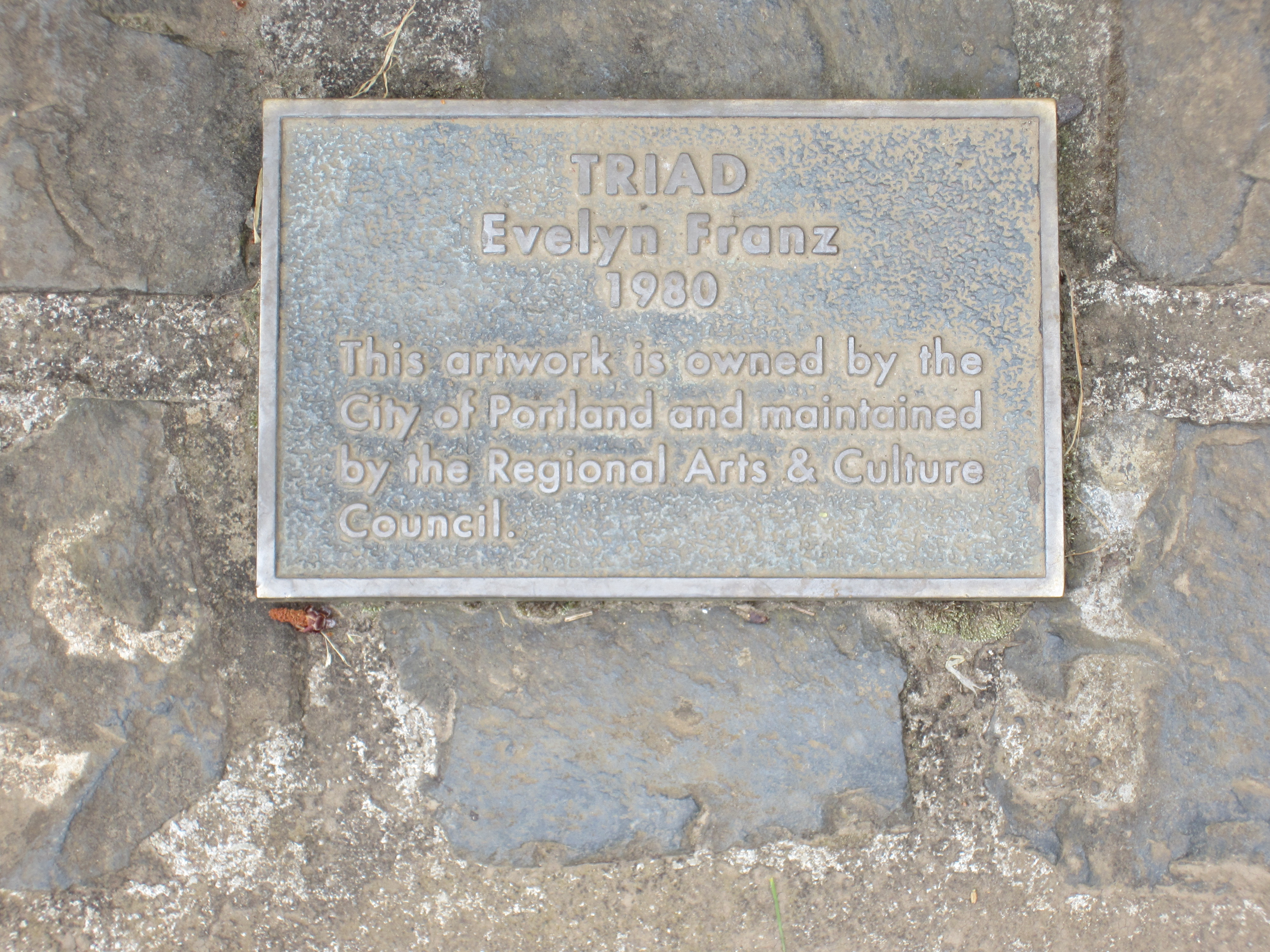
Plaque for the sculpture

Originally completed in 1980 and remade in 2003, Triad was designed by Evelyn Franz, who received her Master of Fine Arts in Sculpture in 1976 from Portland State University. The abstract stainless steel sculpture was funded by the Comprehensive Employment and Training Act (CETA) and is installed between Southeast 37th Avenue and Southeast Ankeny in Laurelhurst Park. According to the Regional Arts & Culture Council, which administers the work, it measures 7 feet (2.1 m), 5 inches (13 cm) tall, 5 feet (1.5 m), 5 inches (13 cm) long and 2 feet (0.61 m), 5 inches (13 cm) wide . The Smithsonian Institution lists the measurements as approximately 50 inches (130 cm) tall, 8 feet (2.4 m) long and 2 feet (0.61 m) wide . The sculpture contains no inscriptions and rests on a stainless steel base which measures approximately 16 inches (41 cm) tall, 80 inches (200 cm) long and 30 inches (76 cm) wide. It is part of the City of Portland and Multnomah County Public Art Collection courtesy of the Regional Arts & Culture Council.

Its condition was deemed "treatment needed" by the Smithsonian's "Save Outdoor Sculpture!" program in November 1994.

== See also ==
- 1980 in art
- 2003 in art
