= This All Happened More or Less =

Sculpture series in Portland, Oregon

- One of the installation's eight bronze statues on a dolomite boulder along Southeast Division Street, 2016
- Artist: Crystal Schenk; Shelby Davis
- Year: 2014
- Type: Sculpture
- Medium: Bronze; dolomite
- Location: Portland, Oregon, United States; 45°30′16.7″N 122°39′17.4″W

This All Happened More or Less is a 2014 outdoor public art installation by Crystal Schenk and Shelby Davis, located along Southeast Division Street in Portland, Oregon, United States.

== Description and history ==
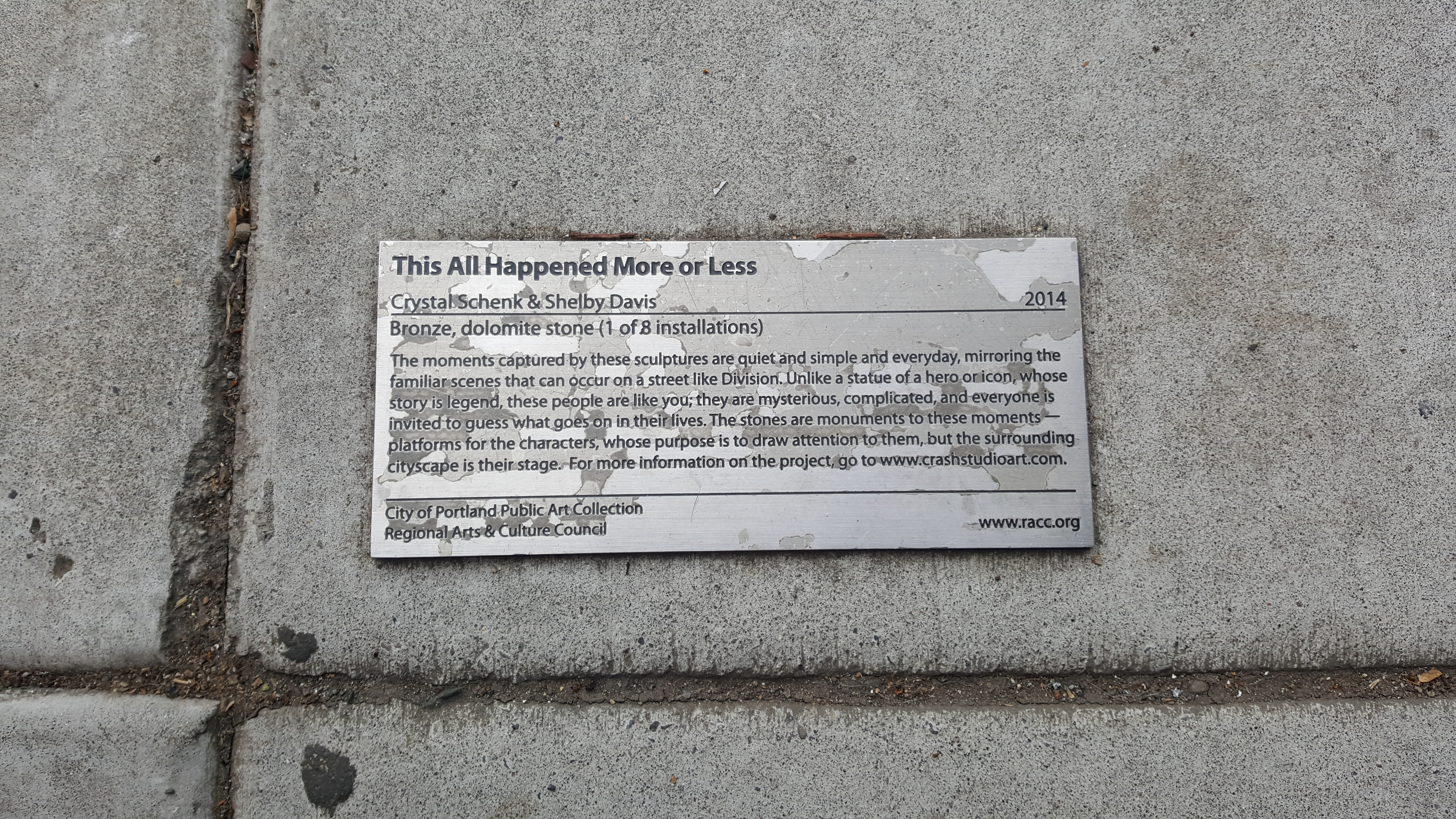
Plaque for the sculpture on Southeast Division Street

This All Happened More or Less is a sculpture installation, and the first public art commission, by local artists Crystal Schenk and Shelby Davis. The work consists of eight small bronze statues, or "characters", on large dolomite boulders quarried in the Pacific Northwest, "strategically" placed along Southeast Division Street, between 11th and 36th Avenues. The stones are sited adjacent to bioswales and near businesses. Schenk and Davis based the statues on the activities they observed on Southeast Division, and hoped pedestrians would "take their time to stroll along the street and discover all of the sculptures". The artists have said, "We are merely suggesting stories and we want people to draw their own conclusions, to fill in all of the details, and to follow their imaginations." According to the Regional Arts & Culture Council, which administers the installation, the work "can draw a viewer in close enough to imagine a story behind each of the figures that vary from active, such as a kid on a skateboard, to inactive, such as waiting for a bus or sitting quietly with a pet dog."

This All Happened More or Less was installed with other streetscape improvements along Southeast Division and funded by the city's 2% for Art program. The installation was commemorated at Openfest on October 24, 2014.

== Reception ==
In 2015, the work was one of three 2014 public art projects in the city, and 31 in the United States, recognized by Americans for the Arts as among the best in the country.

== See also ==
- 2014 in art
