= Bill Papas's mural of Portland, Oregon =

1990s painting depicting prominent people of Portland, Oregon, U.S.

- Artist: Bill Papas
- Medium: Watercolor painting
- Dimensions: 2.6 m × 1.4 m (8.5 ft × 4.5 ft)
- Location: Portland, Oregon, U.S.

Bill Papas's mural of Portland, Oregon depicts more than 50 prominent residents of the city during the 1990s. The watercolor painting was displayed at a restaurant in the Hilton Portland Hotel from 1995 to 2014. It was donated to the Oregon Historical Society when the hotel and restaurant were redesigned. The Oregon Historical Society Museum exhibited the work in early 2015, and again for one month in 2018. People depicted in the mural include Stephen Bollenbach, Gert Boyle, James DePreist, Sho Dozono, Jack Faust, Peggy Fowler, Neil Goldschmidt, Mark Hatfield, Barron Hilton, Vera Katz, John Kitzhaber, Phil Knight, Robert B. Pamplin, Arlene Schnitzer, Fred Stickel, and Charles Swindells.

== Description ==
The watercolor painting measures 8.5 feet (2.6 m) by 4.5 feet (1.4 m) and depicts 54 prominent residents of the city during the 1990s, and who "have played roles in modern Portland". The Oregonian's Douglas Perry described the mural as "Portland's own version of the Sgt. Pepper's Lonely Hearts Club Band LP cover". People painted in the mural include:

- Shirley Berselli
- Mary Bishop
- Owen Blank
- Stephen Bollenbach
- Gwyneth Booth
- Gert Boyle
- James DePreist
- Sho Dozono
- Serge D'Rovencourt
- John Eskildsen
- Jack Faust
- Peggy Fowler
- Gerry Frank
- Stan Geffen
- Neil Goldschmidt
- Joseph Ha
- Antoinette Hatfield
- Mark Hatfield
- Barron Hilton
- Dieter Huckestein
- Jerry Hulsman
- Brad Hutton
- Roy Jay
- Vera Katz
- Ruth Keller
- John Kitzhaber
- Sharon LaCroix Kitzhaber
- Phil Knight
- Peter Kohler
- Bud Lindstrand
- Hillman Lueddemann Jr.
- Melvin "Pete" Mark Jr.
- Michael Maslowsky
- Carol McCall
- Diane McCall
- Larry Ogg
- Robert B. Pamplin
- Ron Ragen
- Dick Reiten
- Bob Ridgley
- Paul Romain
- Hilmar Rosenast
- Jim Rudd
- Arlene Schnitzer
- Ethel Simon-McWilliams
- Del Smith
- Fred Stickel
- Peter Stott
- Charles Swindells
- Ron Timpe
- Ben Whiteley
- Nancy Wilgenbusch
- Ted Winnowski
- Dick Woolworth

The Portlanders are gathered near the intersection of Southwest Broadway and Morrison Street, and several of the city's buildings are shown in the background, including the Broadway Building, Hilton Portland Hotel, Jackson Tower, Nordstrom, Pioneer Courthouse, and the Standard Insurance Center.

== History ==
The mural was commissioned by Serge D'Rovencourt, a former manager of the Hilton Portland Hotel, and originally displayed in the hotel's restaurant, called Bistro 921, starting in 1995. In 2014, the hotel and bistro were remodeled and the painting was donated to the Oregon Historical Society. The work was displayed in the Oregon Historical Society Museum's North Wing Gallery in early 2015, for was showcased again for one month in 2018.

== Reception ==
The Oregonian's John Killen called the painting "fun" and "fanciful", and Douglas Perry said the mural was a "local favorite".

== See also ==
- Culture of Portland, Oregon
- List of public art in Portland, Oregon
- Women Making History in Portland (2007), another mural depicting and honoring Portland women
