= Whistlestop for an Organ Teacher =

Sculpture in Portland, Oregon, U.S.

- The sculpture in 2015
- Artist: Cris Bruch
- Year: 2009
- Type: Sculpture
- Medium: Stainless steel
- Dimensions: 3.2 m × 1.8 m × 0.94 m (127 in × 72 in × 37 in)
- Location: Portland, Oregon, United States; 45.51924°N 122.67744°W
- Owner: City of Portland and Multnomah County Public Art Collection

Whistlestop for an Organ Teacher is an outdoor 2009 stainless steel sculpture by American artist Cris Bruch, located in Portland, Oregon.

== Description and history ==
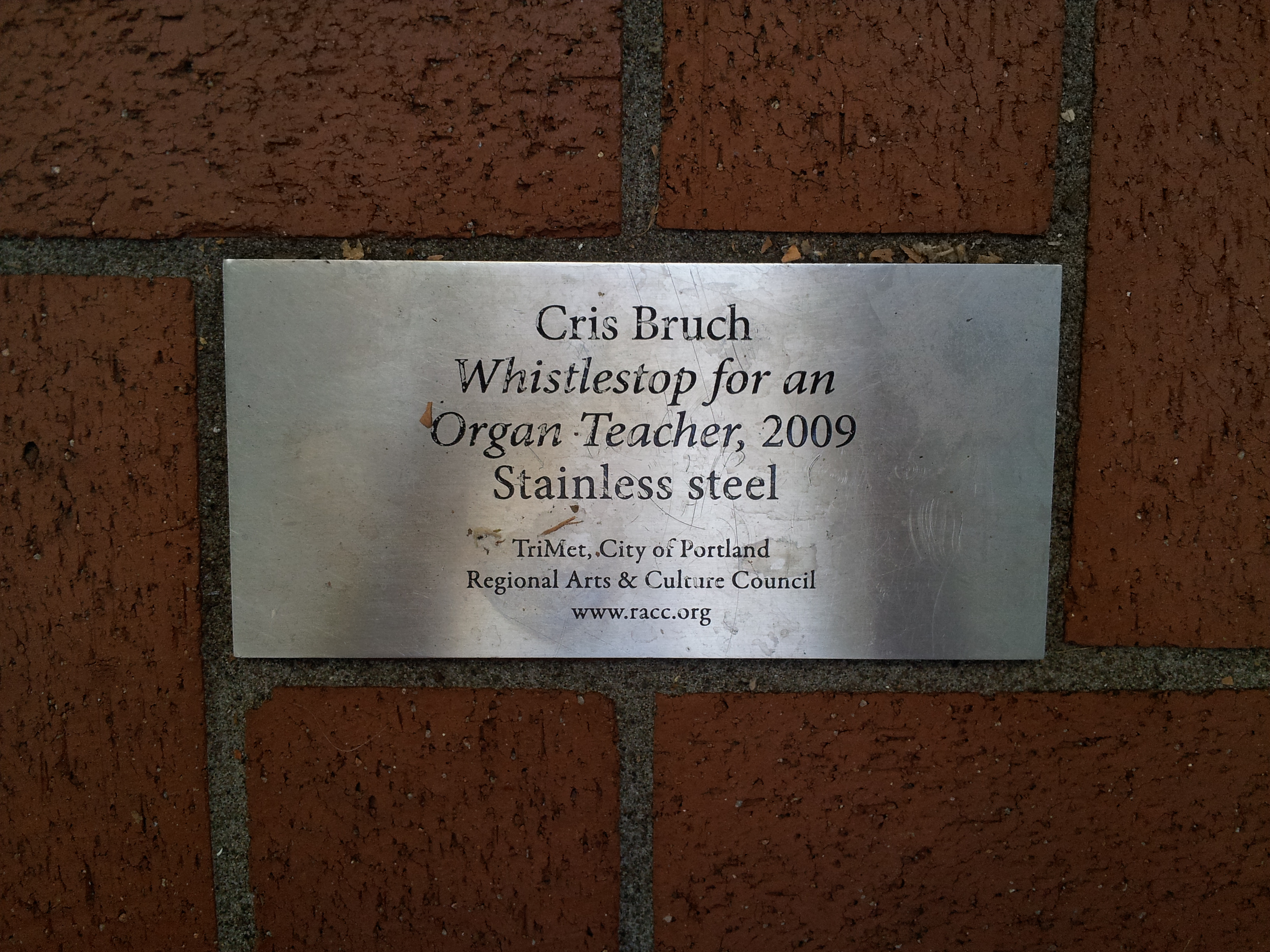
Plaque for the sculpture

Whistlestop was designed by Cris Bruch and completed in 2009. It is located at the intersection of Southwest 5th Avenue and Southwest Morrison Street, along the Portland Transit Mall in Portland, Oregon. The stainless steel sculpture depicts pipe organ components, specifically a windchest and three "fanciful" pipes. It measures 127 inches (3.2 m) x 72 inches (1.8 m) x 37 inches (0.94 m) and weighs 1,200 pounds. According to Bruch, it is intended to "evoke sound and provide a quiet moment in an urban streetscape, and the softly reflective surface picks up changes in light and color." One contributor to Blog Down to Washington, a website curated by the University of Washington Alumni Association, described the sculpture as "curved and fluted pipes rising from a low box, also mitered and angled to appear sharp and otherworldly".

The sculpture was commissioned by TriMet and was fabricated by the Seattle-based company Fabrication Specialties, Ltd. It is part of the City of Portland and Multnomah County Public Art Collection courtesy of the Regional Arts & Culture Council.

Whistlestop has been included in at least one published walking tour of Portland.

== See also ==
- 2009 in art
