= Water, Please =

Sculpture in Portland, Oregon

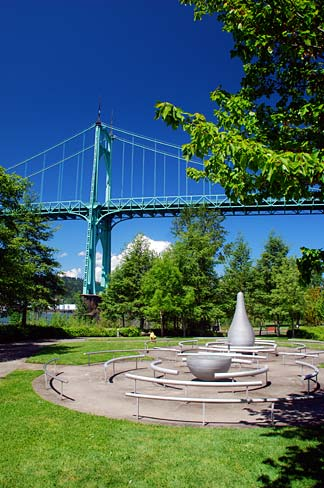
- The sculpture in 2010
- Artist: Don Merkt
- Year: 1997
- Location: Portland, Oregon, United States
- 45.58534°N 122.76053°W

Water, Please is a 1997 aluminum and stainless steel sculpture by Don Merkt, installed outside the Water Pollution Control Laboratory at 6543 North Burlington Avenue, in north Portland, Oregon's Cathedral Park neighborhood, in the United States. Inspired by the relationship between people and water, the work is part of the collection of the City of Portland and Multnomah County Public Art Collection courtesy of the Regional Arts & Culture Council. It measures 9' x 30' x 54' and was funded by the City of Portland's Bureau of Environmental Services.

== See also ==
- 1997 in art
