= Avenue of Murals =

Public art corridor in Portland, Oregon, U.S.

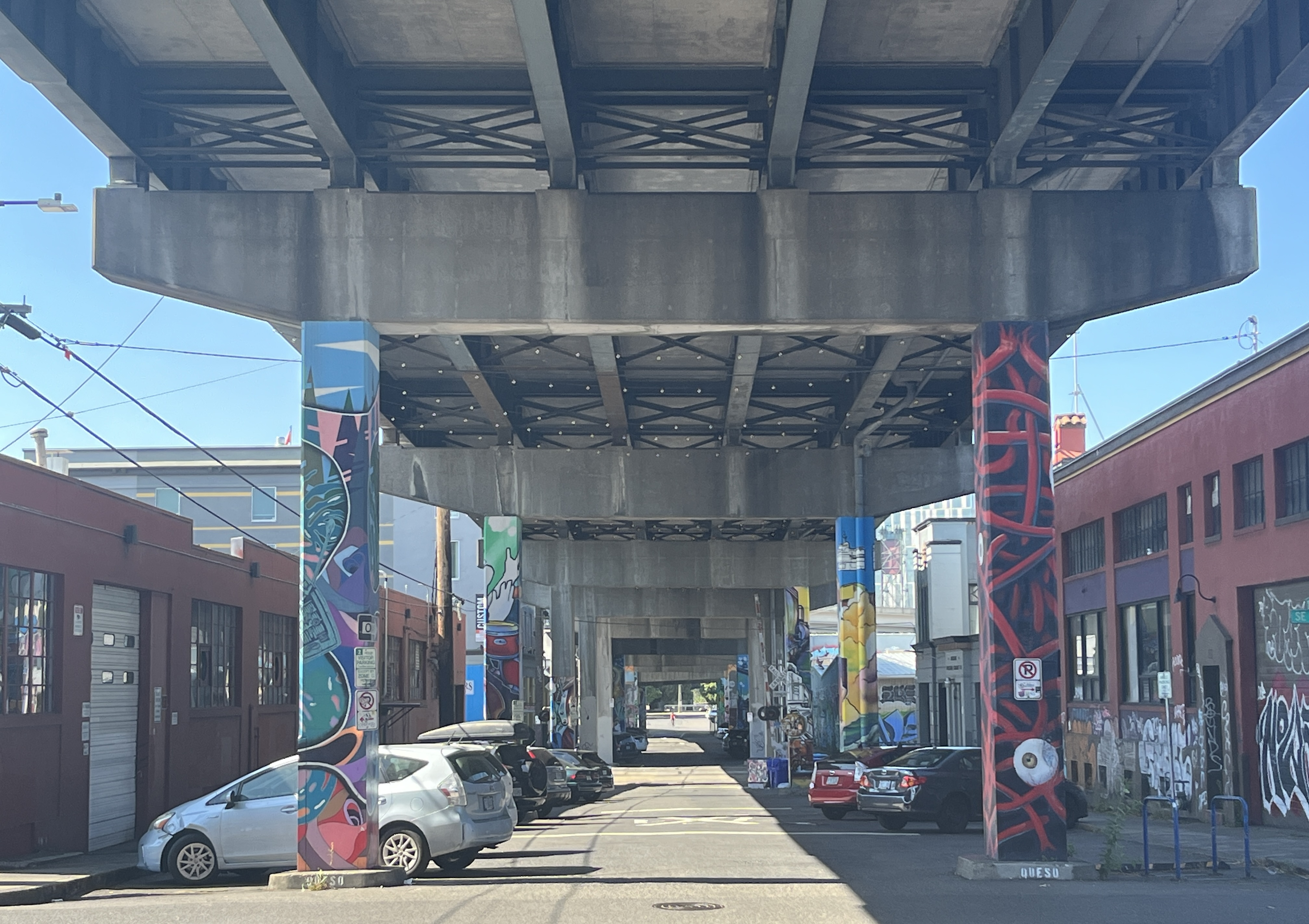
Avenue of Murals, 2025

The Avenue of Murals is a public art corridor featuring a series of murals along Madison Street in Portland, Oregon, United States.

== Description ==
The Avenue of Murals is a public art corridor with approximately 20 murals along Madison Street in southeast Portland. The works are painted on columns underneath the Hawthorne Bridge Viaduct, between the Willamette River and Second Avenue. According to the Portland Tribune, the series "[transformed] a once dark and dreary area into a vibrant public art corridor celebrating the past, present, and future" of the city's Central Eastside.

== History ==
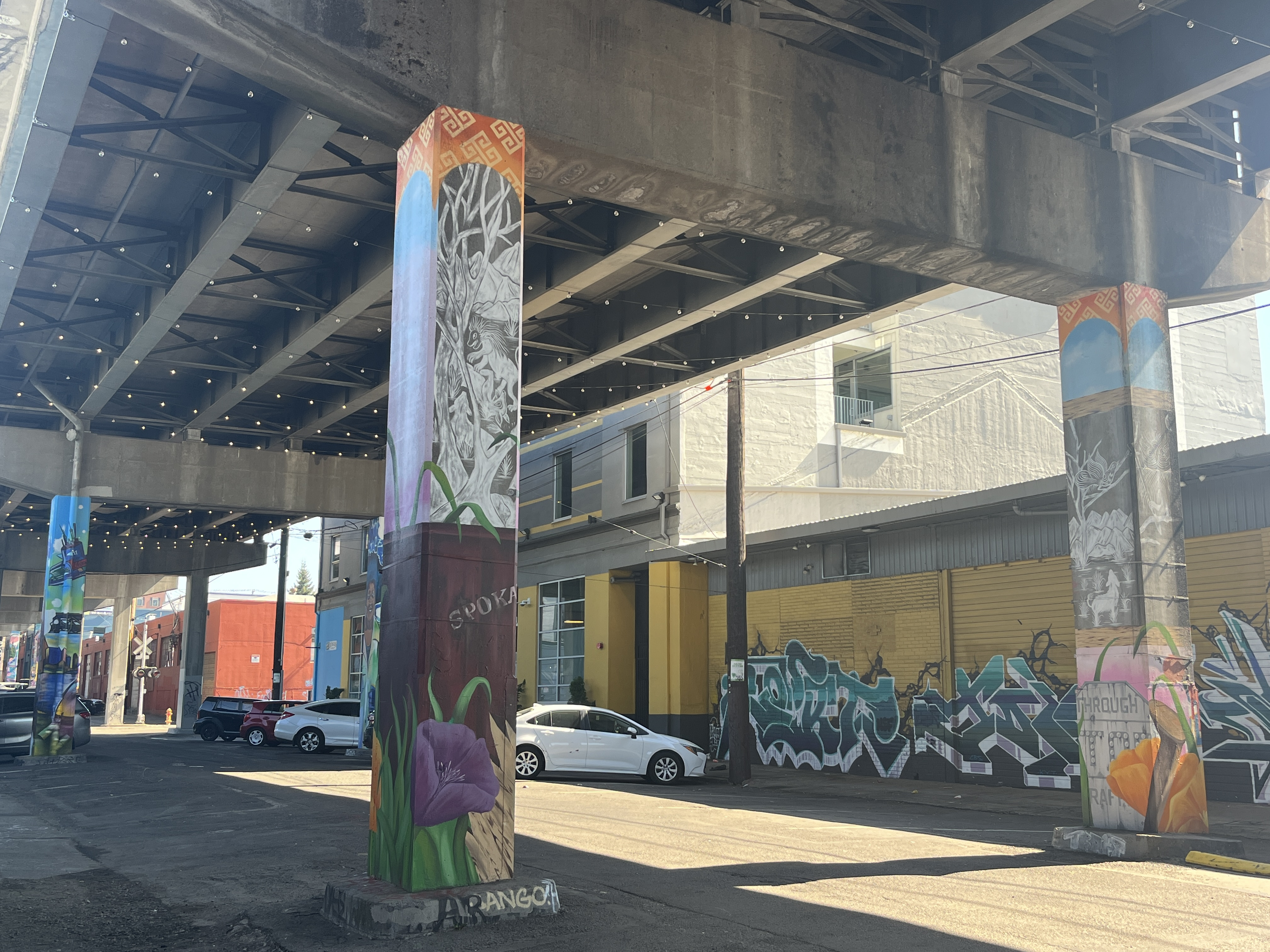
Murals (2025)

The Portland Street Art Alliance (PSAA) began collaborating with local groups to create the corridor in 2022. Central Eastside Together has contributed to the project.

In 2023, the PSAA launched the Viaduct Arts Column Mural Initiative and hired local artist Hayden Senter to design and paint four murals commemorating Portland institutions at the intersection of Madison and Water Avenue. This first phase of the project had two columns that pay tribute to the original Lovejoy Columns by Tom Stefopoulos, one inspired by the Portland Rose Festival's dragon boat races, and another focused on the Ground Score Association, which the PSAA describes as the city's "democratic worker association of dumpster divers, canners, and waste pickers".

In 2024, the Central Eastside Industrial Council and Central Eastside Together hosted a bike ride along the corridor.

For the project's third phase, artists Paola De La Cruz and Kyra Watkins, the PSAA, and the Regional Arts & Culture Council worked to add seven additional murals between Martin Luther King Jr. Boulevard and Second Avenue in 2025. Three of the murals were by De La Cruz and four representing various local industries (fishing, produce trade, shipping, sports) were by Watkins.

== Reception ==
In 2024, KGW said the murals "add to the district's reputation as a public art destination, as well as revitalize the space".

== See also ==
- Culture of Portland, Oregon
