= Untitled (Killmaster) =

Sculpture by John Killmaster in Portland, Oregon, U.S.

- The sculpture in 2015
- Artist: John Killmaster
- Year: 1977
- Type: Sculpture
- Medium: Steel, porcelain enamel
- Condition: "Treatment needed" (1993)
- Location: Portland, Oregon, United States; 45°31′20″N 122°40′32″W
- Owner: City of Portland and Multnomah County Public Art Collection courtesy of the Regional Arts & Culture Council

Untitled is an outdoor 1977 steel and porcelain enamel sculpture by American artist John Killmaster, located in downtown Portland, Oregon. It is part of the City of Portland and Multnomah County Public Art Collection courtesy of the Regional Arts & Culture Council.

== Description and history ==
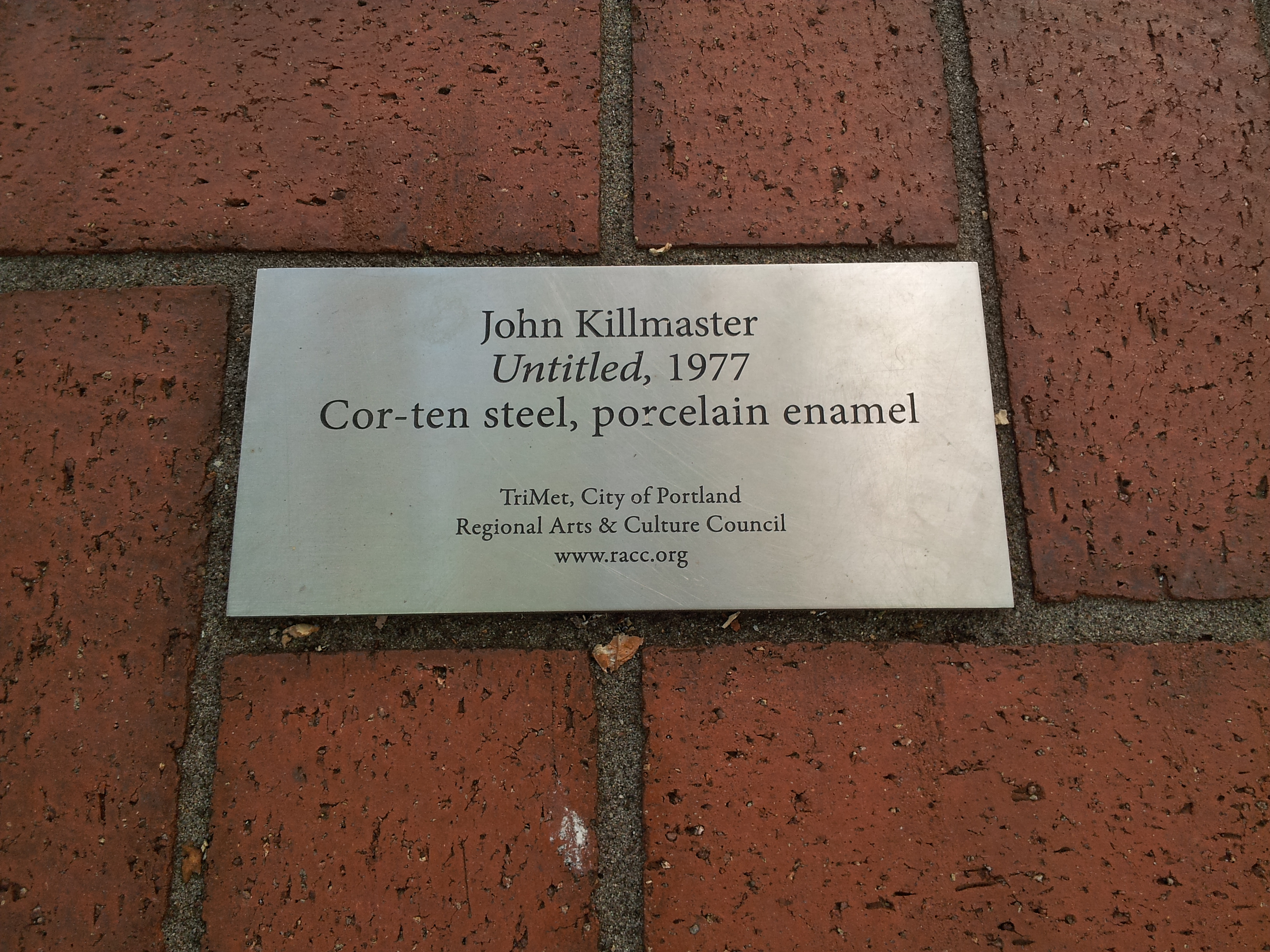
Plaque for the sculpture

Untitled, completed by John Killmaster in 1977, is a steel and porcelain enamel sculpture located at the intersection of Southwest 5th Avenue and Southwest Pine Street in the Portland Transit Mall since 2009. It was funded by TriMet and the United States Department of Transportation. According to the Regional Arts & Culture Council, which administers the work, "This sculpture features Killmaster’s mastery of enamel with large panels that display brightly colored abstract designs." It measures 5 feet (1.5 m), 5 inches (13 cm) x 4 feet (1.2 m), 5 inches (13 cm) x 5 feet (1.5 m), 5 inches (13 cm).

Its condition was deemed "treatment needed" by the Smithsonian Institution's "Save Outdoor Sculpture!" program in December 1993. At that time, the sculpture was administered by the City of Portland's Metropolitan Arts Commission. Presently, the work is part of the City of Portland and Multnomah County Public Art Collection courtesy of the Regional Arts & Culture Council.

== Reception ==
In her walking tour of Portland, Sybilla Avery Cook said the sculpture's "bright crayon colors... make it resemble a child's building set."

== See also ==
- 1977 in art
