= Untitled (Morrison) =

Sculpture by Ivan Morrison in Portland, Oregon, U.S.

- The sculpture in 2015
- Artist: Ivan Morrison
- Year: 1977
- Type: Sculpture
- Medium: Painted aluminum
- Location: Portland, Oregon, United States; 45°31′18″N 122°40′33″W
- Owner: Regional Arts & Culture Council

Untitled is an outdoor 1977 painted aluminum sculpture by Ivan Morrison, located at Southwest 5th Avenue and Southwest Oak Street in the Transit Mall of Portland, Oregon.

== Description ==
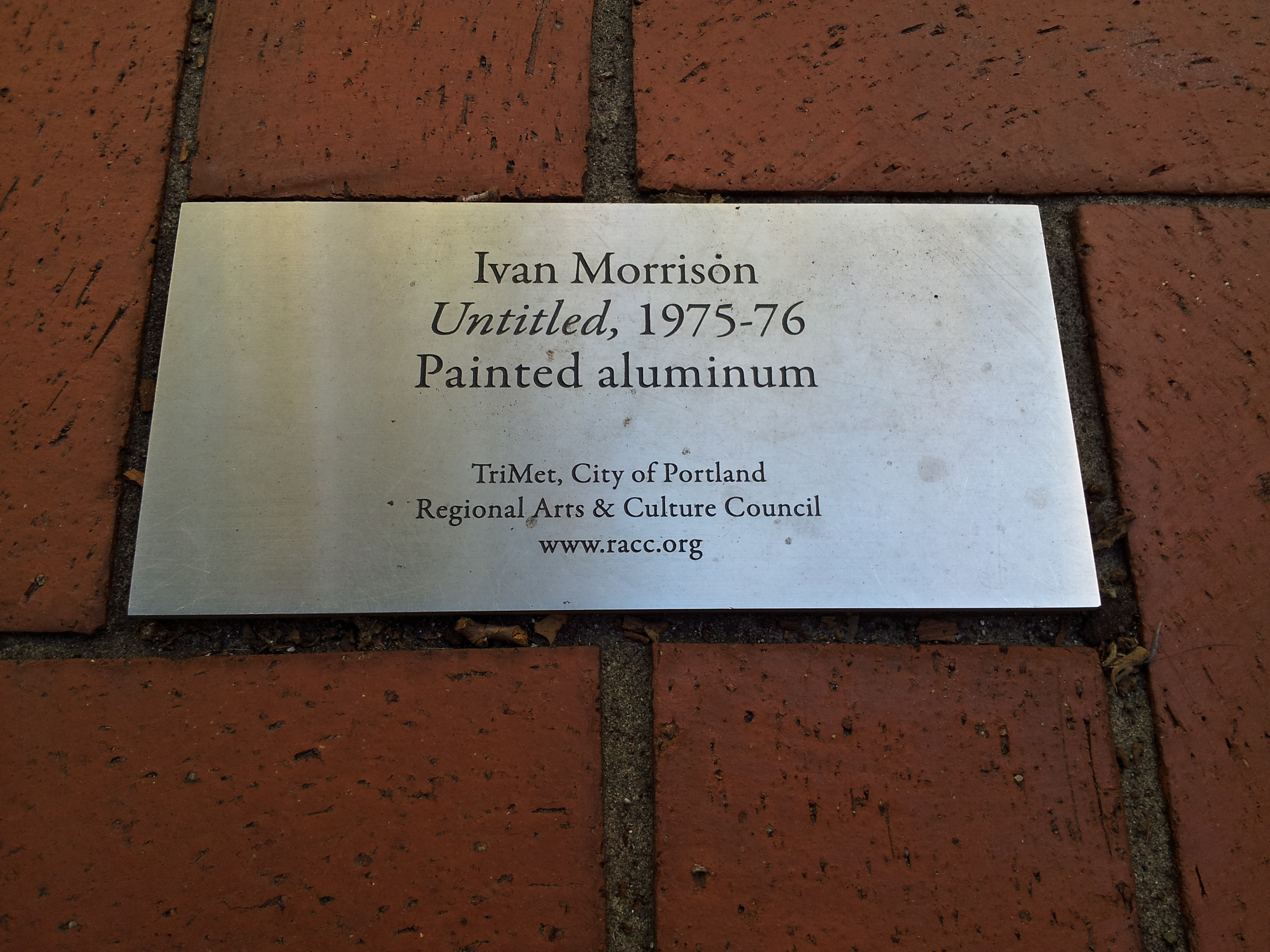
Plaque for the sculpture

The sculpture, funded by TriMet and the United States Department of Transportation, measures 7 feet (2.1 m) x 8 feet (2.4 m), 6 inches (15 cm) x 2 feet (0.61 m), 4 inches (10 cm), and appears to blend mediums, "rendering two-dimensional fields of color in a three-dimensional form". Parts are painted blue, red, yellow and white and contains no inscriptions. The Smithsonian Institution categorizes the sculpture as abstract (geometric). Untitled was surveyed and considered "treatment urgent" by Smithsonian's "Save Outdoor Sculpture!" program in 1993.

The work is part of the collection of the Regional Arts & Culture Council. It has been included in at least one published walking tour of Portland. The tour's author said the sculpture's panels "form a child-size hiding place".

== See also ==
- 1977 in art
