= The Rippling Wall =

Sculpture in Portland, Oregon, U.S.

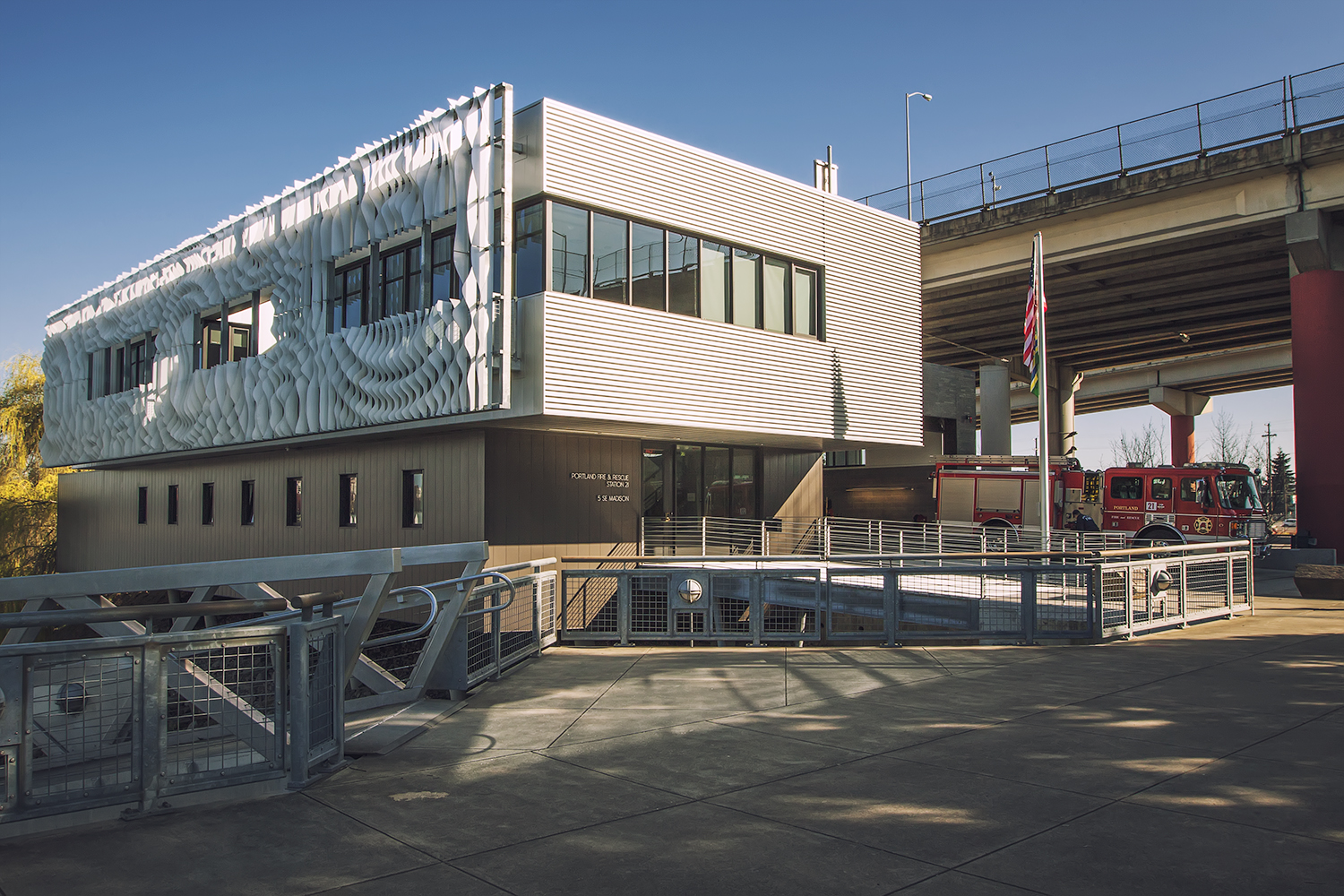
- The sculpture at Portland Fire Station 21, 2015
- Artist: David Franklin
- Year: 2014
- Type: Sculpture
- Medium: Aluminum
- Location: Portland, Oregon, United States; 45.51323°N 122.66842°W
- Website: davidfranklinart.net/portfolio/rippling-wall/

The Rippling Wall is a 2014 outdoor aluminum sculpture by David Franklin, installed on the facade of Portland Fire & Rescue Station 21 in Portland, Oregon's Buckman neighborhood, in the United States.

== Description and history ==
The Rippling Wall, designed by David Franklin, is installed on the facade of Portland Fire & Rescue Station 21 at 5 Southeast Madison Street on the east bank of the Willamette River. It is administered by the Regional Arts & Culture Council.

== Reception ==
In 2015, the work was one of three 2014 public art projects in the city, and 31 in the United States, recognized by Americans for the Arts as among the best in the country.

== See also ==
- 2014 in art
