= Upstream Downtown =

Sculpture in Portland, Oregon

- Upstream Downtown at night, 2026
- Artist: Gary Hirsch
- Year: 1992
- Type: Sculpture
- Medium: Aluminum, acrylic, enamel
- Location: Portland, Oregon, United States; 45.518506°N 122.676049°W
- Owner: City of Portland and Multnomah County Public Art Collection courtesy of the Regional Arts & Culture Council

Upstream Downtown is an outdoor 1992 sculpture by American artist Gary Hirsch, installed along the exterior side of the parking garage at Southwest 3rd Avenue and Southwest Morrison Street in Portland, Oregon. The installation features a series of eighteen multi-colored fish sculptures made of aluminum, acrylic and enamel, each measuring 4 feet (1.2 m) x 12 feet (3.7 m). According to the Regional Arts & Culture Council, which administers the work, Hirsch said: "I intended the piece to serve as a whimsical analogy to downtown business life. It's frenetic, humorous story with each of us bustling against the stream to get what we want." It is part of the City of Portland and Multnomah County Public Art Collection courtesy of the Regional Arts & Culture Council.

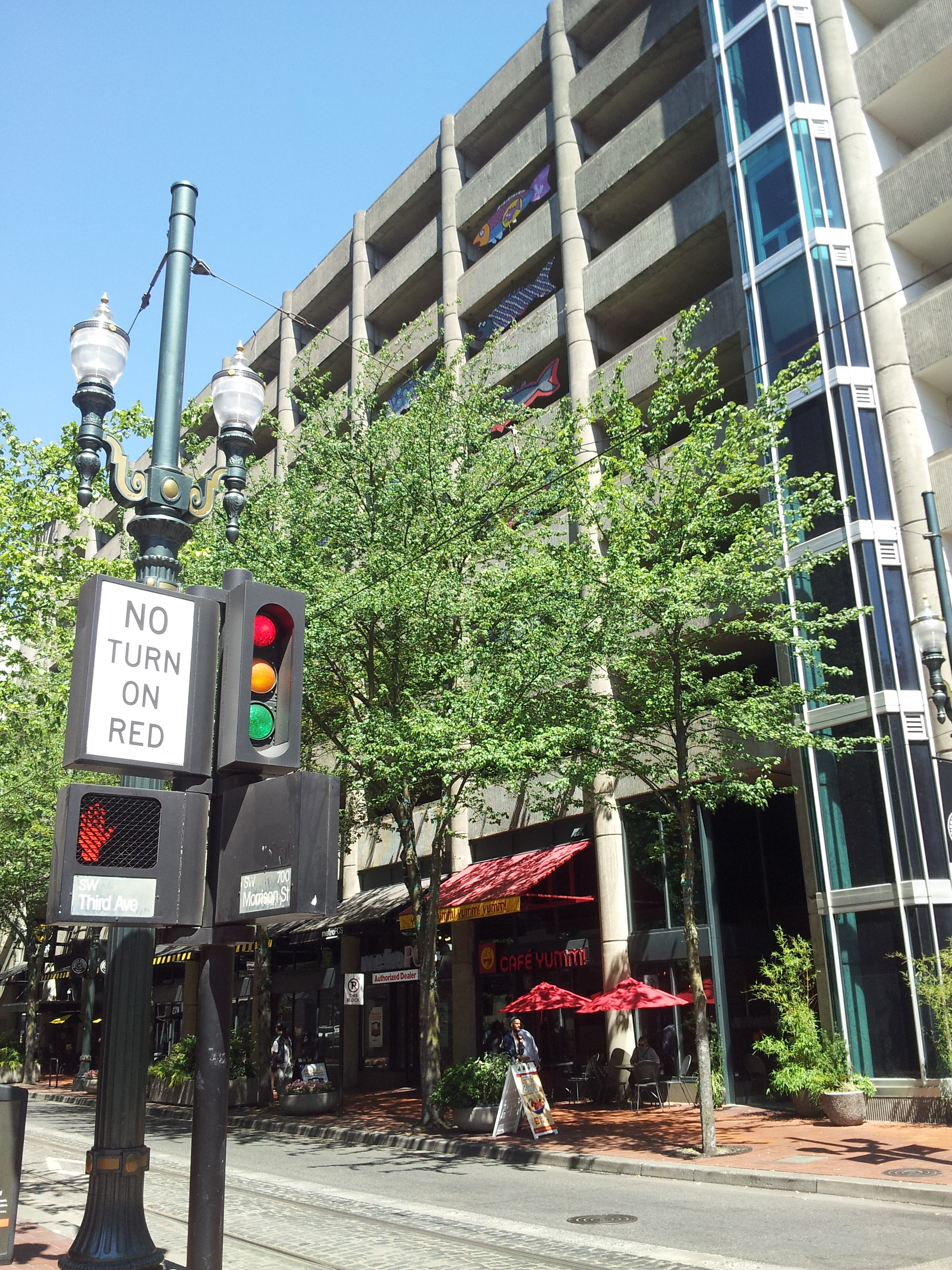
Obstructed view of the installation on the side of the parking garage in 2015

== See also ==
- 1992 in art
