= Salmon Cycle Marker =

Sculpture in Portland, Oregon

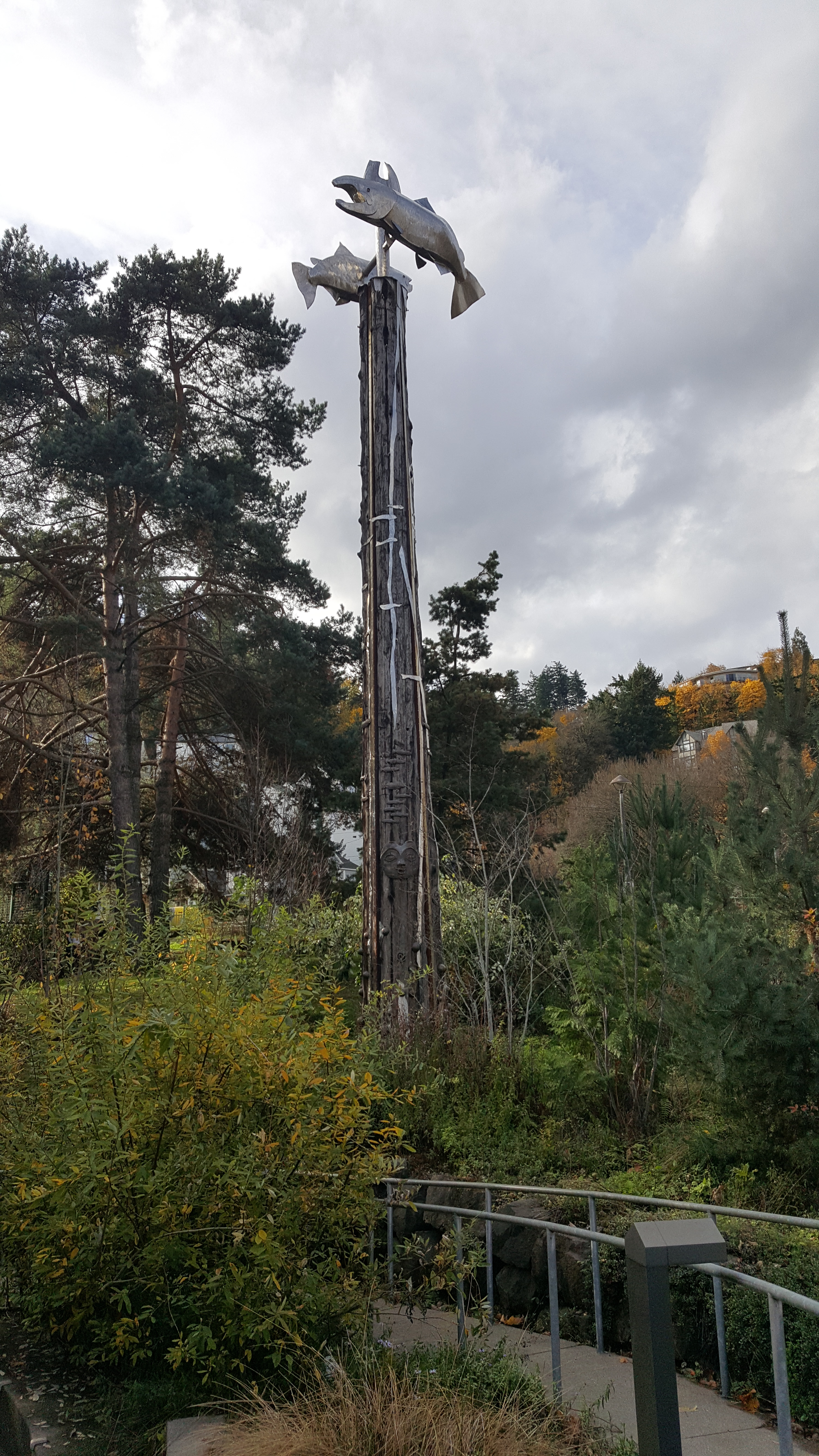
- The sculpture in 2018
- Artist: Ken MacKintosh; Lillian Pitt
- Year: 2005
- Medium: Wood; bronze; stainless steel
- Location: Portland, Oregon, United States; 45.509444°N 122.686123°W

Salmon Cycle Marker is a 2005 sculpture by Ken MacKintosh and Lillian Pitt, installed outside Portland State University's Native American Student and Community Center, in the U.S. state of Oregon.

== Description and history ==
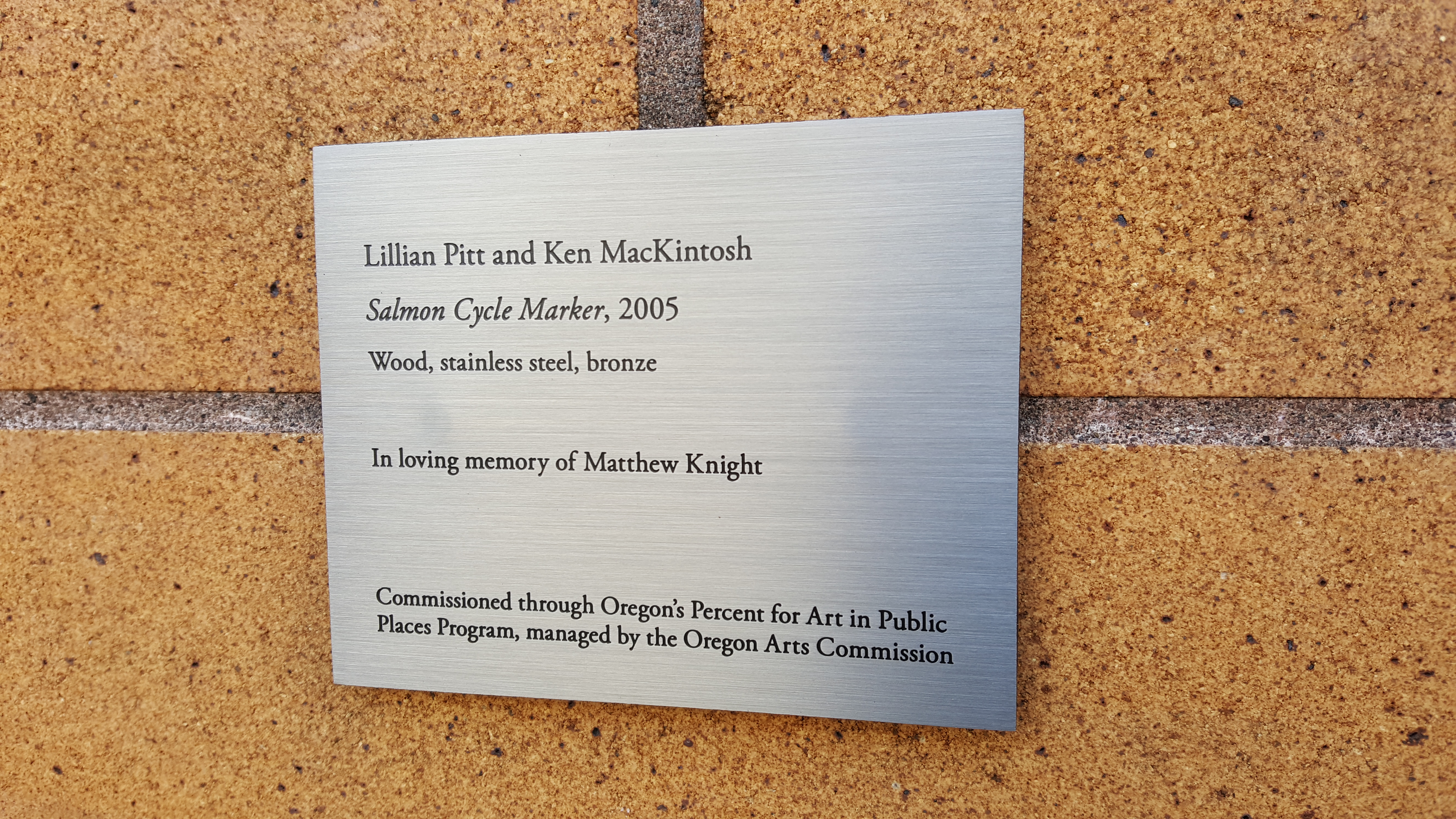
Plaque for the sculpture, 2018

Salmon Cycle Marker is installed at the intersection of Southwest Broadway and Jackson, just west of the Native American Student and Community Center on the Portland State University campus. The abstract sculpture, made of wood, bronze, and stainless steel, depicts salmon in the Columbia River Gorge, and their journey from birth to spawning. Its pole is made from three trees that fell during the 1980 eruption of Mount St. Helens. Images of salmon eggs appear at the base. The middle of the pole shows an image of Pitt's She Who Watches. MacKintosh's depiction of two salmon mating, as well as an abstract image of a salmon, appear at the top of the pole. According to Portland State University, the work is inspired by totem poles, and serves as a metaphor of "regional symbolism".

The sculpture has been included in at least one published walking tour of Portland.

== See also ==
- 2005 in art
