= Memorial Fountain =

Fountain in Portland, Oregon

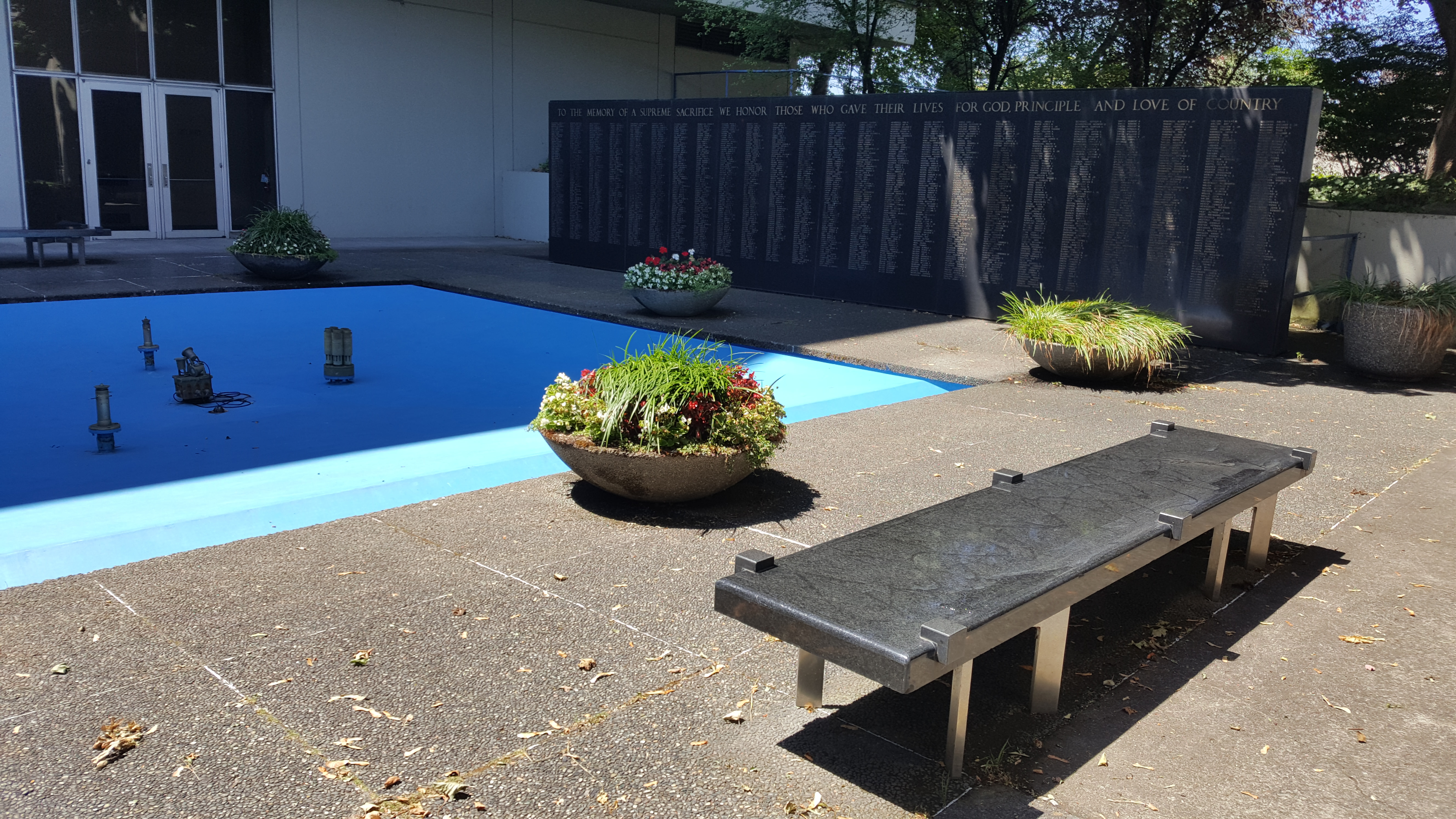
- The drained fountain and World War II Memorial, 2020
- Artist: Skidmore, Owings & Merrill (architectural firm)
- Type: Fountain, sculpture
- Medium: Marble or black granite, tile
- Condition: "Well maintained" (1993)
- Location: Portland, Oregon, United States; 45.53273°N 122.66905°W

Memorial Fountain is an outdoor fountain created by the architectural firm Skidmore, Owings & Merrill, located outside Veterans Memorial Coliseum in Portland, Oregon, United States.

== Description ==
Memorial Fountain is dedicated to those who died at war and features a marble or black granite wall and a water basin with blue and turquoise tile. The wall is approximately 8 feet (2.4 m) tall and has a diameter of 5 inches (13 cm); inscribed are 24 columns of names of Oregonians who died in 20th century wars and the text overhead, IN MEMORY OF A SUPREME SACRIFICE WE HONOR THOSE WHO GAVE THEIR LIVES FOR GOD, PRINCIPLE AND LOVE OF COUNTRY. The basin is approximately 27 feet (8.2 m) wide and has a diameter of 27 feet (8.2 m); the memorial wall is at the pool's north end. The square in-ground fountain features three water "elements", each with lights on either side. One shoots water up to 13 feet (4.0 m) into the air, and the other two spew water 2 feet (0.61 m) to 4 feet (1.2 m) into the air. The Smithsonian Institution categorizes Memorial Fountain as abstract and geometric. Its condition was deemed "well maintained" by the institution's "Save Outdoor Sculpture!" program in 1993. The fountain was owned by Blazer's Oregon Arena Corporation at that time.

== See also ==
- Fountains in Portland, Oregon
