= Oregon Landscape =

Sculpture in Portland, Oregon

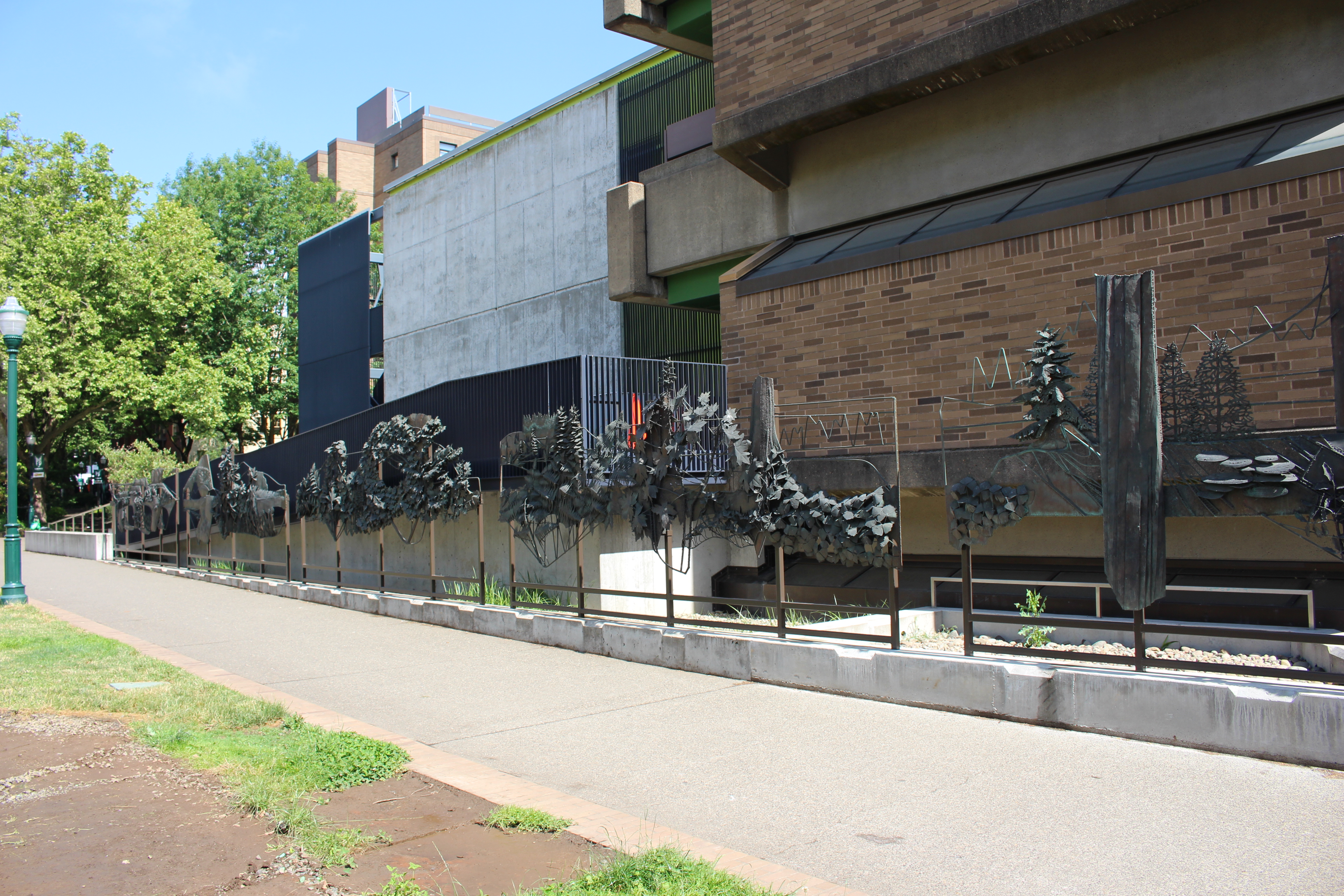
- The sculpture on the southern exterior wall of the Science Research and Teaching Center in 2018
- Artist: Thomas Hardy
- Location: Portland, Oregon, United States; 45°30′45.74″N 122°41′11.49″W

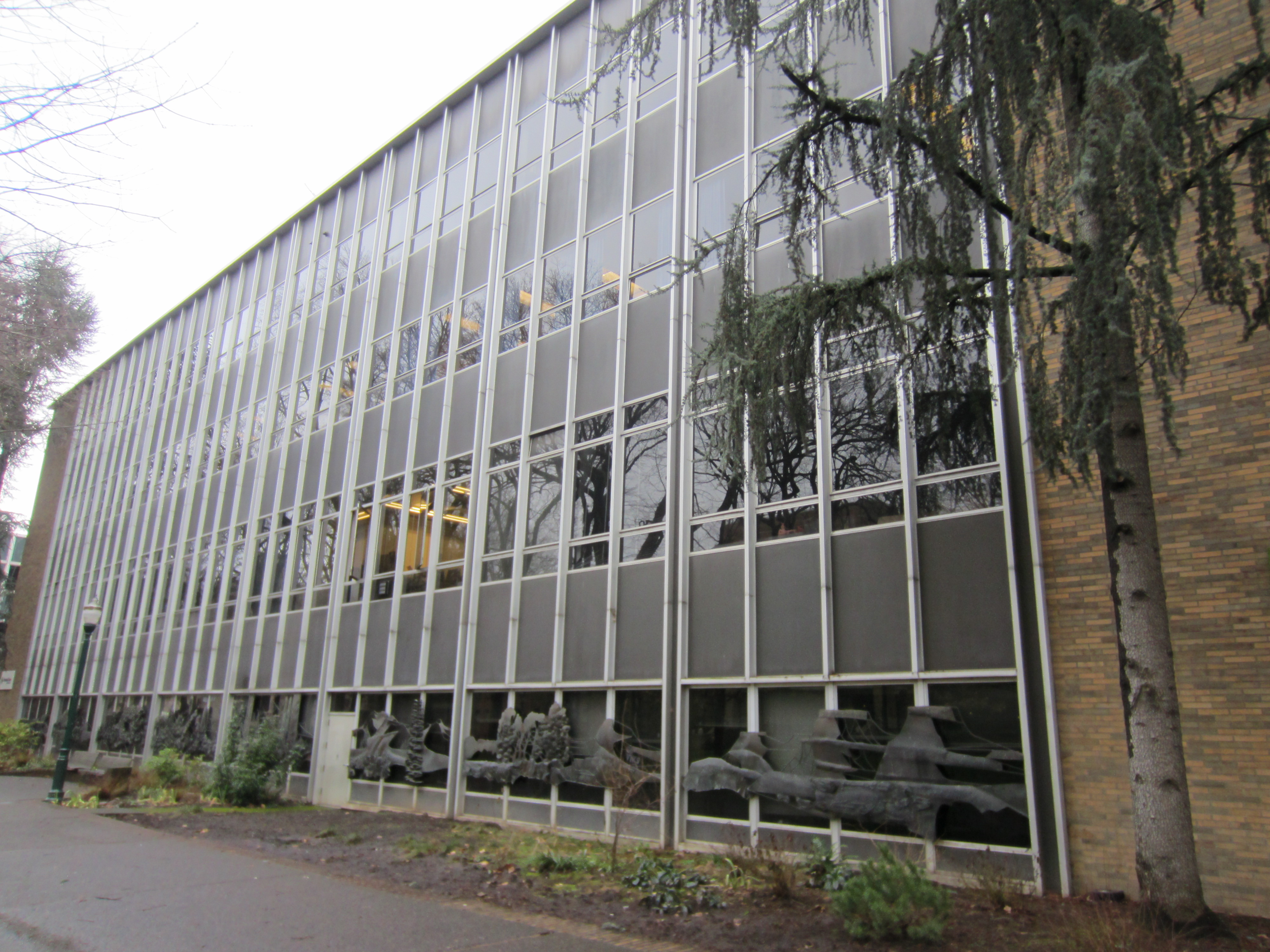
Fariborz Maseeh Hall's western facade in 2014

Oregon Landscape (also known as Hardy Relief, Oregon Country, and Oregon Landscapes) is a 1962 bronze sculpture by Tom Hardy, installed on the southern exterior wall of the Science Research and Teaching Center, on the Portland State University campus in Portland, Oregon, United States. Previously, the artwork was installed on Fariborz Maseeh Hall's western facade.

== Description and history ==
The work is Hardy's largest, and took a year to complete. It depicts Oregon's landscape from west to east, including marine life, Oregon Coast Range, Willamette Valley, Cascade Range, and John Day Fossil Beds National Monument. The sculpture measures approximately 7 feet (2.1 m) x 144 feet (44 m) x 8 inches (0.20 m), and is composed of eight panels with reddish-brown patina each measuring around 7 feet (2.1 m) x 18 feet (5.5 m). The screens depict animals and plants, as well as various landscapes. Oregon Country was surveyed by the Smithsonian Institution's "Save Outdoor Sculpture!" program in 1993. According to the survey, the abstract sculpture is an allegorical representation of Oregon.

== See also ==
- 1962 in art
