= Soaring Stones =

1990 sculpture by John T. Young in Walla Walla, Washington

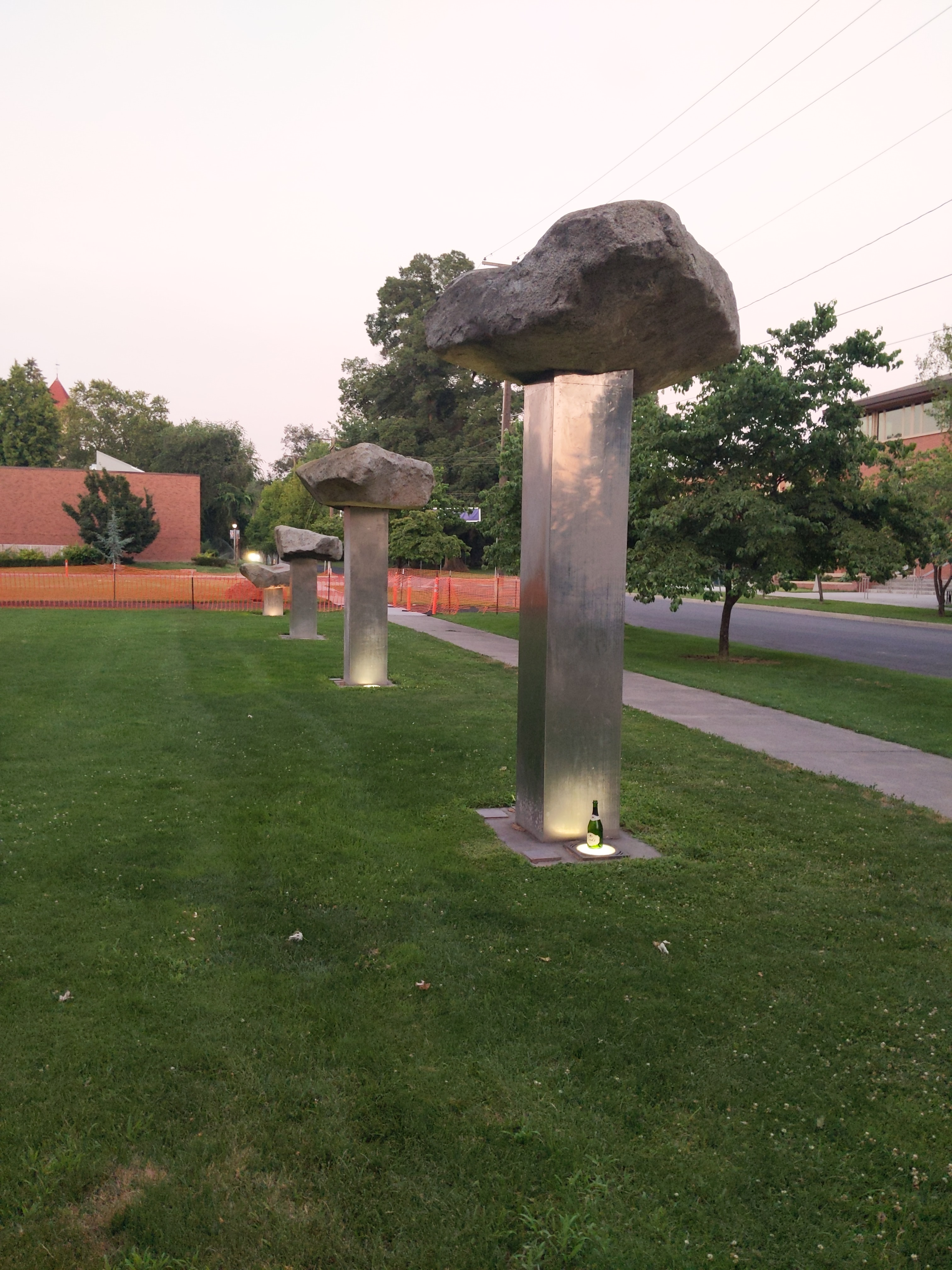
- The art installation at Whitman College in Walla Walla, Washington
- Artist: John T. Young
- Year: 1990
- Type: Sculpture
- Medium: Granite; stainless steel
- Location: Portland, Oregon (1990–2006) Walla Walla, Washington (2007–present); 46.070238°N 118.331844°W
- Owner: Pioneer Place, Ltd. (1990–2006); John T. Young (2006–2007); Whitman College (2007–present)

Soaring Stones, also known as Rouse Rocks, Soaring Rocks, and Stones on Sticks, is a 1990 granite-and-steel sculpture by John T. Young. It was first installed in the Transit Mall of Portland, Oregon, and was later sited as Soaring Stones #4 at Whitman College in Walla Walla, Washington. The sculpture was commissioned for $100,000 to replace a fountain that was removed during construction of Pioneer Place.

During the construction of the MAX Light Rail in 2006, it was removed and returned to Young, who then donated the work to Whitman College. The sculpture is intended to represent the "interface between man and nature"; it features six irregular Washington granite rock forms installed in a row, in order of ascending height. The work inspired David Glenn, professor of music at Whitman College, to compose a piano quintet piece titled "Sculpture Garden for Piano Quintet" for the 2009 Walla Walla Chamber Music Festival.

== History ==
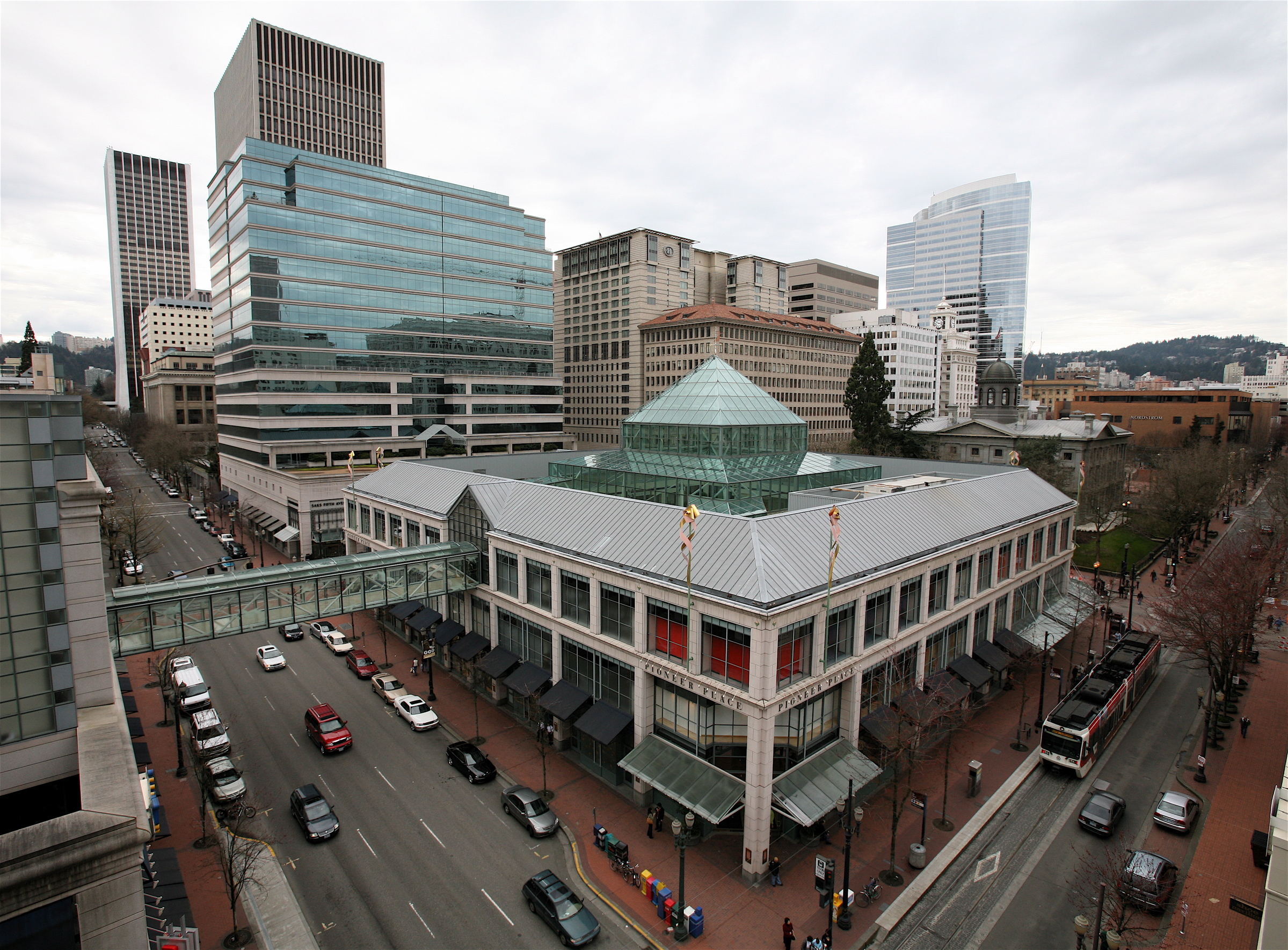
The sculpture was installed outside Pioneer Place in 1990.

John T. Young's Soaring Stones was commissioned in 1989 for $100,000 as a gift to city residents by Pioneer Place, Ltd., an affiliate of Rouse-Portland, Inc., to replace a fountain that was removed during construction of the Pioneer Place mall. The sculpture was completed and installed at Southwest 5th Street between Taylor Street and Yamhill Street in downtown Portland's Transit Mall in 1990. The sculpture was surveyed and deemed as "treatment needed" by the Smithsonian's "Save Outdoor Sculpture!" program in October 1993, and was administered by Rouse-Portland, Inc., Pioneer Place, Ltd. at that time.

In 2006, the sculpture was removed and returned to its owner due to construction of the MAX Light Rail. The University of Washington's Architectural Commission considered moving the work to a "very unique site" because of its design and size. Young was a professor of art at the institution. In 2007, Young donated the work to Whitman College in Walla Walla, Washington, where it was installed outside Cordiner Hall as Soaring Stones #4.

== Description ==
According to Young, Soaring Stones represents the "interface between man and nature". It consists of six irregularly shaped pieces of Washington granite that were quarried from the Cascade Range, displayed in a row in ascending height. While installed in Portland, the first stone was sunk into the pavement. The rest were set on polished stainless steel pedestals, the tallest of which reached 11.5 ft (3.5 m). Elevated boulders had recessed lighting.

The Smithsonian Institution described the sculpture as "reminiscent of the Cascade Mountain Range from which the media came", and categorized it as abstract and allegorical of nature. Alongside the sculpture was a plaque that said, "SOARING STONES" / BY JOHN T. YOUNG, SEATTLE, WA / © 1990 / SPONSORED BY PIONEER PLACE LTD. Installed at the Whitman College campus, Soaring Stones #4 spans 150 ft (46 m) and the highest of its rocks reaches 12 ft 4 in (3.76 m) tall.

== Reception ==
In 1990, The Seattle Times said Soaring Stones' ascending pieces looked "as if they were taking off into flight ... [r]ather like Young's career". The sculpture was included in at least one published walking tour of Portland and in another by Whitman College about art on the campus. David Glenn, professor of music at Whitman College, took inspiration from Soaring Stones #4 and other art pieces on the campus for his composition "Sculpture Garden for Piano Quintet", a piano quintet commissioned for the opening concert of the 2009 Walla Walla Chamber Music Festival. Glenn based his work on a September 2008 walk through the campus; he used Young's sculpture as inspiration for the quintet's final movement. He said of the sculpture's influence:

Since there are six boulders used in the sculpture, I based this movement in the time signature of 6/4, with a sub-division of four and two (four on pedestals; two on ground). I also used a six-note melodic theme that rises six times, descends six times and then rises again six times. The rising and falling represent different perspectives the viewer of the sculpture can have—either looking from right to left or left to right.

== See also ==
- 1990 in art
- 2007 in art
