= The Burnside Nest =

Sculpture in Portland, Oregon, U.S.

- Artist: Hannes Wingate
- Year: 2014
- Type: Sculpture
- Medium: Wood, metal
- Subject: Bird nest
- Location: Portland, Oregon, United States; 45°31′23.8″N 122°39′47.7″W

The Burnside Nest was a temporary outdoor sculpture by Swedish artist Hannes Wingate, installed in Portland, Oregon, United States, in 2014.

== Description and history ==
Hannes Wingate's The Burnside Nest was a temporary, "unsolicited" outdoor spherical sculpture resembling an oversized bird nest. It was installed in a 30-foot (9.1 m) tree on private property north of the east side of the Burnside Bridge, adjacent to the Burnside Skatepark near the intersection of Northeast 3rd Avenue and Couch Street. Wingate, who lives in Portland part-time, constructed the sculpture from branches found from the site and around the city. He also included man-made materials, similar to the way birds create nests. Objects woven into the nest include a box-spring, part of a chair, rebar, a street sign, and two-by-fours. Wingate has said of the sculpture, "Only humans consider nature as separate from themselves. The bird does not. Therefore, it forages for materials that are usable for the nest and doesn't care if they're 'natural' or not, as long as they work."

Despite having a land-use permit from the Portland Development Commission, Wingate was stopped four times by local police officers on the day he began creating the sculpture. It was unveiled on May 10, 2014. During the preview, five people climbed up the tree and sat in the nest, even though the structure was not designed to hold people and was positioned on private property. The sculpture was scheduled to be removed at the end of July and replaced by the Burnside Bridgehead. According to Willamette Week, the artist spoke with the project's developer and Skylab Architecture about returning the sculpture after the building's construction was complete.

== Reception ==
Willamette Week's Richard Speer called the work "a bird's nest on steroids" and compared it to sculptures by British artist Andy Goldsworthy. Furthermore, he wrote, "The Burnside Nest is damned cute. It's a nest, for crying out loud, primal symbol of home and nurturing. And although nobody is likely to mistake it for a High Modernist masterpiece by Constantin Brâncuși or Henry Moore, the sculpture has a crunchy, eco-friendly coziness that could bring out the kid in even the most jaded curmudgeon."

== See also ==
- 2014 in art
