= Velosaurus =

Sculpture in Portland, Oregon

- Artist: Horatio Law
- Year: 2015
- Type: Sculpture
- Medium: Concrete, steel
- Location: Portland, Oregon, United States
- 45.50011°N 122.64900°W

Velosaurus is an outdoor 2015 concrete and painted steel sculpture by Horatio Law, installed beneath the Powell Blvd. Light Rail Overpass between the MAX Orange Line's Clinton St/SE 12th Ave and Clinton St/SE 12th Ave stations in southeast Portland, Oregon, in the United States. The piece is a series of eight bas-relief panels made of recycled bicycle and skateboard parts, arranged to appear like dinosaur skeletal remains.

== See also ==
- 2015 in art
