= O Cruceiro =

Sculpture in Portland, Oregon, U.S.

- Spanish: El Crucerios de la Universitad
- The sculpture in 2018
- Artist: Marvin Swartz (designer); Eldimiro Fernandez Justo (sculptor)
- Year: 1986
- Medium: Granite sculpture
- Location: Portland, Oregon, United States
- 45°34′20.5″N 122°43′35.7″W

O Cruceiro, also known as El Crucerios de la Universitad, is an outdoor granite sculpture installed on the University of Portland campus in Portland, Oregon, United States. It was designed by Marvin Swartz and sculpted by Eldimiro Fernandez Justo, having been commissioned by Dr. Manuel "Manny" Jato Macias in 1984 in memory of his parents and brother. The sculpture was dedicated on April 30, 1986, and renovated in 2013.

== Description ==
The granite sculpture measures approximately 14 feet (4.3 m) x 20 inches (0.51 m) x 16 inches (0.41 m), with a self-base measuring approximately 18 inches (0.46 m) x 20 inches (0.51 m) x 20 inches (0.51 m). The concrete base is approximately 4.5 inches (0.11 m) x 49 inches (1.2 m) x 49 inches (1.2 m).

An inscription on the base's plaque reads: "O CRUCEIRO / This Cruceiro is from Galicia in Northwestern / Spain. Cruceiros are found at crossroads, plazas / and Church yards. They remind one of the Christian / Faith, encourage meditation and elicit prayers. / The figures are the Crucified Christ, Virgen del / Carmen and Santiago de Compostela (St. James). / Presented to the University of Portland in memory of: / Diego Macias (Suarez) 1884–1964 / Maria Jato Macias 1900–1961 / Salvador Jato Macias 1923–1956 / By Manuel Jato Macias."

== See also ==
- 1986 in art
