= Broken Wall Memorial =

War memorial in Portland, Oregon, U.S.

- United States
- For World War I, Korean War, Vietnam War and Gulf War service members associated with the university
- Established: 1948
- Location: 45.57265°N 122.72405°W; University of Portland near Portland, Oregon

The Broken Wall Memorial is an outdoor memorial installed on the University of Portland campus in Portland, Oregon, United States. It started with the Praying Hands Memorial, dedicated in 1948, and was expanded and rededicated in its current form on Veterans Day in 1990. The memorial commemorates World War I, Korean War, Vietnam War and Gulf War service members associated with the university, and features inscriptions of select names. Vigils are held at the site each Veterans Day.

== See also ==
- 1948 in art
