= Mikyoung Kim =

American landscape architect and urban designer

- Education: Oberlin College, Harvard Graduate School of Design
- Occupations: Landscape architect, academic
- Title: Founding principal of Mikyoung Kim Design

Mikyoung Kim, FASLA is an American landscape architect, urban designer, and founding principal of Mikyoung Kim Design.

== Early life and education ==
Mikyoung Kim was born in Hartford, Connecticut in 1967. She initially aimed for a career as a concert pianist until she developed tendinitis in her early 20s.

While at Oberlin College, Kim also studied sculpture. She graduated with a BS in Sculpture/Art History in 1989. She subsequently studied landscape architecture at Harvard Graduate School of Design, graduating in 1992. At Harvard, she studied concurrently at the GSD and at the MIT VES (Visual and Environmental Studies) department, developing designs, sculpture, installations and videos.

== Work ==
=== Mikyoung Kim Design ===
Kim's projects include the ChonGae Canal restoration in Seoul, Korea, TMC Helix Park at the Texas Medical Center Houston, TX, the Crown Sky Garden in Chicago, IL the Chicago Botanic Garden, the Plaza at the Prudential at 888 Boylston in Boston, the John Hancock Tower Roof Garden in Boston, MA, and Pier 4 Seaport Plaza in Boston, MA. The firm is best known for designing healing gardens, including the Crown Sky Garden at the Ann & Robert H. Lurie Children's Hospital of Chicago, the Boston Children's Hospital Green Urban Design, and the Miami Healing Garden at the Jackson South Community Hospital. The ChonGae Canal in Seoul, South Korea opened in 2005. The Canal includes the conversion of one of the city's polluted waterways into a local amenity that attracts 90,000 pedestrians a day.

=== Teaching ===
In 1994 she became a full time faculty member at the Rhode Island School of Design and opened her own firm in Boston, MA. She was a professor at Rhode Island School of Design from 1994 to 2012 and was the Department Head at RISD for five years. She has taught a variety of design and sculpture studios and seminars. Since 2012, Kim has held a Professor Emerita position. She has also taught at the Harvard Graduate School of Design from 2017 to 2018 as a Design Critic in Landscape Architecture. In Fall 2018 Kim held the Glimcher Distinguished Visiting Professor at the Knowlton School of Architecture at The Ohio State University.

=== Select awards ===
- 2010: Veronica Rudge Green Prize in Urban Design, Harvard University for ChonGae Canal in Seoul, South Korea - Architecture
