= Regional Arts & Culture Council =

- Logo

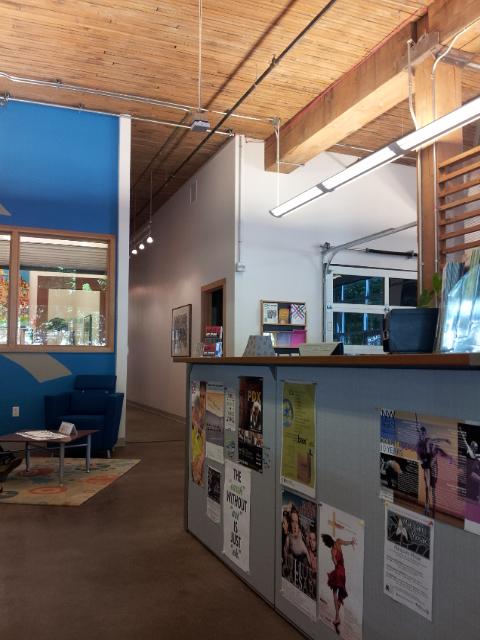
- Interior of the organization's office, 2013
- Abbreviation: RACC
- Predecessor: Metropolitan Arts Commission
- Region served: Portland metropolitan area
- Key people: Greg Netzer (interim executive director)

The Regional Arts & Culture Council (RACC) is an organization that administers arts grants in Multnomah, Washington, and Clackamas Counties that also do advocacy in the Portland metropolitan area in Oregon, United States. It evolved from the city’s Metropolitan Arts Commission agency in the 1990s. In 1995, the Metropolitan Arts Commission became the RACC as an independent non-profit organization. Its board of directors ousted the executive director Carol Tatch in November 2023 following an outside investigation.

== Mission and beneficiaries ==
The mission of the organization is to integrate arts and culture in all aspects of community life through vision, leadership and service. RACC is funded by the City of Portland, Multnomah, Clackamas, Washington counties, Metro, the Oregon Arts Commission, and several private donors. It provides programs and offers grants to artists and arts organizations throughout the region. RACC also manages the 1.33-percent-for-art program for Multnomah County, and the 2%-for-art program for the City of Portland. The City of Portland paid $228,000 for the Portlandia, statue in 1985 which was installed atop the Portland Building.

RACC funds a variety of not-for-profit, publicly accessible arts activities in the region. From the five "majors" (Oregon Ballet Theatre, Oregon Symphony, Portland Art Museum, Portland Center Stage, and Portland Opera) to smaller and emerging groups like Oregon Children's Theatre, Literary Arts, Portland Institute for Contemporary Art (PICA), PlayWrite, and Write Around Portland, RACC funding provides approximately 1 to 5% of most local arts organizations' total budgets. RACC also funds a number of individual artists each year.

RACC provides resources for artists through its website and several newsletters (both printed and electronic). RACC provides several technical assistance programs, including workshops for artists, and convenes public forums and other meetings to discuss important arts and culture issues in the community. In 2004, RACC launched a workplace giving program for arts and culture called Work for Art to raise additional funds for local arts organizations. The agency launched a public-private initiative as a gap filler for schools lacking art teachers called The Right Brain Initiative at an expense to the district of $15 per child.

== Budget and funding ==
The organization receives funding from the city budget, but unlike a city bureau, it is governed by its own private governing board. In 2018, Portland Mayor Ted Wheeler and then commissioner Nick Fish asked the city auditor's office to investigate if RACC was meeting its contractual obligations with the city. The city's senior management auditor Jenny Scott reported "The city has no clear goals for arts and culture." Scott described the situation as "there’s little oversight at the city of how RACC spends its money."

IN 2022, the city funded $7.4 million out of RACC's $10.6 million through Arts Tax and general funds. The City of Portland announced via commissioner Dan Ryan that the city will be terminating the funding in July 2024.

The city says the organization failed to produce the list of grant recipients, contact information, and the contracts that were requested by the city.
