= Lewis and Clark Memorial Column =

Monument commemorating Lewis and Clark in Portland, Oregon

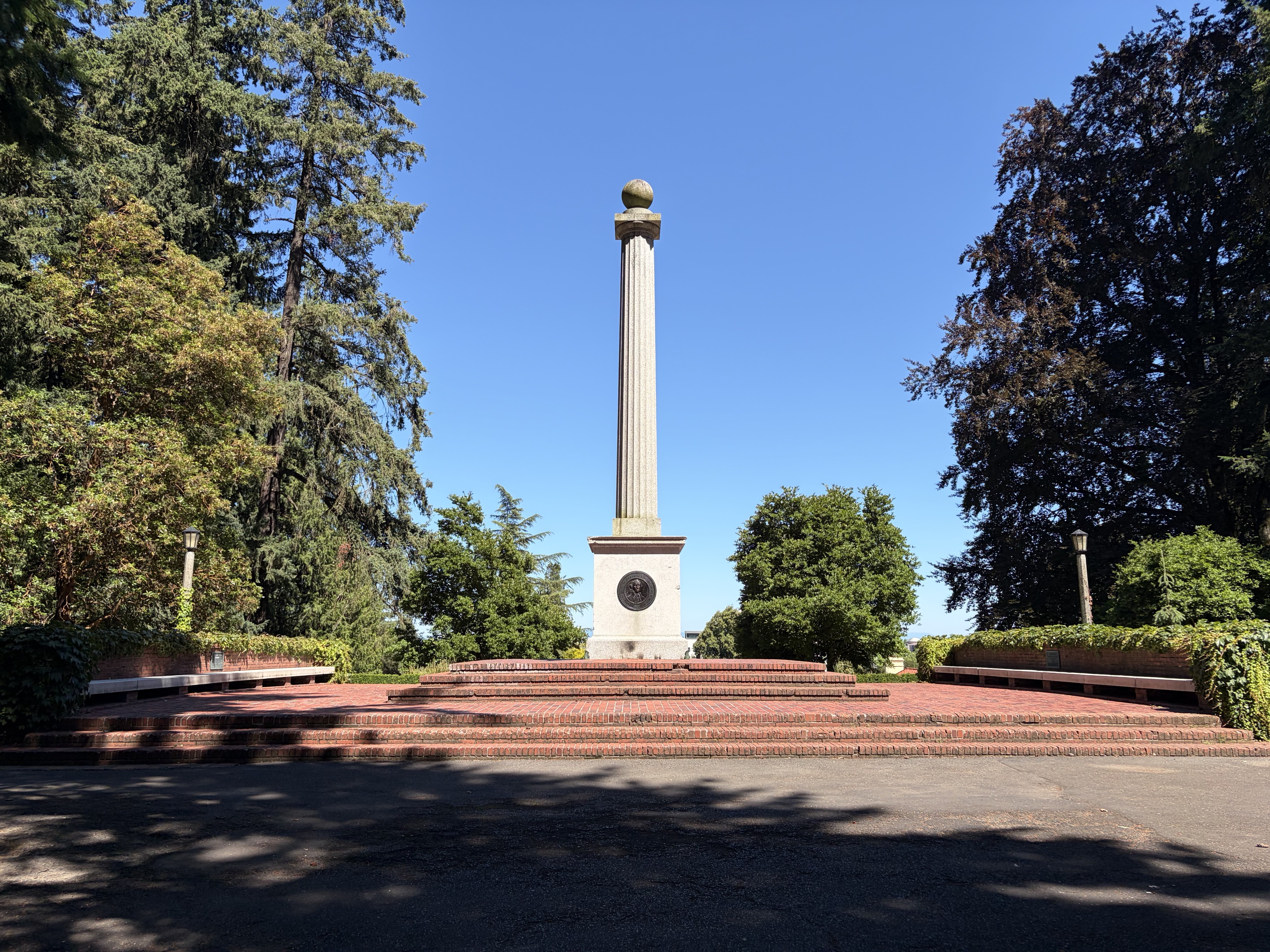
- The sculpture in 2026, viewed from the west
- Year: 1908
- Type: Sculpture
- Medium: Snake River granite, bronze
- Dimensions: 10.5 m (34.5 ft); 0.76 m diameter (2.5 ft)
- Condition: "Well maintained" (1993)
- Location: Portland, Oregon, United States; 45°31′17″N 122°42′05″W
- Owner: City of Portland's Metropolitan Arts Commission

The Lewis and Clark Memorial Column is an outdoor monument in Portland, Oregon. Located in Washington Park, it was designed by artist Otto Schumann and is dedicated to Meriwether Lewis and William Clark for their expedition which passed through Portland approximately 100 years prior to the monument's construction.

The work is owned by the City of Portland and is currently administered by the Metropolitan Arts Commission.

== Description ==
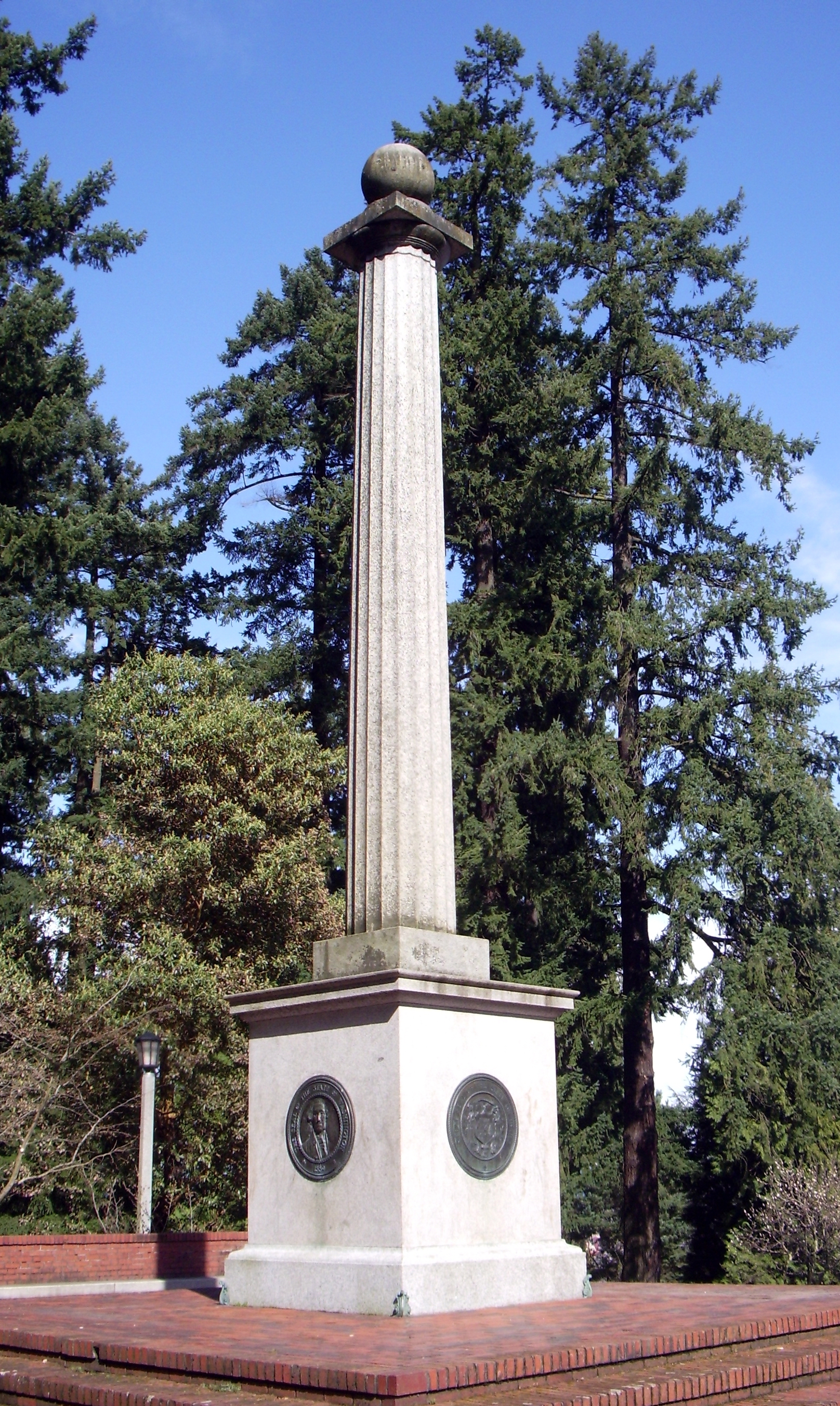
The monument in 2006

The sculpture, made of Snake River granite, is a Classical column with a sphere on top. It is approximately 34 feet, 6 inches tall, with a diameter of 2.5 feet. An illuminated path leads up the monument, which sits on a square base that is approximately 5 feet, 5 inches tall. The base's sides display bronze seals for the states of Oregon, Washington, Idaho and Montana, which once comprised the Oregon Territory:

North panel features the Seal of Montana

East panel that faces downtown Downtown Portland features the Seal of Oregon and a plaque at the bottom is inscribed with (centered on the panel):

ERECTED BY THE CITIZENS OF OREGON TO COMMEMORATE THE ACHIEVEMENTS OF CAPTAINS MERIWETHER LEWIS AND WILLIAM CLARK WHO WITH THE ENCOURAGEMENT AND UNDER THE DIRECTION OF THE PRESIDENT OF THE UNITED STATES THOMAS JEFFERSON STARTED FROM ST LOUIS MAY 14 1804 AND THROUGH MANY HARDSHIPS PENETRATED THE VAST CONTINENTAL WILDERNESS TO THE PACIFIC OCEAN AT THE MOUTH OF THE COLUMBIA RIVER AND RETURNING SEPTEMBER 1806 GAVE TO THE PIONEERS A PATHWAY AND TO THE NATION THE OREGON COUNTRY

South panel features the Seal of Washington
West panel features the Seal of Idaho

=== Additional memorials ===
A wall with built in benches surrounds the monument. Each of the walls contain plaques dedicated to the two men who served as president of the Lewis & Clark Exposition Commission, Henry W. Corbett and Henry W. Goode.

A 1998 plaque, located at the base of the stairs up to the monument, commemorates Amos Nahum King, a prominent landowner who sold the land that became Washington Park to the city for what was considered a "considerable bargain." The Arlington Heights and Hillside (occasionally referred to as King's Heights) neighborhoods, as well as Macleay Park, were also part of his estate.

Also located nearby is the statue of Sacajawea and Jean-Baptiste, and the statue Coming of the White Man which depicts Chief Multnomah and another Native overlooking the Columbia River upon the arrival of Lewis & Clark.

== History ==
The memorial was commissioned around 1902 by the Lewis & Clark Exposition Commission for approximately $10,500 as a "gift of the people of Oregon in memory" of the duo. President Theodore Roosevelt laid the first cornerstone on May 21, 1903. Despite the initial plans to have the memorial completed in time for the Exposition, construction was delayed and the piece was completed and dedicated in 1908.

In the 1960s, the memorial had become a target of vandalism. Local longshoreman and amateur preservationist Francis J. Murnane lobbied the Portland City Commission to restore the monument. The city repaired the monument and continues to maintain it to this day. It was surveyed and considered "well maintained" by Smithsonian's "Save Outdoor Sculpture!" program in November 1993.

== See also ==
- 1908 in art
- Captain William Clark Monument, University of Portland
- Lewis and Clark (sculpture), Salem, Oregon
- Sacajawea and Jean-Baptiste (1905), Portland, Oregon
