= Stearns Canyon =

Canyon in Portland, Oregon

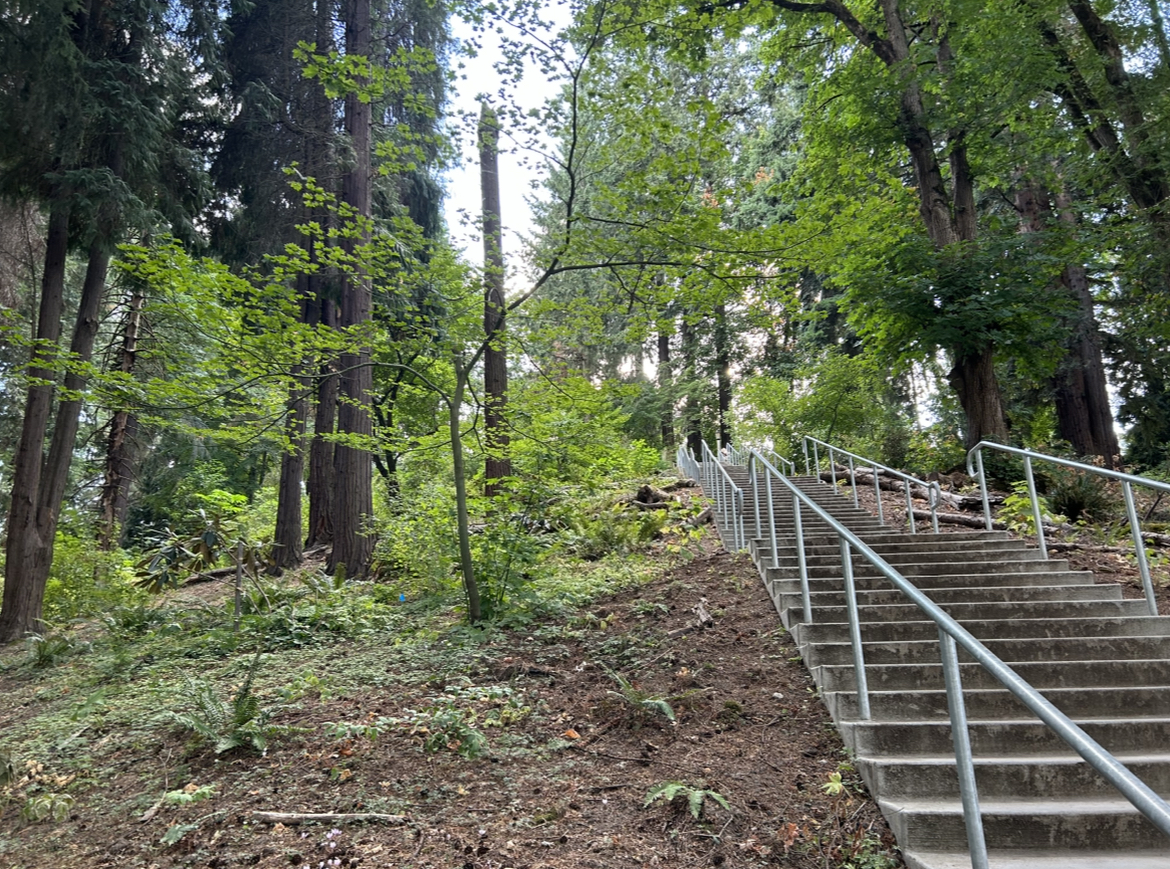
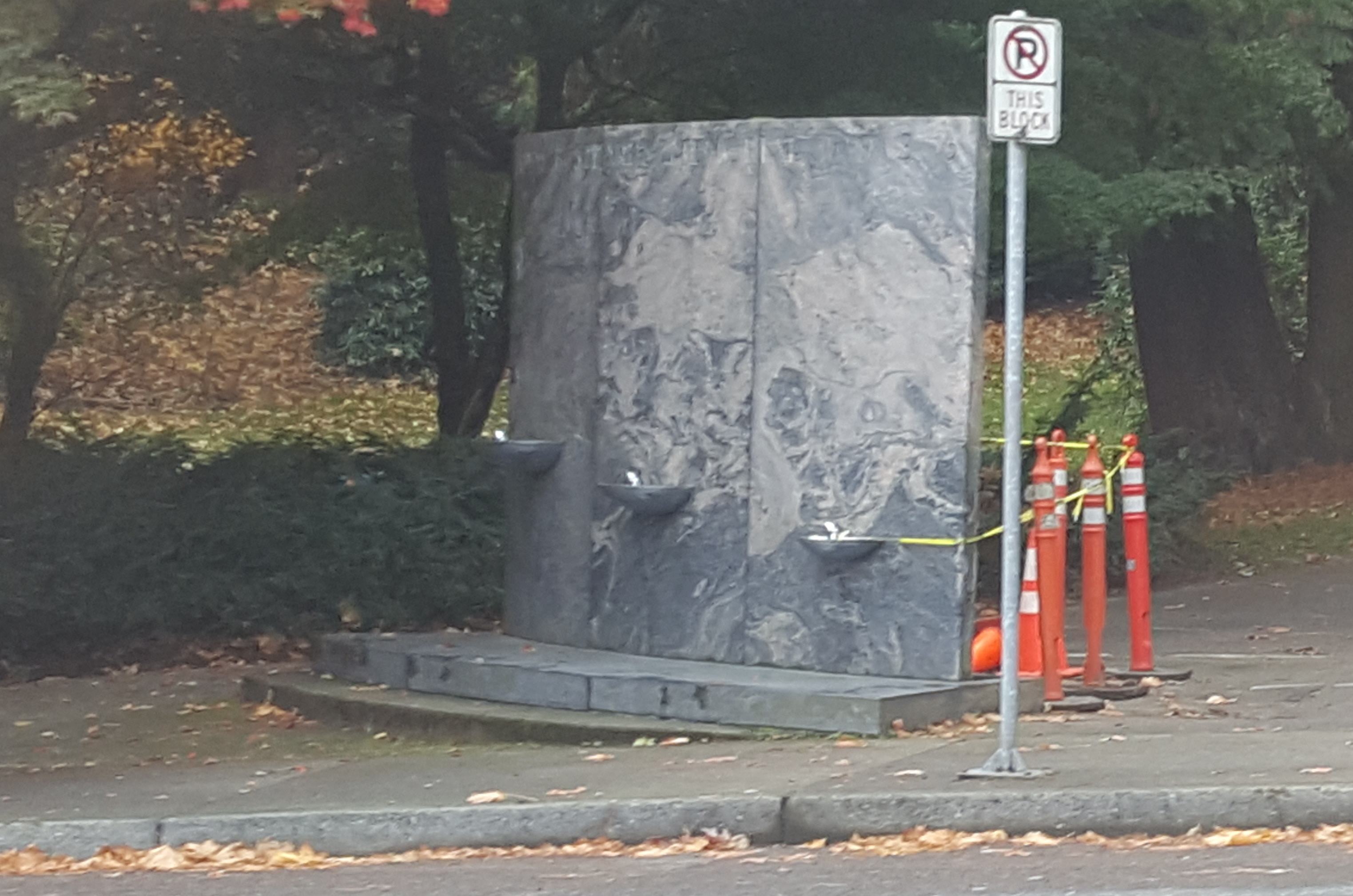
- Top: A set of stairs in Stearns Canyon, Bottom: Loyal B. Stearns Memorial Fountain

- Location within Oregon

Geography
- Coordinates: 45°31′25.6″N 122°42′3.8″W
- Interactive map of Stearns Canyon

Stearns Canyon is a small canyon located in Portland, Oregon, primarily within Washington Park. It cuts its way south through the Tualatin Mountains from Burnside Street, approximately 1 mile south into the park.

The canyon used to belong to Amos King, who sold 40 acres of his property, including the canyon, to the City of Portland 1871 for the use of a public park, now called Washington Park.

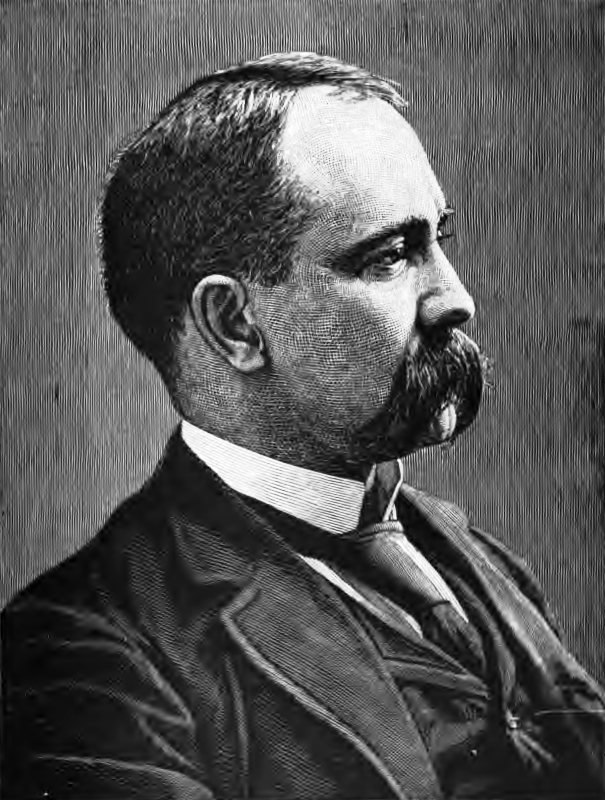
Judge and State Representative Loyal B. Stearns, the namesake of the canyon.

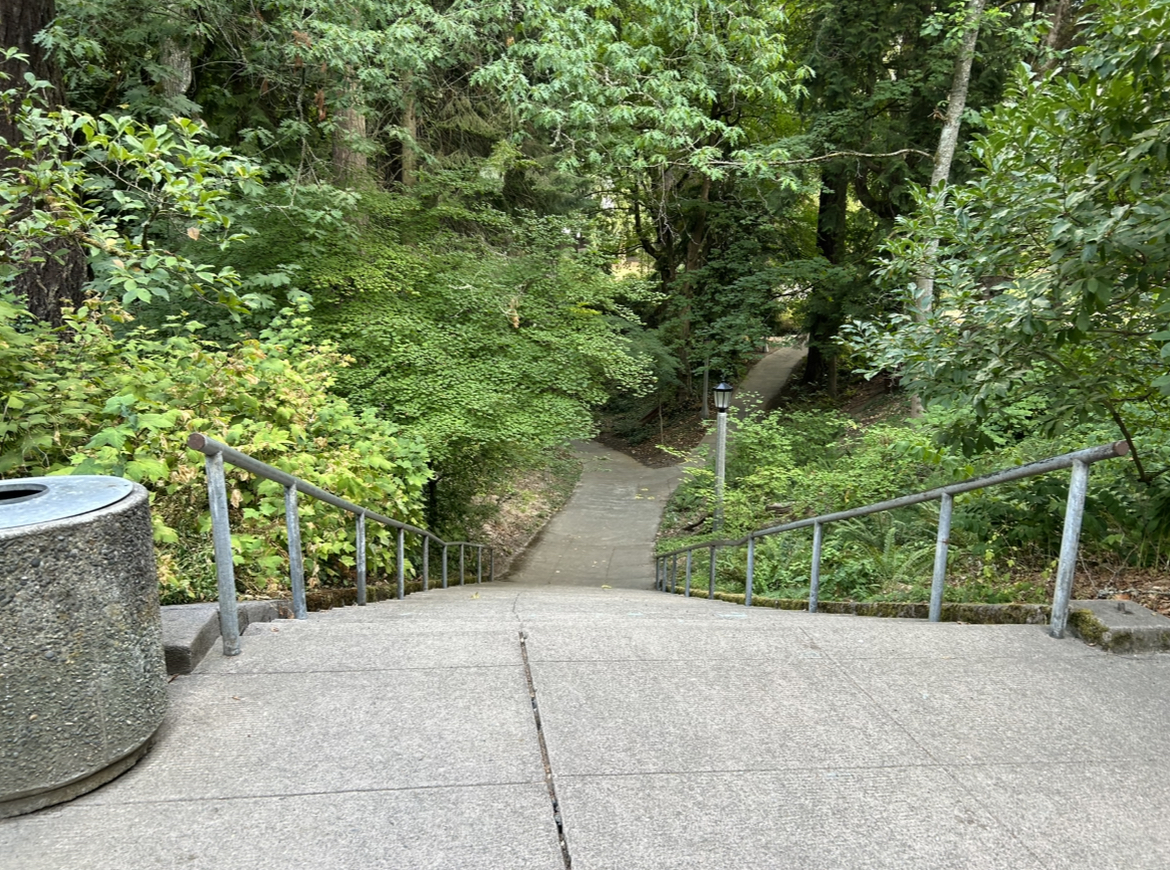

Stearns Canyon is named for Oregon judge and State Representative Loyal B. Stearns and the Loyal B. Stearns Memorial Fountain is located at the northern mouth of the canyon. The canyon is also home to multiple hiking trails and the Himalayan Cloud Forest Garden.

== See also ==
- Himalayan Cloud Forest Garden
- Washington Park
