= Sarah A. Evans =

American clubwoman and suffragist

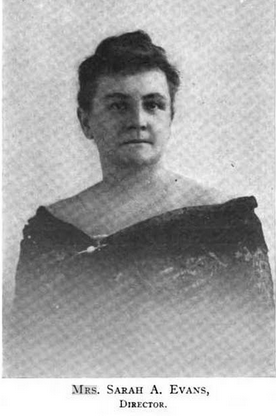
- Sarah Ann Shannon
- Born: Mrs. Sarah A. Evans, from a 1909 publication. 1854; Bedford, Pennsylvania
- Died: December 8, 1940 (aged 85–86)
- Education: Lutherville Female Seminary
- Spouse: William M. Evans (m. 1873)

Sarah Ann Shannon Evans (1854 — December 8, 1940) was an American clubwoman and suffragist based in Portland, Oregon, president of the Oregon Federation of Women's Clubs from 1905 to 1915. She was the first woman in Portland to carry a police badge, in her work as the city's first Market Inspector. She also worked for state funding of free public libraries in Oregon.

== Early life ==
Sarah Ann Shannon was born in Bedford, Pennsylvania, the daughter of Oliver Shannon and Mary Virginia Washabaugh Shannon. Her father was a lawyer. She was educated at the Lutherville Female Seminary in Maryland.

== Career ==
Sarah Ann Evans moved to Portland with her husband and children in 1893. She was a founding member of the Portland Woman's Club, the Portland YWCA, and of the Oregon Federation of Women's Clubs in 1899. She was president of the Federation from 1905 to 1915. During her presidency, Oregon women won the vote (in 1912). She wrote a weekly column on women's concerns in the Oregon Journal newspaper. She was also active in the state's League of Women Voters when that was established.

When suffragist Abigail Scott Duniway spoke at the Oregon Federation of Women's Clubs meeting in 1913, she summarized Evans's club career to date:

When Mrs. Sarah A. Evans, the faithful and able presiding officer of this Federation took the chair eight years ago, we had less than a dozen affiliated clubs to call upon for assistance. Today we have sixty Clubs in the Federation, all working in harmony, along the lines of social, domestic, educational, philanthropic and civic improvements, giving tangible proof of her executive ability and your loyalty. Her formative work is finished. Whether she may or may not be chosen to again succeed herself, her arduous labors as a pioneer are completed.

She worked for a state tax to support free public libraries, and for enforcement of child labor laws. She also raised funds and support for a bronze statue of Sacajawea and Jean-Baptiste by artist Alice Cooper, erected in the city on the occasion of the Lewis and Clark Centennial Exposition in 1905. Also in 1905 she was appointed City Market Inspector for Portland, a position she worked to establish, and which made her the first female member of the city's police force. During World War I Evans led the public health committee of the Oregon Federation of Women's Clubs, and led fundraising with the first Liberty Loan drive in Oregon in 1917. She also founded a cooking school in the city.

== Personal life ==
Sarah Ann Shannon married William M. Evans in 1873. They had three daughters, Laura, Gertrude, and Elizabeth. Sarah was widowed when William died in 1917. Evans was injured in a car accident in 1934, and died in 1940, aged 86 years.
