= Sarah Evans =

Sarah Evans may refer to:

- Sarah Lindsay Evans (1816–1898), English-born South Australian pioneer and temperance activist
- Sarah A. Evans (1854–1940), American clubwoman and suffragist
- Sarah Haycroft (born 1991), née Evans, English field hockey player
- Sarah Louise Keys (1928–2023), married name Evans, African American army veteran and civil rights activist

== See also ==
- Sara Evans (born 1971), American country music singer, songwriter, and record producer
- Sara M. Evans (born 1943), American historian and author
