= Barbara Walker Crossing =

Footbridge in Portland, Oregon, U.S.

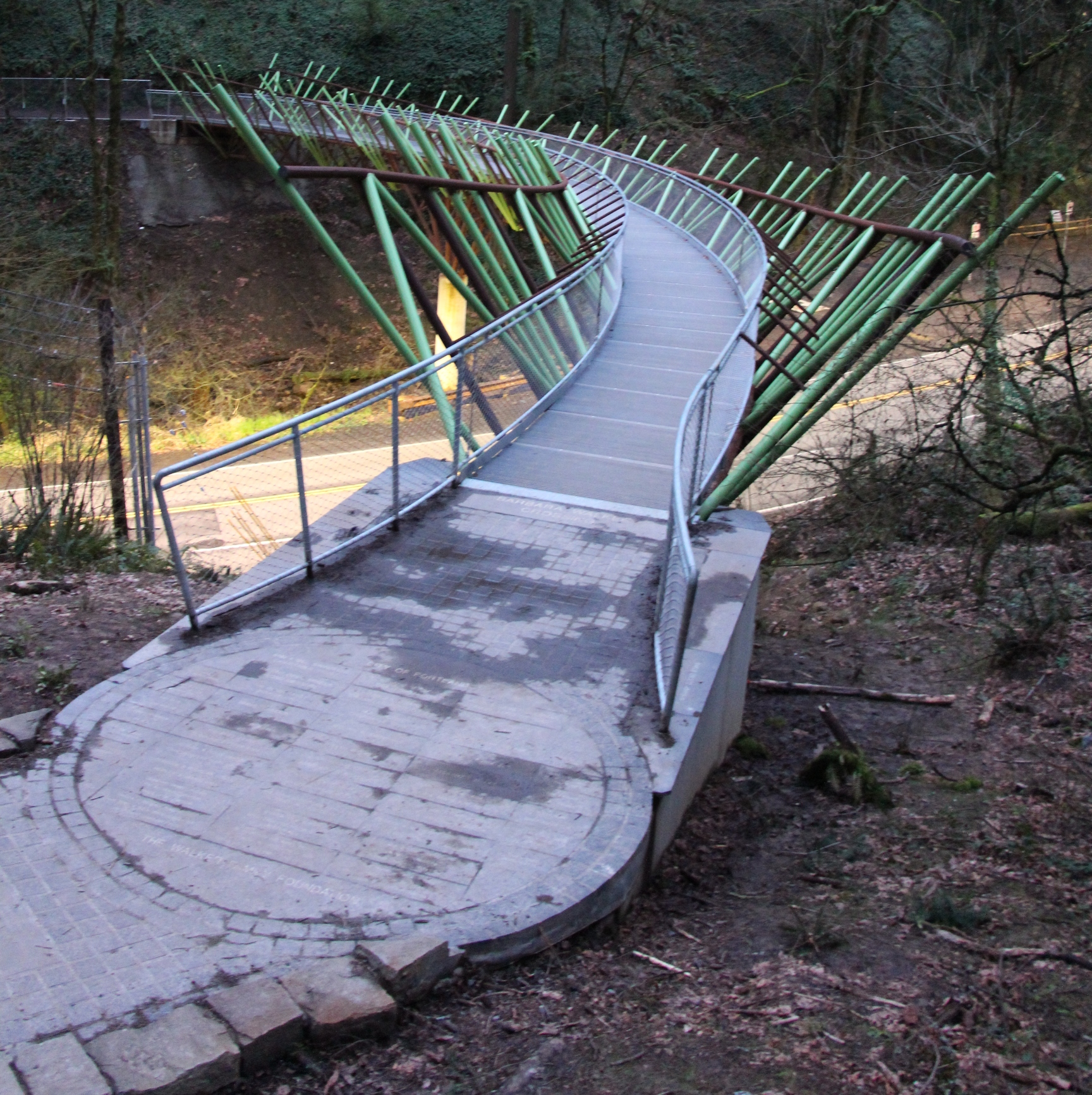
- The north end of the bridge, 2020
- Coordinates: 45.52163°N 122.71854°W
- Carries: Pedestrians
- Crosses: West Burnside Street
- Locale: Portland, Oregon, U.S.
- Other name(s): Wildwood Trail Bridge
- Named for: Barbara Walker
- Owner: Portland Parks & Recreation

Characteristics
- Design: Trichord truss
- Material: Steel
- Total length: 180 feet (55 m)

History
- Construction cost: $4.05 million
- Opened: October 2019

Barbara Walker Crossing is a footbridge carrying the Wildwood Trail across West Burnside Street to connect Portland, Oregon's Forest Park and Washington Park.

== Description ==
Barbara Walker Crossing is a 180-foot (55 m) steel footbridge connecting Forest Park and Washington Park, carrying the Wildwood Trail across West Burnside Street. The bridge was designed by Ed Carpenter and named for Barbara Walker, a parks advocate who died in 2014. It cost $4.05 million to construct, with 63 percent of the cost covered by private donations and the remaining $1.3 million from the city government's general fund. The bridge was designed to carry 50 tons, with a 74-ton maximum load.

The bridge was built for the Portland Parks Foundation, before ownership was transferred to Portland Parks & Recreation. Joseph Gallivan of the Portland Tribune described the bridge as "striking for its green spikes, which vaguely resemble ferns or evergreen needles."

== History ==
Various groups worked toward the goal of building a bridge, initially known as the Wildwood Trail bridge, across Burnside Street for approximately 30 years. Stakeholders sought to create "a safe, continuous, delicate, iconic bridge that fits the site aesthetic, which could be constructed off-site, installed with minimal disruption, and prove cost-effective".

Carpenter worked with Portland's KPFF Consulting Engineers, who confirmed that a single piling was sufficient to support the bridge. R&H Construction was hired for installation, and the Portland Bureau of Transportation ensured that permit procedures were followed.

=== Construction ===
The bridge was constructed at Supreme Steel in Portland's Parkrose neighborhood. It was separated into three pieces before being transported to the installation site over five days. The three pieces, south to north, weighed 10, 5.5, and 8 tons, respectively. The street was closed for two days during installation. One project manager for R&H Construction described the challenges of the bridge's installation:

A tight worksite with heavy traffic that doesn't always obey the posted reduced speed limits around the construction site. Also, working with large bridge sections that are not only in a 'V' shape, but also on a 150-degree radius, requires extensive preplanning in order to erect each section safely.

The bridge was installed in October 2019, and a grand opening ceremony was held on October 27. It is expected to be used by 80,000 people annually.
