= Shakespeare Memorial (Portland, Oregon) =

1946 monument to William Shakespeare

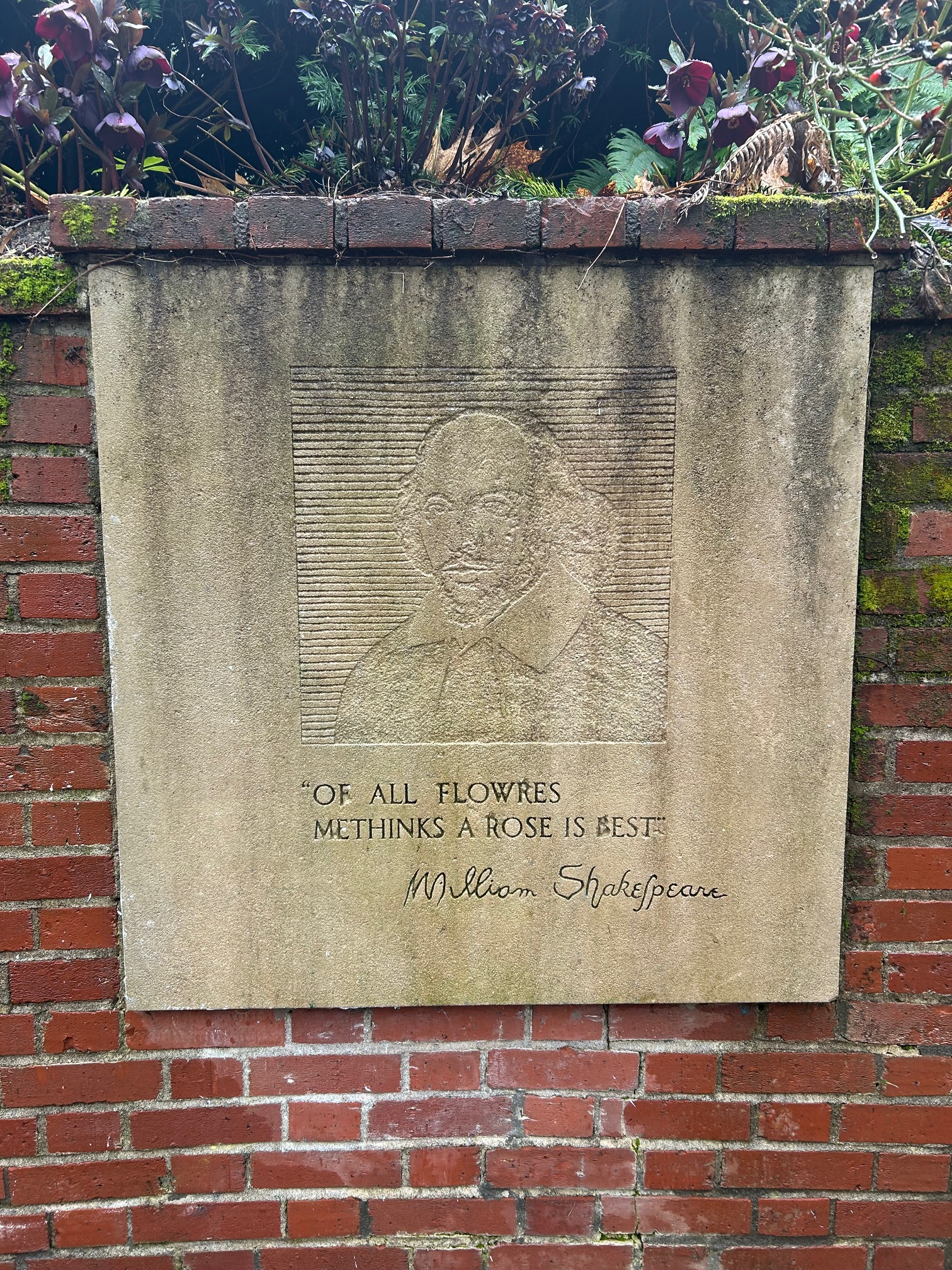
- Interactive map of Shakespeare Memorial
- Location: Washington Park, Portland, Oregon, United States
- Coordinates: 45°31′6.825″N 122°42′17.553″W
- Designer: Glenn Stanton and Florence Gerke
- Material: Concrete (plaque); Brick (wall)
- Height: 20 feet 2 inches (6.15 m)
- Completion date: 1946
- Dedicated date: April 23, 1946
- Dedicated to: William Shakespeare

The Shakespeare Memorial is a monument honoring poet and playwright William Shakespeare located in Portland, Oregon, United States. It is located within the Shakespeare Garden, which is a part of the International Rose Test Garden in Washington Park. The memorial is a brick wall with a plaque engraved with Shakespeare's portrait. The plaque also features a quote from Shakespeare: "of all flowres, methinks a rose is best," followed by his signature. It was gifted to Portland by the LaBarre Shakespeare Club in April 1946.

== See also ==
- 1946 in art
- Memorials to William Shakespeare
