= Loyal B. Stearns =

American politician

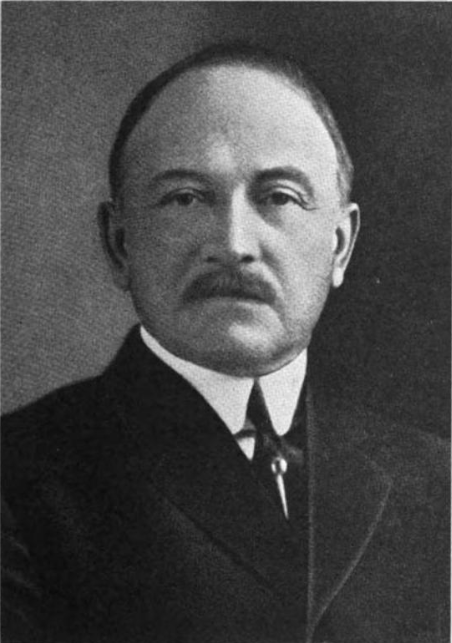

Member of the Oregon House of Representatives

Member of the U.S. House of Representatives from 's 38th district
- In office 1878–1879
- Preceded by: William Porter
- Succeeded by: Tilmon Ford
- Constituency: Multnomah County

Personal details
- Born: May 2, 1853 Swanzey, New Hampshire, U.S.
- Died: June 2, 1936 (aged 83)
- Party: Republican
- Spouse: Mary Frances Hoyt
- Education: Willamette University
- Occupation: Attorney

Loyal B. Stearns (May 2, 1853 – June 2, 1936) was an American politician, attorney, and jurist in Oregon. Born in New Hampshire and raised in Oregon, he became a lawyer and practiced in Portland. A Republican, he was a member of the Oregon House of Representatives and later a judge for several courts.

== Early life ==
Loyal Stearns was born to Daniel W. Stearns and Almira Stearns (nee Fay) on May 2, 1853. One of five children, he was born in Swanzey, New Hampshire, and sailed with his family that year via the Isthmus of Panama route to San Francisco, California. In 1854, they continued north to the Oregon Territory. There they settled in Southern Oregon in Scottsburg. The younger Stearns was educated in Roseburg at the local schools and at Umpqua Academy. He also traveled around the state and into Idaho while working with his merchant father.

In 1871, Stearns relocated north to Portland where he attended Bishop Scott Academy until 1872. Stearns then enrolled at the Willamette University College of Medicine in Salem, Oregon, for one term before leaving to study law. He read law under the guidance of A. C. Gibbs and William Ball Gilbert at their law firm in Portland beginning in 1873. In December 1876, he passed the bar and began practicing law in Portland. Stearns started as a partner of Gibbs before practicing on his own.

== Political career ==
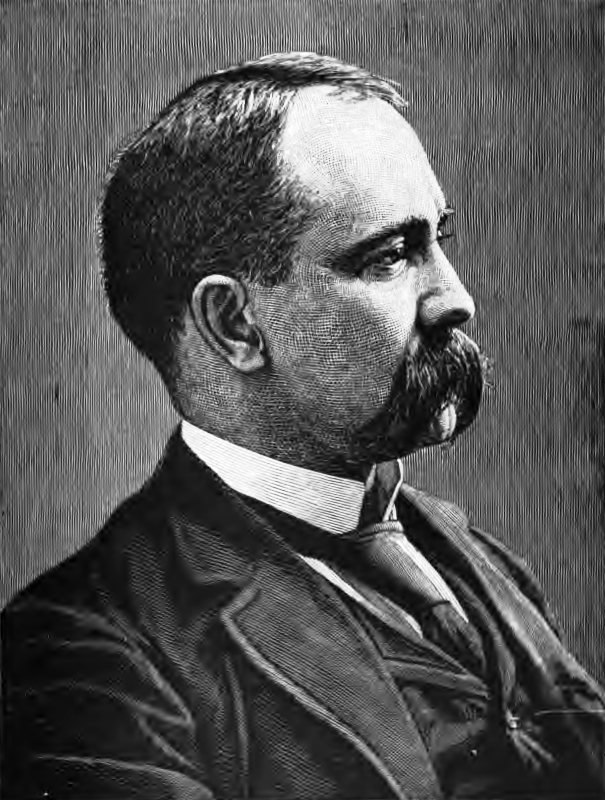
Stearns in 1892

Stearns was elected to the Oregon House of Representatives in 1878 as a Republican. He represented District 38 which at that time was located entirely within Multnomah County, and included Portland. His father Daniel Stearns served in the House previously, and then served in the state senate following Loyal's one session in the Oregon Legislative Assembly. Loyal Stearns then served as Portland’s police judge from January 1879 to 1882 followed by election to the office of city attorney. After a short time in that position, he was elected to a seat on Multnomah County’s court, and served from June 1882 to 1885. In 1885, he became a judge for the Oregon circuit court where he remained until 1898. Governor Zenas Ferry Moody appointed him to the position, and Stearns won election to a full-term and then re-election until retiring from the bench.

== Later years and family ==
On June 19, 1883, he married Mary Frances Hoyt, and they had one daughter together. Stearns worked in the real estate business following his judicial career. Mary, the daughter of Captain Richard Hoyt, died in 1933. Loyal Stearns died on June 2, 1936, at the age of 83.

The Loyal B. Stearns Memorial Fountain in Washington Park was built in honor of Stearns. He is also the namesake of the nearby Stearns Canyon.

== See also ==
- Loyal B. Stearns Memorial Fountain (1941)
