= Peacock in the Park =

Annual LGBT variety show in Portland, Oregon, U.S.

- Status: active
- Begins: 1987
- Ends: 2005, restarted 2014
- Frequency: annually
- Venue: Washington Park Amphitheatre
- Location: Portland, Oregon
- Country: United States

Peacock in the Park is an annual LGBTQ variety show, held at Washington Park in Portland, Oregon, in the United States. The event was founded in 1987 and ran for 18 years, until it was replaced by the Peacock After Dark event in 2005. Due to popular demand, Peacock in the Park returned in 2014. It is considered family-friendly and is free to attend. Shows feature dancers, drag performances, and live music.

Portland Monthly described Peacock in the Park as "Portland's gay equivalent of the Super Bowl: thousands from the queer spectrum flocked to Washington Park's amphitheater, spread out blankets and coolers of beer, and mingled before a stage of drag and music performances".

== See also ==
- Culture of Portland, Oregon
