= Coming of the White Man =

Sculpture in Portland, Oregon, U.S.

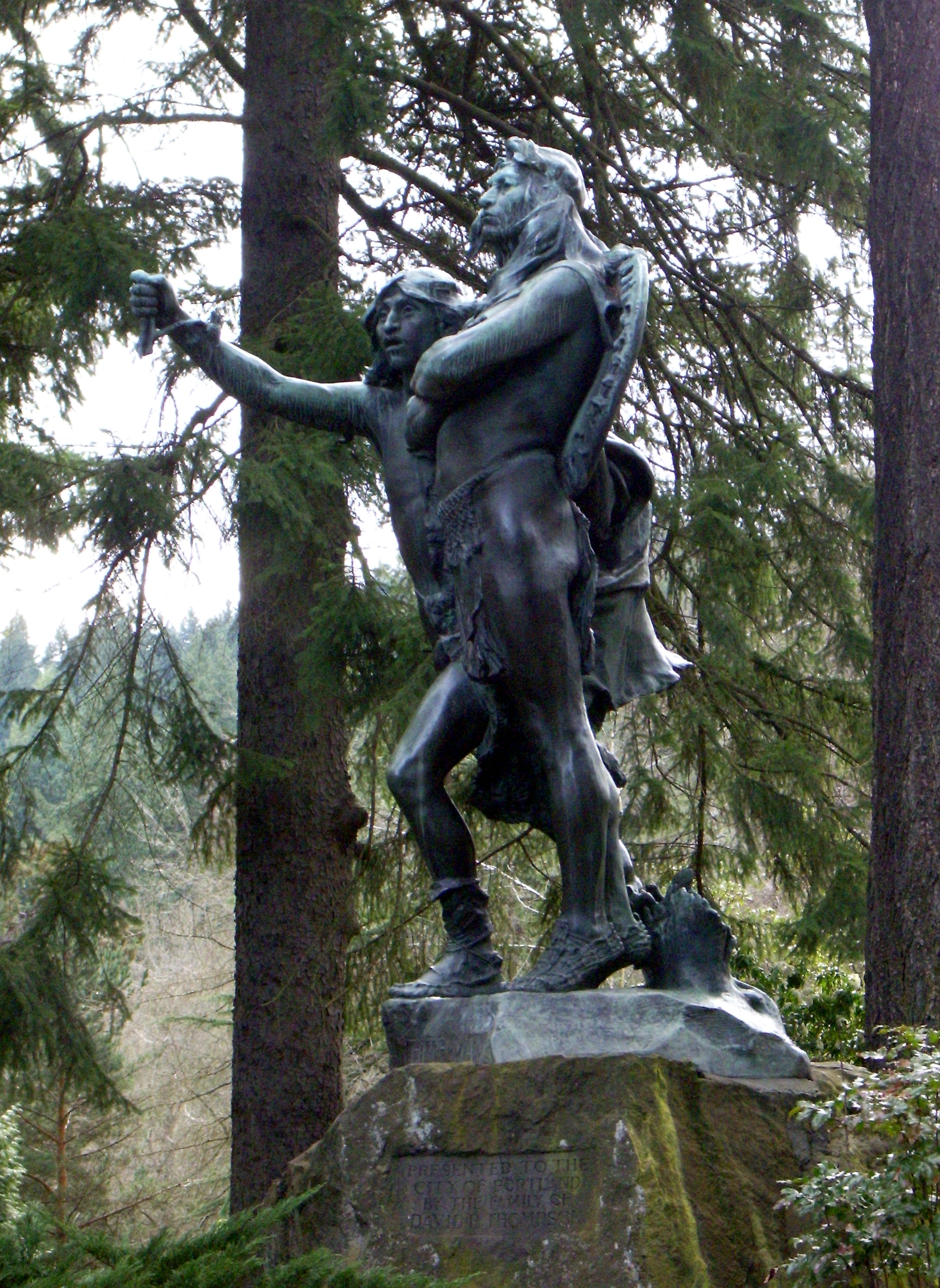
- The sculpture in 2006
- Artist: Hermon Atkins MacNeil
- Year: 1904
- Medium: Bronze sculpture
- Subject: Two Native American men, including Chief Multnomah
- Location: Portland, Oregon, United States; 45°31′23″N 122°42′12″W

Coming of the White Man, also known as the Chief Multnomah Statue, is a bronze sculpture by American artist Hermon Atkins MacNeil, installed in Washington Park, Portland, Oregon in the United States. The statue was gifted to the City of Portland in 1904 by former mayor David P. Thompson and installed the following year. It depicts two Native American men, including Chief Multnomah, looking towards the Columbia River upon the arrival of Lewis and Clark.

== Description ==
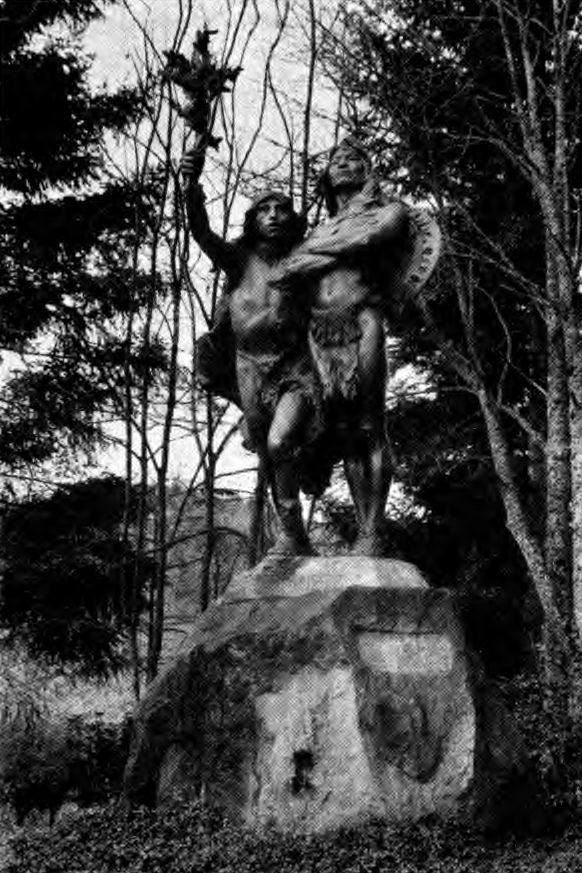
The sculpture in 1922

Coming of the White Man is a bronze sculpture designed by Hermon Atkins MacNeil (1866–1947), an American artist most known for depicting indigenous peoples of the Americas and Western pioneers. The statue is installed in Portland's Washington Park, along Southwest Washington Way. It depicts Chief Multnomah and another Native American man looking towards the Columbia River upon the arrival of Lewis and Clark. One man is shown holding branches in his lifted right arm, pointed in the direction of the approaching explorers; the other figure folds his arms in front.

According to the Regional Arts & Culture Council, which administers the work, the sculpture measures 8 feet 8 inches (2.64 m) × 6 feet (1.8 m) × 6 feet 3 inches (1.91 m) and is mounted to a stone base that measures 5 feet 6 inches (1.68 m) × 7 feet 6 inches (2.29 m) × 9 feet 6 inches (2.90 m). The irregular stone base has an inscription of the work's title. The pedestal displays the text "Presented to the City of Portland by the Family of David P. Thompson" as shown in the image.

== History ==
The statue was donated to the City of Portland in 1904 by former mayor David P. Thompson. It was installed the following year, ahead of the Lewis and Clark Centennial Exposition. A plaster cast of the sculpture, donated by MacNeil, resides in the Poppenhusen Institute in College Point, Queens, New York. Most of the branch originally held by the other man has broken off.

== See also ==
- 1904 in art
- Lewis and Clark (sculpture), Salem, Oregon
