= Loyal B. Stearns Memorial Fountain =

Fountain in Portland, Oregon

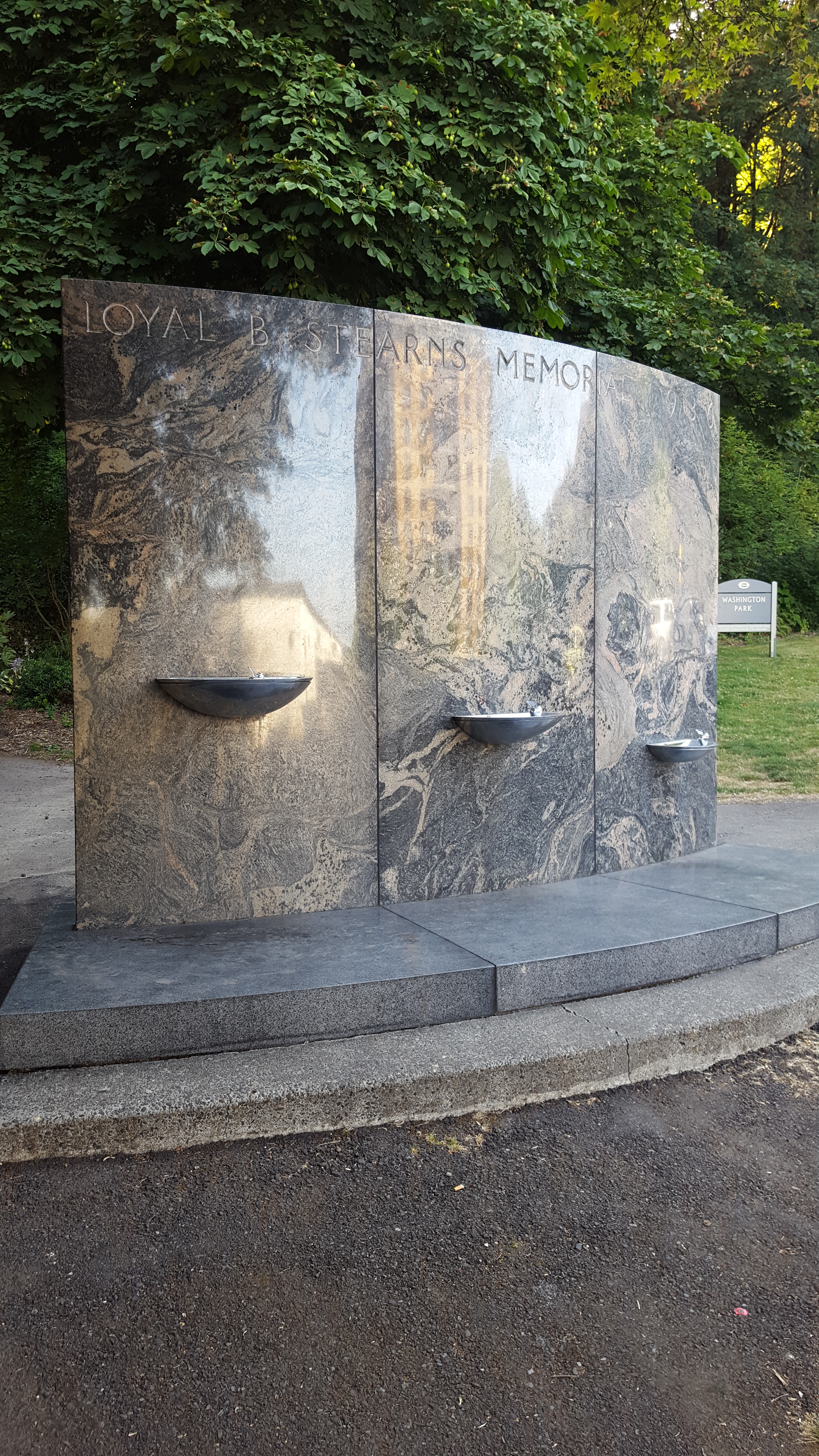
- The fountain in 2018
- Artist: A. E. Doyle and Associates
- Year: 1941
- Type: Fountain; sculpture
- Medium: Cold Springs Rainbow granite; chrome-plated brass
- Condition: "Treatment urgent" (1993)
- Location: Portland, Oregon, United States; 45.52378°N 122.70091°W
- Owner: City of Portland's Metropolitan Arts Commission

The Loyal B. Stearns Memorial Fountain, also known as the Judge Loyal B. Stearns Memorial Fountain, is an outdoor 1941 drinking fountain and sculpture by the design firm A. E. Doyle and Associates, located in Portland, Oregon. It was erected in Washington Park in honor of the former Oregon judge Loyal B. Stearns.

== Description and history ==
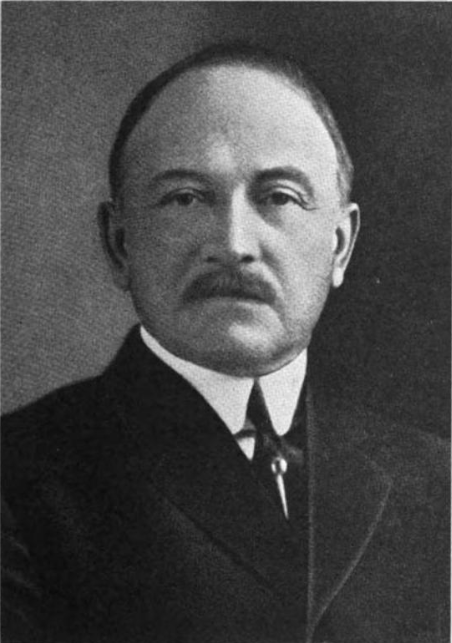
Loyal B. Stearns

The fountain, installed at 2432 West Burnside Street on the northeastern corner of Washington Park, was designed by A. E. Doyle and Associates. It was funded by a $5,000 bequest gifted to the City of Portland by attorney, jurist and politician Loyal B. Stearns for a drinking fountain on upper West Burnside Street. The design firm was selected as the winner of a contest for the fountain's design. Blaesing Granite Company served as the contractor.

The memorial consists of a slightly curved Cold Springs Rainbow granite wall with three chrome-plated brass drinking fountains at varying levels in the front, plus a trough in the rear. The fountain measures 8 feet (2.4 m), 8 inches (20 cm) x 16 feet (4.9 m), 8 inches (20 cm) x 5 feet (1.5 m), 4 inches (10 cm), and rests on a granite base which measures approximately 7 inches (18 cm) x 13.5 feet (4.1 m) x 5.5 feet (1.7 m). An inscription across the top reads: LOYAL B. STEARNS MEMORIAL 1936.

The Smithsonian Institution categorizes the sculpture as abstract ("geometric"). It was surveyed and considered "treatment urgent" by Smithsonian's "Save Outdoor Sculpture!" program in November 1993. The City of Portland's Metropolitan Arts Commission administered the memorial at that time. The city's Bureau of Planning categorized it as "Rank II" in its "Historic Resource Inventory (HRI) Properties in Public Ownership", a survey project completed in 1984.

== See also ==
- 1941 in art
- Drinking fountains in the United States
