= Washington Park (Portland, Oregon) =

Public urban park in Portland, Oregon

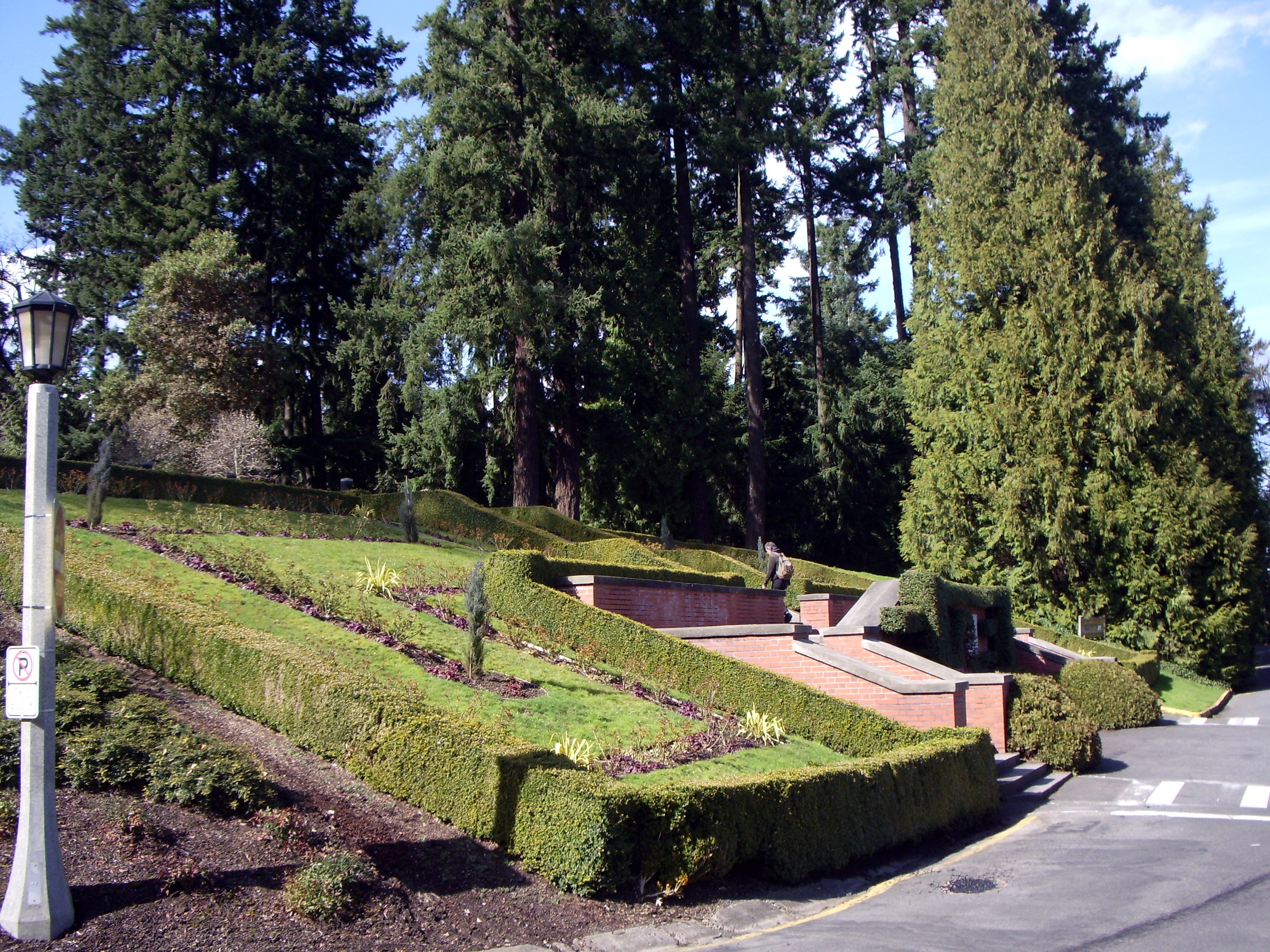
- The park's main entrance, 2006

- Location within Portland, Oregon
- Location: Portland, Oregon, U.S.
- Coordinates: 45°30′57″N 122°42′27″W
- Area: 458.45 acres (185.53 ha)
- Created: 1909
- Operator: Portland Parks & Recreation
- Public transit: MAX Light Rail at Washington Park; Bus Service; 63

Washington Park, founded in 1871, is a public urban park in Portland, Oregon, United States. It includes the Oregon Zoo, the World Forestry Center, the Hoyt Arboretum, the International Rose Test Garden, and the Portland Japanese Garden. There are several prominent memorials and public sculptures in Washington Park including the Oregon Holocaust Memorial, the Vietnam Veterans of Oregon Memorial, the Lewis and Clark Memorial Column, and a statue of Sacajawea and her son Jean-Baptiste. The Park also includes an amphitheatre, archery range, tennis courts, soccer field, picnic areas, playgrounds, and acres of wild forest with many miles of trails. There is a single underground drinking water reservoir with two aboveground reflecting pools completed in 2026 that replaced two separate drinking water reservoirs built in the 1890s.

Washington Park covers more than 458 acres (185 hectares) on mostly steep, wooded hillsides which range in elevation from 200 feet (61 m) at 24th & West Burnside Street to 870 feet (270 m) at SW Fairview Blvd. It comprises 241.45 acres (97.71 hectares) of city parkland that has been officially designated as "Washington Park" by the City of Portland, as well as the adjacent 64-acre (26 ha) Oregon Zoo and the 153-acre (62 ha) Hoyt Arboretum, which together make up the area described as "Washington Park" on signs and maps.

The park has four primary entrances, the main entrance via SW Park Place from Downtown Portland, the northwest entrance from the Arlington Heights neighborhood, the south entrance from Sunset Highway, and the now pedestrian and bike only entrance from Burnside Street on the north end of the park via Stearns Canyon which used to serve as the park's main entrance. The Washington Park MAX station is located near the Oregon Zoo, and free shuttle buses run regularly everyday connecting different parts of the Park including a stop at the MAX station.

== History ==
The City of Portland purchased the original 40.78 acres (16.50 hectares) of Washington Park in 1871 from Amos King for $32,624, a controversially high price for the time. The area, designated "City Park", was a wilderness with few roads. Thick brush, trees, and roaming cougar discouraged access. In the mid-1880s, Charles M. Meyers was hired as a park keeper. A former seaman without landscape training, he transformed the park by drawing on memories of his native Germany and European parks. By 1900, there were roads, trails, landscaped areas with lawns, manicured hedges, flower gardens, and a zoo. Cable cars were added in 1890 and operated until the 1930s. The City of Portland constructed two reservoirs in the park in 1893 and 1894.

In 1903, John Charles Olmsted of Olmsted Brothers, a nationally known landscape architecture firm, recommended several changes to the park including the present name, location of the entrance, separate roads and pedestrian paths, and replacement of formal gardens with native species. The name was officially changed from City Park to Washington Park in 1909.

When the Multnomah County Poor Farm's Hillside Farm facility west of Washington Park closed in 1922, the 160 acres (65 hectares) were sold to the City of Portland, leading to the creation of Hoyt Arboretum in 1930.

Portland's zoo was founded in Washington Park in 1888 near the north end of the park. The "bear house" from the original zoo remained in place as a historic structure for over a century, but was destroyed by a fire in 2026. The zoo moved in 1925 to what is now the site of the Japanese Garden. The only surviving structure from the second zoo is the elephant barn, now converted into a picnic shelter and decorated with tile mosaic of various animals and a life-size brick relief sculpture of an elephant and calf. The zoo moved again in 1959 to its present location at the park's southern edge.

In 1958, the Oregon Museum of Science and Industry (OMSI) moved into a new building in the southwest corner of Washington Park, adjacent to the new zoo. In 1971, the Western Forestry Center (now the World Forestry Center) opened a forestry museum north of OMSI. OMSI moved out of the park to a new location in 1992, and the Portland Children's Museum took over OMSI's former building in 2001. The Children's Museum closed in 2021.

On March 15, 2018, the Portland City Council adopted a master plan to guide the development of Washington Park over the next 20 years. The plan called for improved transportation and accessibility within the park, as well as improvements to park features such as the arboretum.

In 2016, the City of Portland began the process of replacing the two outdoor reservoirs, due to their age and a federal mandate to cover all reservoirs. The upper reservoir was replaced with a seismically reinforced underground reservoir covered by a reflecting pool, and the lower reservoir was transformed into a wildlife habitat area, bioswale, and reflecting pool. The project was completed in 2026. The $67 million project attracted opposition from historical preservationists and residents concerned about construction impacts.

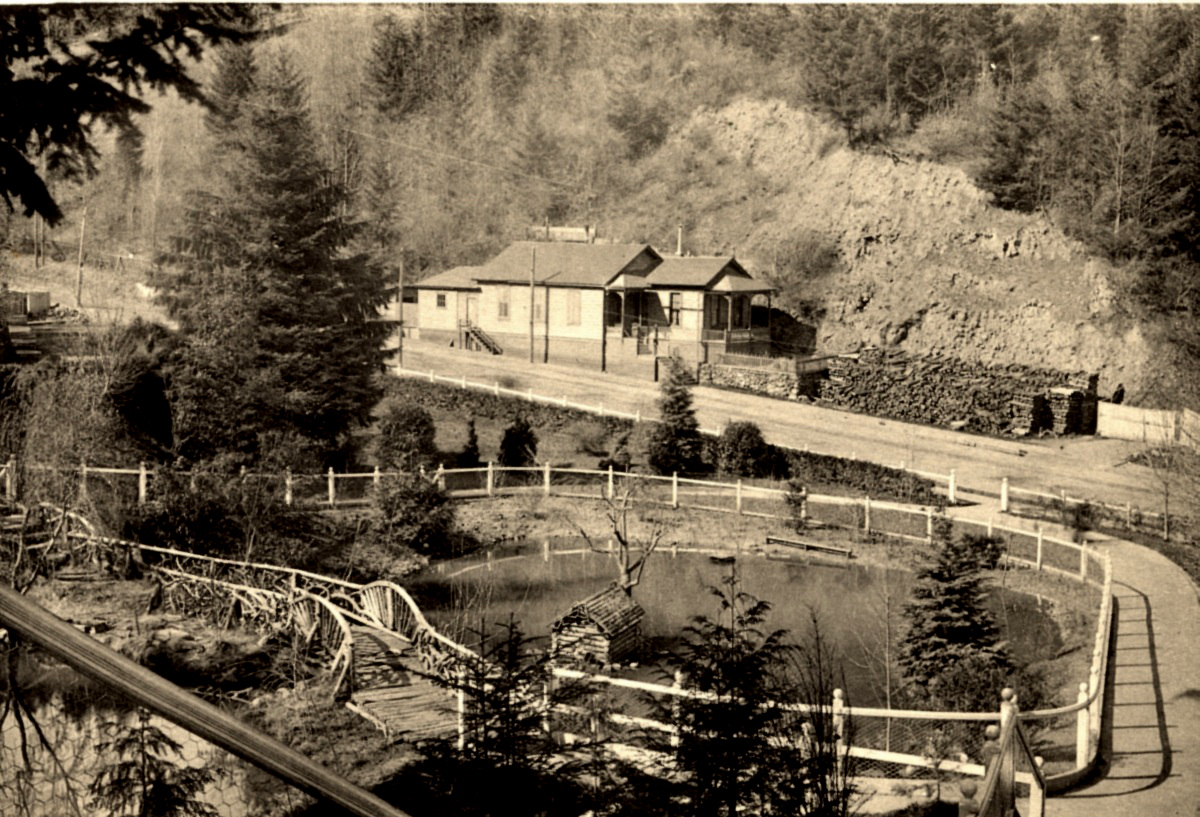
View of park entrance at Southwest Washington Street (now Burnside Street), 1898

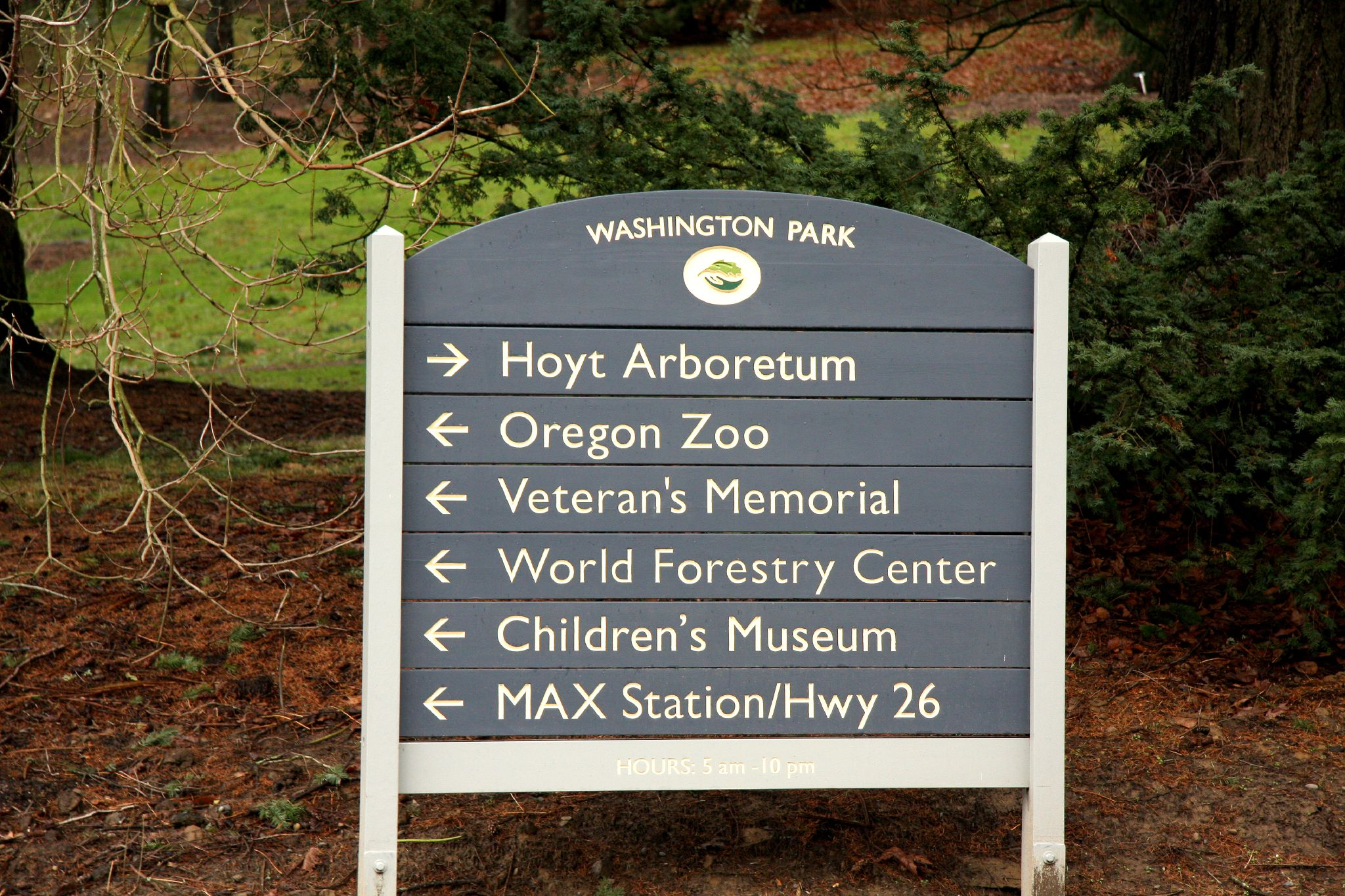
Washington Park wayfinding sign, 2007

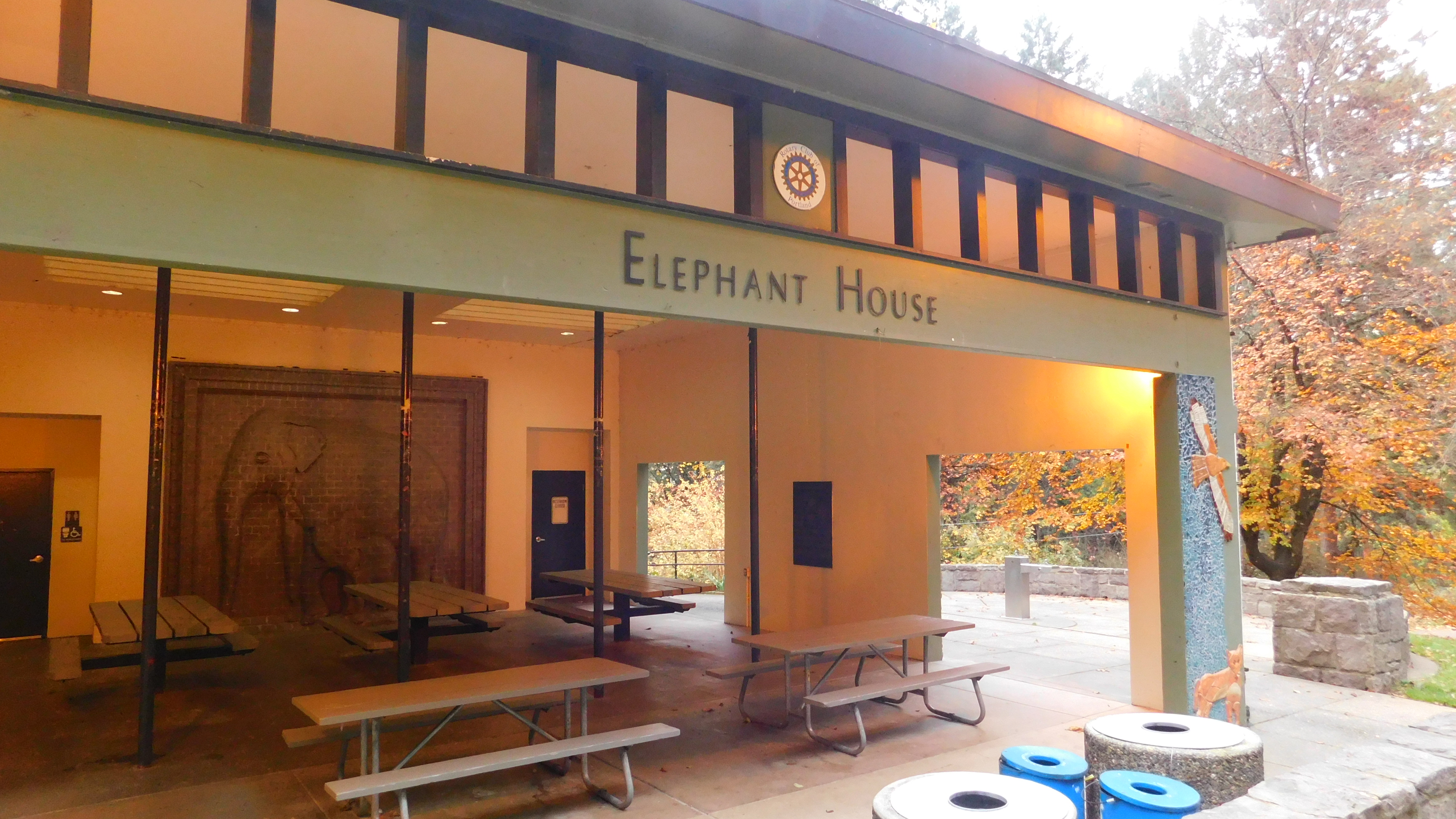
Elephant House, 2025

== Notable features ==
=== Gardens ===
| Name | Date opened | Description |
|---|---|---|
| International Rose Test Garden | 1918 | The oldest official, continuously operated, public rose test garden in the United States. Dedicated in 1924, it displays more than 10,000 rose plants of more than 650 varieties. It includes a Shakespeare garden within its boundaries and borders an alpine garden at its southern end and a secluded oval-shaped "secret garden" to the north. |
| Portland Japanese Garden | 1967 | A 9.1-acre (3.7 ha) private traditional Japanese garden that opened in 1967. It was the most highly ranked Japanese garden in North America of more than 300 such gardens rated by experts from The Journal of Japanese Gardening in 2013. |
| Himalayan Cloud Forest Garden | 2010 | A 3-acre site at the northern end of the park, displays a collection over 200 rhododendron species and hundreds of companion plants primarily from the Sino-Himalayan region. It is located in and named for Stearns Canyon, in turn named in honor of Oregon judge and state representative Loyal B. Stearns |
| Hoyt Arboretum | 1928 | Contains nearly 6,000 individual trees and shrubs of over 2,000 species on 153 acres (62 hectares) and was founded in 1928. Twelve miles (19 km) of Washington Park's trails are located in the arboretum. |

=== Museums ===
| Name | Date opened | Description |
|---|---|---|
| Oregon Zoo | 1888 | The Oregon Zoo, which opened at its current site in 1959, contains more than 2,500 animals of more than 200 species (including 15 endangered and 7 threatened species) in natural or semi-natural habitats. The zoo has a notable Asian elephant breeding program that grew out of the birth in 1962 of Packy, who in adulthood was the largest example of the species in North America. |
| Portland Children's Museum | 1946 | The Portland Children's Museum moved into the Oregon Museum of Science and Industry's former building in 2001 and closed in 2021. The Children's Museum built a substantial (1.3-acre (0.53 ha)) outdoor play area on its grounds in 2014 called "Outdoor Adventure". The Washington Park Master Plan called for Outdoor Adventure to be maintained as a public nature play area following the museum's closure. The Oregon Zoo acquired the property in 2026. |
| World Forestry Center | 1964 | The World Forestry Center Discovery Museum offers educational exhibits on forests and forest-related subjects. It was founded in 1906 in the Forestry Building of the Lewis and Clark Centennial Exposition in Northwest Portland, and later established in Washington Park in 1971. Permanent exhibits explore the traits of forests around the world. Temporary exhibits have featured art (usually related to nature), ecology, wildlife, and woodcrafts. |

=== Public Art and Memorials ===
| Name | Memorial or Monument to | Date installed/built | Sculpted/built by | Description |
|---|---|---|---|---|
| Basket of Air | | 2016 | Ivan McLean | A stainless and galvanized steel spherical sculpture by Portland artist Ivan McLean, inspired by bamboo baskets. It is suspended over the pond in the Hoyt Arboretum's Bamboo Forest and was installed in 2016. |
| Barbara Walker Crossing | Barbara Walker, Local parks advocate | 2019 | | Constructed by the City of Portland in 2019 at the northern edge of Washington Park to allow Wildwood Trail users to safely pass over West Burnside Street. |
| Chief Multnomah Memorial (Coming of the White Man) | Chief Multnomah, Chief of the Multnomah people; Namesake of Multnomah County | 1904 | Hermon Atkins MacNeil | A bronze statue of two Native Americans, one depicting Chief Multnomah, sculpted by Hermon Atkins MacNeil in 1904 and donated by the heirs of David P. Thompson. It faces east along the Oregon Trail. |
| Chiming Fountain | | 1891 | Hans Staehli | Is so-called because of the sound the falling water makes. It is an ornate concrete, bronze, and iron fountain with gargoyles. It was created in 1891 by the Swiss artisan woodcarver Hans Staehli in the style of a Renaissance fountain. It is also referred to as Washington Park Fountain, |
| The Continuity of Life Forms | | 1959 | Willard Martin | A mosaic by Portland architect and artist Willard Martin. It was originally installed at the former entrance to the Oregon Zoo (then known as the Portland Zoological Gardens) in 1959. It was re-installed outside of the zoo's new education center in July 2016, near the zoo's old entrance. |
| Flow | | 2024 | Greg A. Robinson | A large wooden medallion created by artist Greg A. Robinson. It is located near the south entrance to the park. |
| Henry Walton Goode Plaque | Henry Walton Goode, President of the Lewis and Clark Centennial Exposition (1904-1907). | 1908 | | |
| Henry Winslow Corbett Plaque | Henry Winslow Corbett, United States Senator (1867-1873); President of the Lewis and Clark Centennial Exposition (1902-1903). | 1908 | | |
| House for Summer ] | | 1987 | Helen Lessick | A living sculpture of Himalayan birch trees planted by artist Helen Lessick in the Hoyt Arboretum in 1987. The sculpture reflects the shelter of the forest canopy and changes with the seasons. Park arborists maintain the work under a joint agreement with Portland's Regional Arts and Culture Council. |
| John Reed Memorial Bench | John Reed, Author & Journalist | 2001 | | A memorial bench and plaque created to honor the Portland-born journalist John Reed. The plaque has a quotation by Reed on his native city: Portlanders understand and appreciate how differently beautiful is this part of the world—the white city against the deep evergreen of the hills, the snow mountains to the east, the ever-changing river and its boat life, the dusty oriental brilliancy of Chinatown—and the grays, blues, and greens, the smoke-dimmed sunsets and pearly hazes of August, so characteristic of the Pacific Northwest. You don’t have to point out those things to our people. |
| Les Aucoin Plaza | Les AuCoin, US Congressman | 1998 | | The Washington Park station is located beneath Les AuCoin Plaza, a scenic xeriscaped brick and stone terraced plaza located between the zoo and the World Forestry Center. |
| Lewis and Clark Memorial Column | Lewis and Clark Expedition | 1908 | Otto Schumann | A granite monument sculpted by Otto Schumann that was dedicated by President Theodore Roosevelt on May 21, 1903, to honor the discovery of the northwest by the Lewis and Clark Expedition. |
| Loyal B. Stearns Memorial Fountain | Loyal B. Stearns, State Representative & Judge | 1941 | A. E. Doyle | Erected in 1941 in honor of the former Oregon judge and state representative Loyal B. Stearns, is located in the northeastern corner of Washington Park, just south of Burnside Street at the mouth of Stearns Canyon. |
| Oregon Holocaust Memorial | Holocaust victims | 2004 | | Dedicated to the victims of the Holocaust on August 29, 2004. |
| Oregon Vietnam Veterans Memorial | Veterans of the Vietnam War | 1987 | | Dedicated in 1987 to honor Oregonians who were killed or missing in action in the Vietnam War. The monument is a spiraling path up a hill flanked by granite monuments, designed by landscape architect J. Douglas Macy. |
| Royal Rosarian | Royal Rosarians, A local Civic Organization | 2011 | Bill Bane | A bronze statue located in the Rose Garden that depicts a Royal Rosarian tipping his hat. It was created by American artist Bill Bane and dedicated in 2011. |
| Sacajawea and Jean-Baptiste Memorial (Sacajawea and Jean-Baptiste) | Sacagawea, Guide and translator to Lewis & Clark Jean Baptiste Charbonneau, her son | 1905 | Alice Cooper | A statue of the famed Shoshone Native American woman who guided the Lewis and Clark Expedition through the mountains. A massive bronze and copper piece unveiled on July 7, 1905, at the Lewis and Clark centennial, it was sculpted by Denver resident Alice Cooper and cast in New York. |
| Shakespeare Memorial | William Shakespeare | 1946 | | An engraved memorial to famous poet and playwright William Shakespeare. |

=== Other sites ===
| Name | Date opened | Description |
|---|---|---|
| Rose Garden Children's Park | 1995 | The Rose Garden Children's Park is a playground that was completed in 1995 with $2 million in donations. It includes a large, colorful play structure designed to accommodate all children, including those with disabilities. Adjacent to the Children's Park is the Elephant House picnic shelter, converted from the old zoo's elephant barn. |
| Stearns Canyon | | Stearns Canyon used to serve as the main entrance to the park but now serves as a pedestrian/bike only entrance from Burnside Street. The Stearns Himalayan Cloud Forest Garden is located within Stearns Canyon. |
| Washington Park Amphitheater | 1941 | The Washington Park Amphitheater is located in the Rose Garden and hosts many public concerts, including the Washington Park Summer Festival, an annual free concert series normally presented in August. |
| Washington Park MAX Station | 1998 | The Washington Park station is located beneath Les AuCoin Plaza, a scenic xeriscaped brick and stone terraced plaza located between the zoo and the World Forestry Center. The Washington Park Station is the only underground stop on the MAX Light Rail system and at 260 feet (79 m) below ground is the deepest transit station in North America. The station is accessed by four high-speed elevators. It opened for service on September 12, 1998. |
| Washington Park and Zoo Railway | 1958 | 1950s-era, 2 ft 6 in (762 mm) narrow gauge railroad designed to carry passengers on a 2-mile (3.2 km) line between the Rose Garden and the zoo. It was opened in phases from 1958 to 1960. Currently, it is partially closed because of needed maintenance on retaining walls and culverts as it runs through the woods; until that work is done, it operates only within the zoo. |

=== Trails ===
Washington Park has over 15 miles (24 km) of trails, some of which are part of the 40-Mile Loop connecting Washington Park with Pittock Mansion and Forest Park to the north and Council Crest to the south. The Wildwood Trail through Forest Park begins in Washington Park near the Oregon Vietnam Veterans Memorial. In 2019, the City of Portland constructed Barbara Walker Crossing at the northern edge of Washington Park to allow Wildwood Trail users to safely pass over West Burnside Street.

== Public access ==
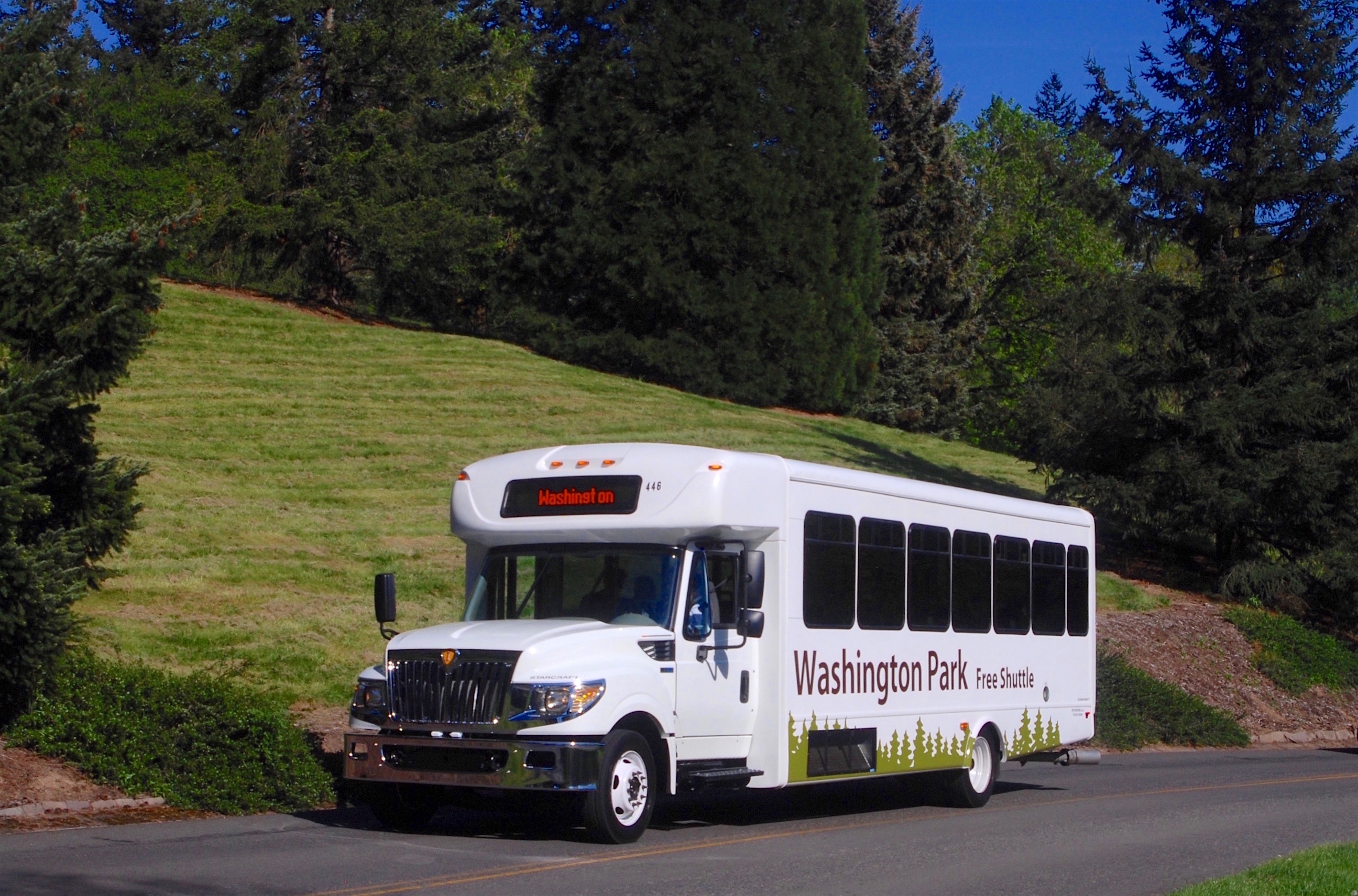
The Washington Park Shuttle is free and runs seven days a week, year-round.

Parking in Washington Park costs $2.40 per hour, to a maximum of $9.60 per day. The Washington Park light rail station provides regional public transit access to the park's west end, including the Oregon Zoo. Public transit service within the park is provided by the Washington Park Shuttle, a free service that connects with MAX light rail at the Washington Park station and since 2022 operates seven days a week year-round. Additionally, TriMet bus route 63-Washington Park/Arlington Heights, which has operated seven days a week and year-round and serves stops at the east end of the park (including at the Rose Garden and Japanese Garden. The northeastern corner of the park, at NW 23rd Place and W. Burnside, is served by bus route 20-Burnside/Stark, which runs seven days a week.

== See also ==
- Peacock in the Park
