= Alice Cooper (sculptor) =

American sculptor (1875–1937)

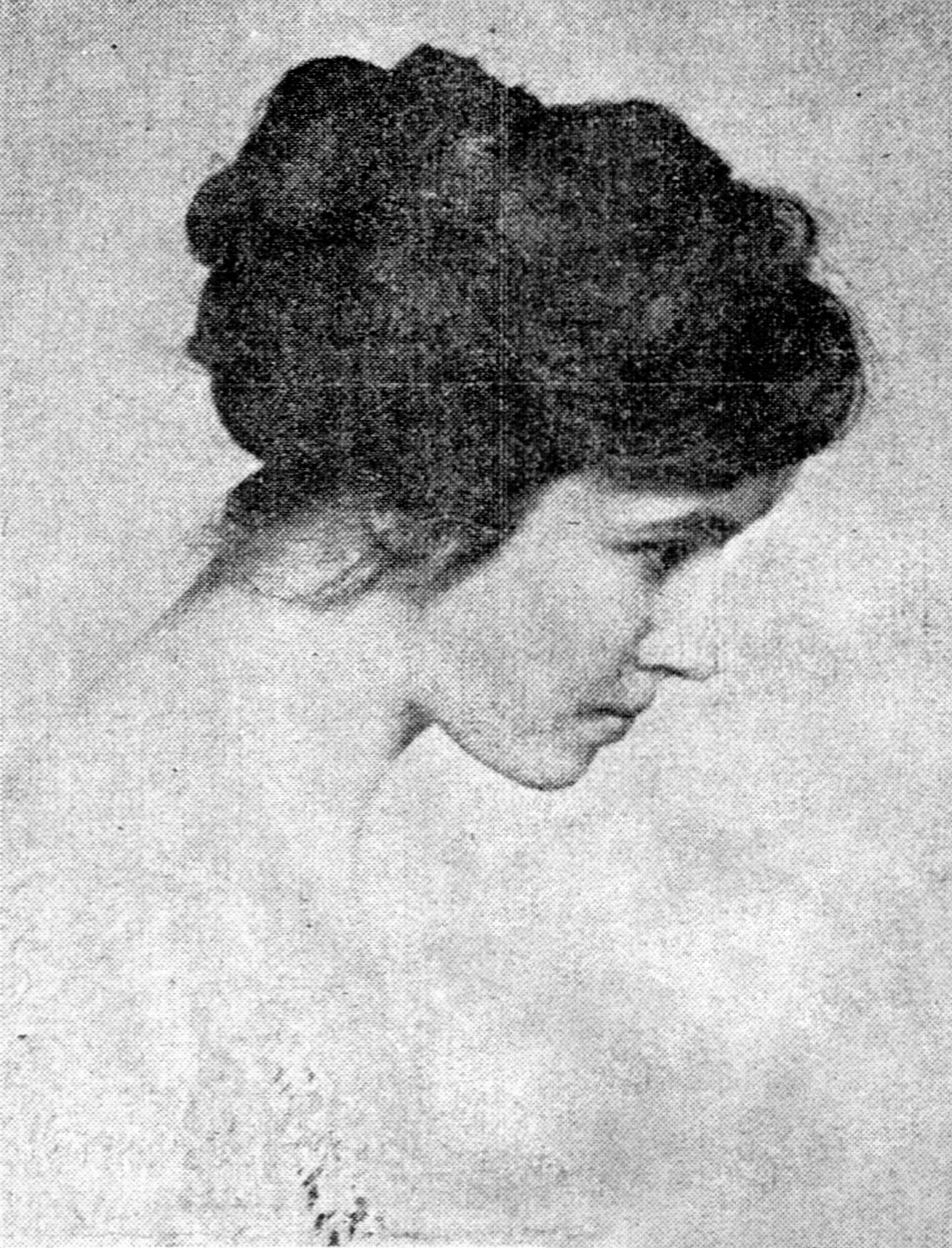
- Cooper c. 1907
- Born: April 8, 1875; Glenwood, Iowa
- Died: March 4, 1937 (aged 62); Chicago, Illinois
- Known for: Sculpture

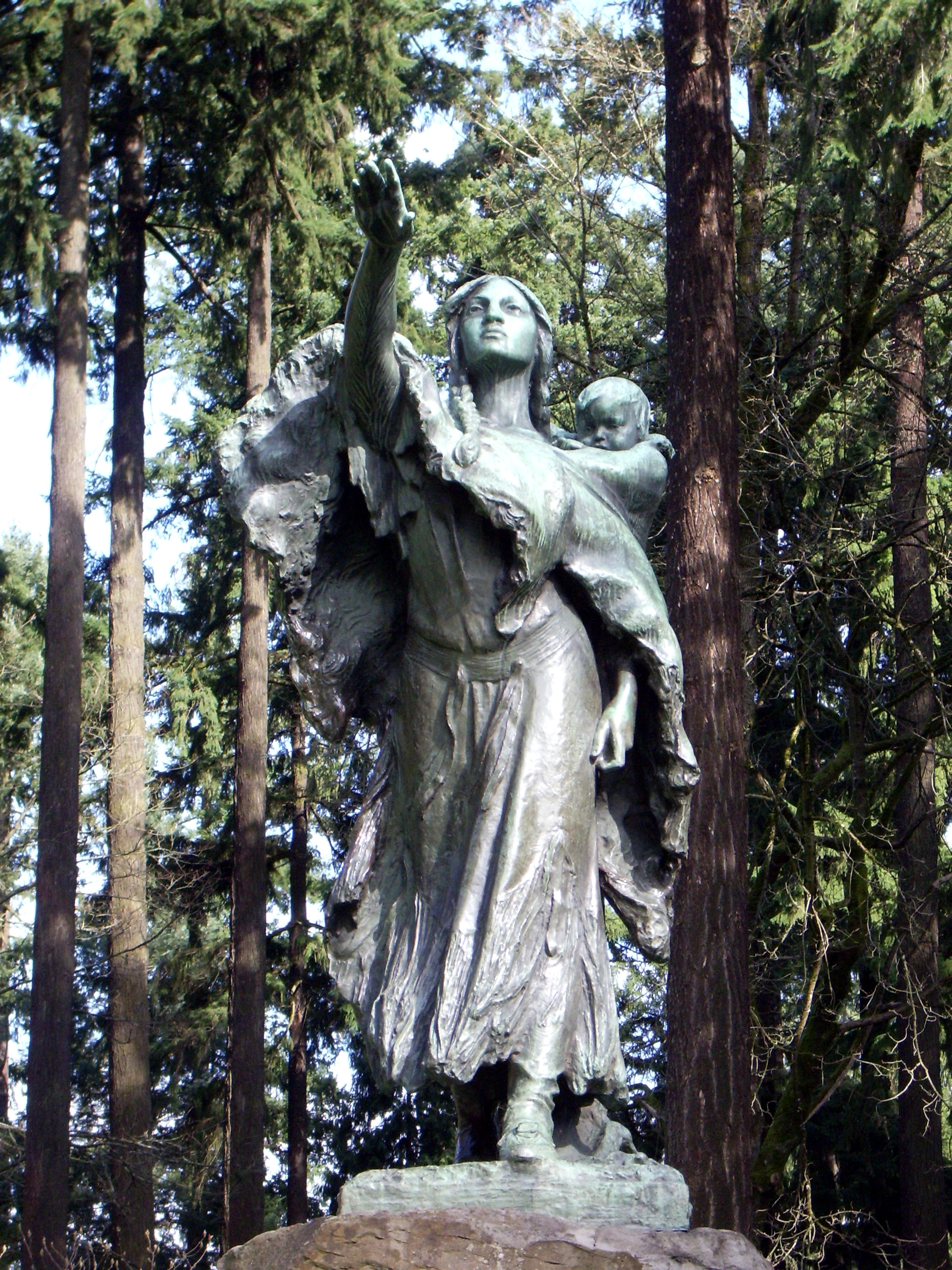
Sacajawea and Jean-Baptiste, in Washington Park

Alice Cooper (April 8, 1875 – March 4, 1937) was an American sculptor.

== Early life and education ==
Cooper was born in Glenwood, Iowa, and was raised in Denver, Colorado.

She studied under Preston Powers (son of the sculptor Hiram Powers) then at the Art Institute of Chicago with Lorado Taft and the Art Students League of New York through about 1901.

== Career ==
Cooper is best known for her bronze figure of Sacajawea (Sacajawea and Jean-Baptiste) originally produced as the centerpiece for the Lewis and Clark Centennial Exposition in Portland, Oregon, 1905, unveiled in a ceremony attended by Susan B. Anthony and other prominent feminists. This figure now stands in Washington Park.

Other work includes:

- Bronze figure of Almeron Eager of Evansville, Wisconsin, 1907
- Work produced for the United States Customs House in San Francisco, California, for architects Eames and Young, circa 1911

She displayed work at her alma mater, Art Institute of Chicago, as well as the Pennsylvania Academy of Fine Arts and the National Academy of Design. Some of her works were sold by Tiffany & Co.

== Personal life ==
Cooper resided in Denver, as well as Illinois and Iowa. In 1907 she married Nathaniel M. Hubbard Jr., son of Iowa judge Nathaniel M. Hubbard, and moved to Des Moines, Iowa. They had three daughters.

She died on March 4, 1937, in Chicago at age 62.
