= Nathaniel M. Hubbard =

American lawyer

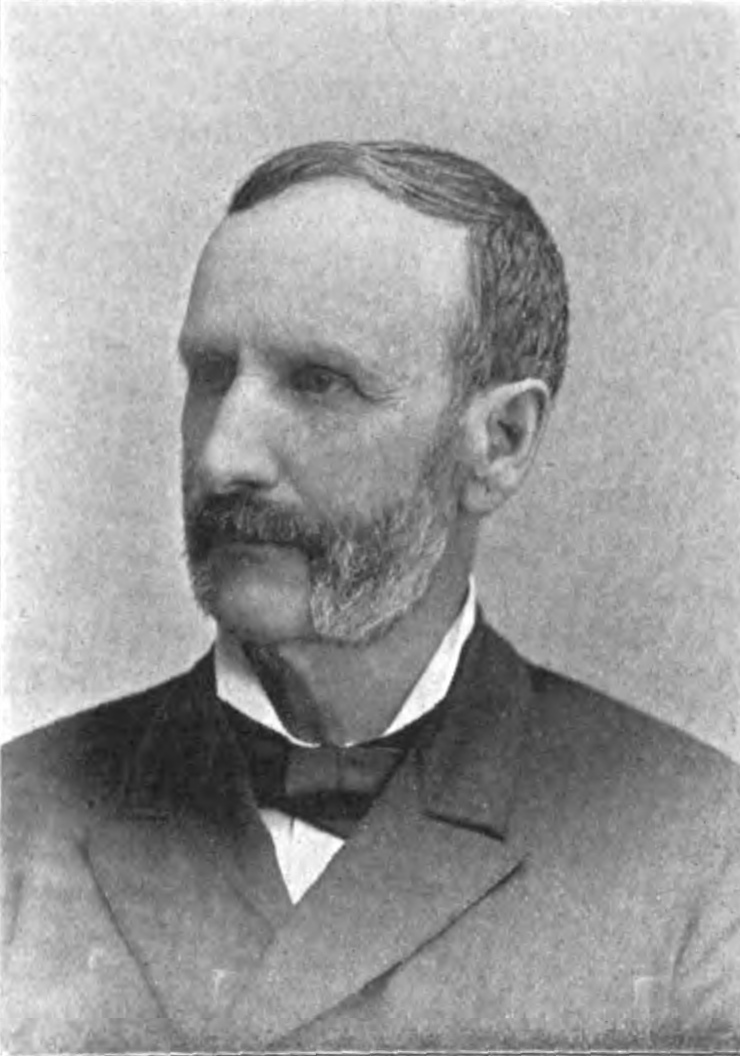
Nathaniel M. Hubbard

Nathaniel Mead Hubbard (1829-1902) was an American lawyer and judge from Iowa.

== Early life ==
Hubbard graduated from Alfred University in 1853 and studied law in Hornellsville, New York. He served as Captain and mustered a company in the Twentieth Iowa Regiment during the Civil War.

== Career ==
He began his practice of law in Marion, Iowa in 1854 after arriving from New York. Hubbard was a trial lawyer known for his sarcasm. His first reported case was on behalf of State of Iowa, for whom he prosecuted an alleged bootlegger in 1857. Later, Hubbard represented the City of Cedar Rapids in its annexation of the City of Kingston which at the time lay on the southwest side of the Cedar River.

Hubbard represented a pioneering land developer, the Iowa Railroad Land Company, which sold land near the railway to the incoming settlers. He represented the Iowa Falls and Sioux City Railroad, a line that would run through Hubbard, Iowa, a town that was named after Hubbard upon its incorporation in 1881. Hubbard served as Iowa Counsel for the Chicago and North Western Railway in a case where a train whistle startled a team of horses causing injury to the buggy occupants. The Supreme Court's opinions in that case (which was twice tried and twice appealed) analyzed the competing interests between the dominant modes of transportation, and were a significant victory for the railroad.

Hubbard died from injuries inflicted by a runaway horse in 1902.
