= Chief Multnomah =

18th-century Willamette leader

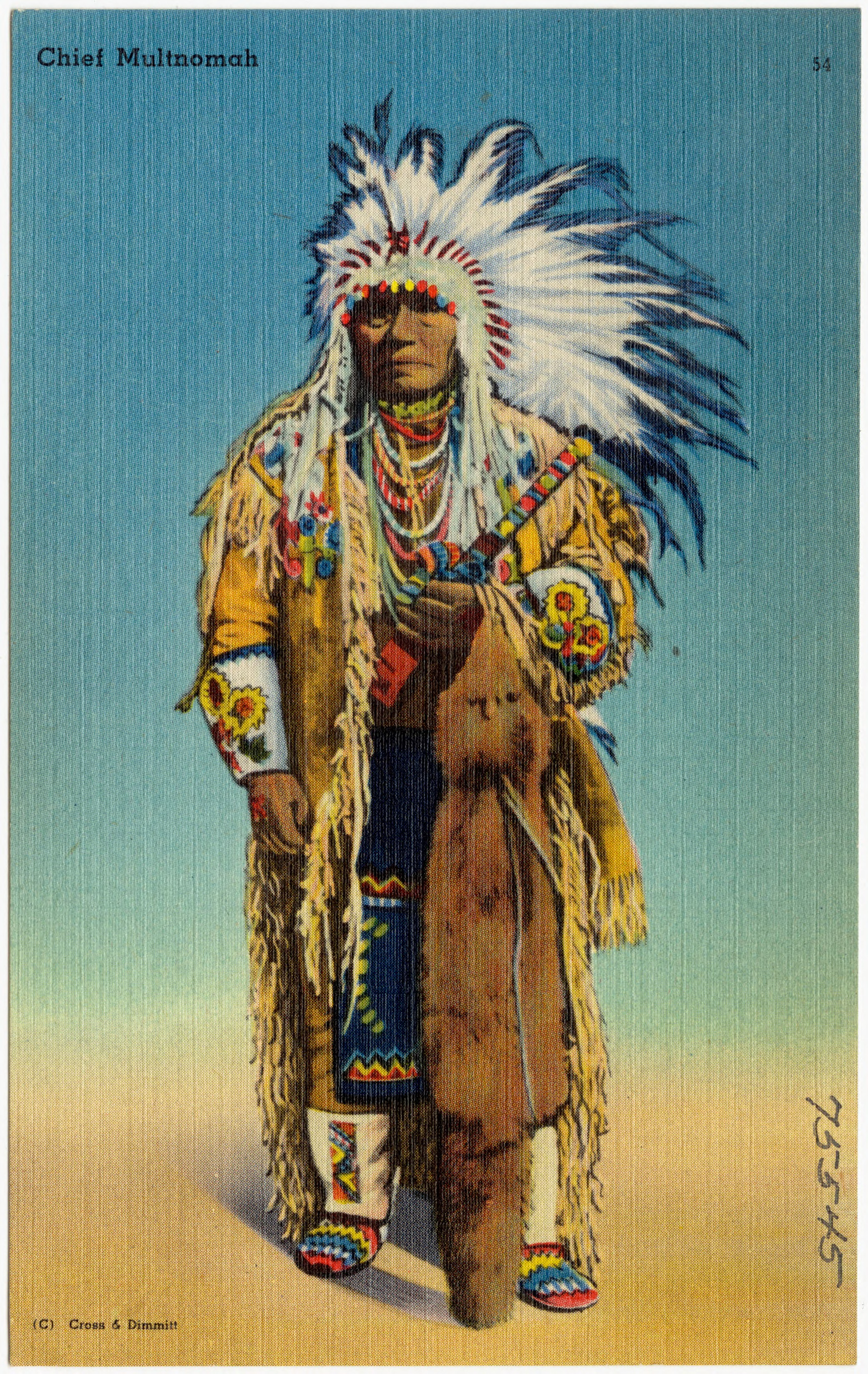
20th century postcard depicting Chief Multnomah

Chief Multnomah is theorized to have been an 18th-century Willamette leader in the Columbia River Valley. Thought to be a fictional or mythic character, some recent study of the work of Ann Fulton suggests he may have been a real individual who held significant power in his prime. He is depicted in Hermon Atkins MacNeil's 1904 sculpture, Coming of the White Man, located in Washington Park in Portland, Oregon. However, it is a generally agreed upon fact that Chief Multnomah was an invention of 19th century writer Frederic Balch in his text titled The Bridge of the Gods: A Romance of Indian Oregon.
