= Sacajawea and Jean-Baptiste =

Statue in Portland, Oregon

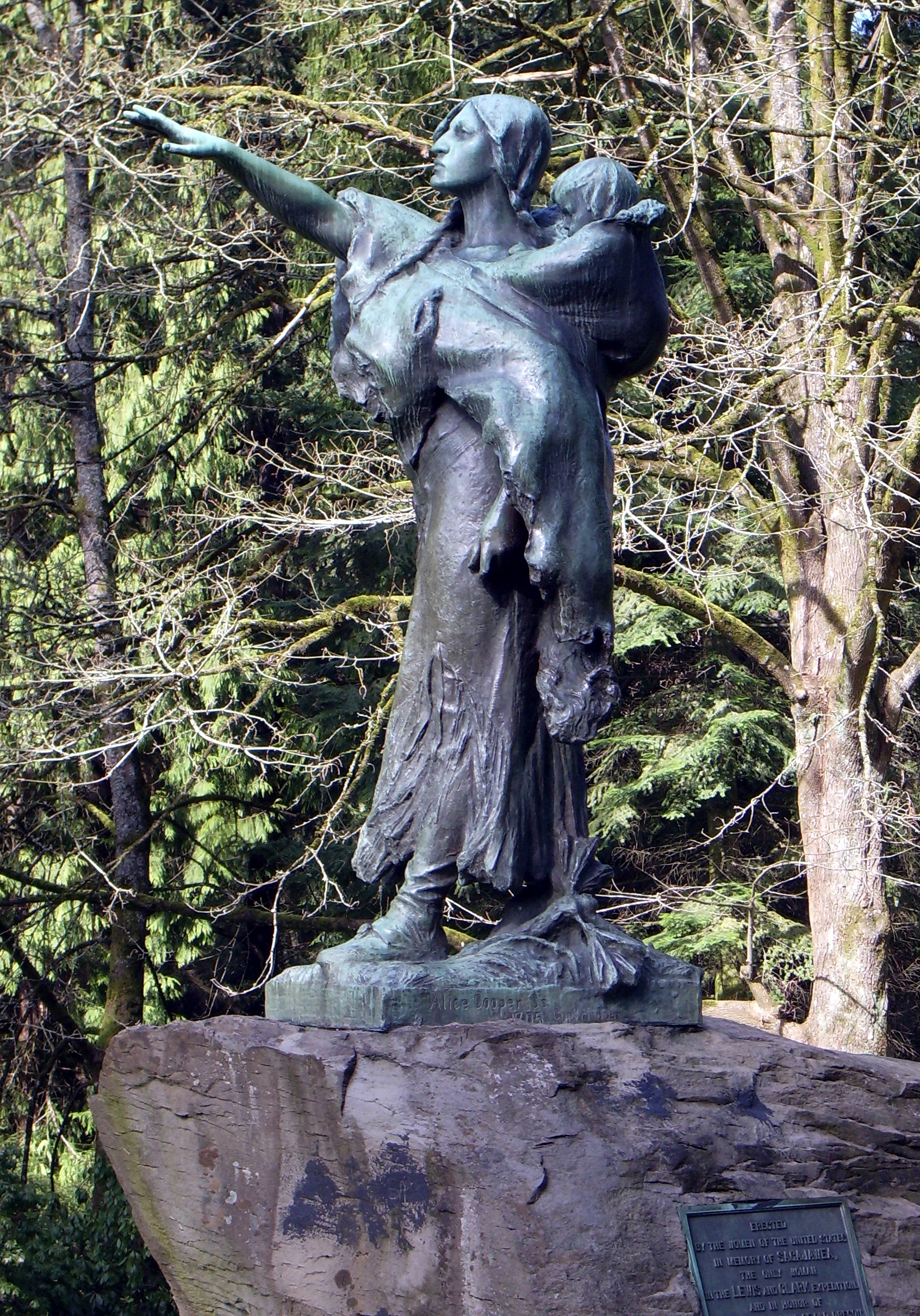
- The sculpture in 2006
- Artist: Alice Cooper
- Year: 1905
- Type: Sculpture
- Medium: Bronze
- Subject: Sacagawea and Jean Baptiste Charbonneau
- Dimensions: 2.1 m × 1.1 m × 0.91 m (7 ft × 3.5 ft × 3 ft)
- Location: Portland, Oregon, United States; 45°31′17″N 122°42′08″W

Sacajawea and Jean-Baptiste is a bronze sculpture of Sacagawea and her infant son Jean Baptiste Charbonneau by American artist Alice Cooper, located in Washington Park in Portland, Oregon, in the United States.

== Description ==
Sacajawea and Jean-Baptiste, designed by Alice Cooper (1875–1937), is an outdoor bronze sculpture, located in Washington Park in Portland, Oregon. It depicts Sacagawea, the Lemhi Shoshone woman who accompanied the Lewis and Clark Expedition during their exploration of the Western United States, with her son Jean Baptiste Charbonneau. The statue measures 7 feet (2.1 m) x 3.5 feet (1.1 m) x 3 feet (0.91 m).

== History ==
The sculpture was commissioned for the Lewis and Clark Centennial Exposition (1905) by the Committee of Portland Women, who requested a sculpture of "the only woman in the Lewis and Clark Expedition and in honor of the pioneer mother of old Oregon." Funding sources included the Port of Portland and Women for Lewis and Clark Exposition, which was supported by women across the Western United States. The sculpture was unveiled on July 6, 1905 and originally stood in the center of the exposition's plaza. Suffragists present at the dedication included Susan B. Anthony, Abigail Scott Duniway and Anna Howard Shaw. The statue was relocated to Washington Park on April 6, 1906, upon the fair's completion. According to the Regional Arts & Culture Council, which administers the sculpture, Cooper was the first female artist to be represented in Portland's public sculpture collection.

== See also ==
- 1905 in art
- Lewis and Clark Exposition dollar
- Lewis and Clark (sculpture), Salem, Oregon
