= Fountains in Portland, Oregon =

Drinking fountains in U.S. state

== Benson Bubblers ==
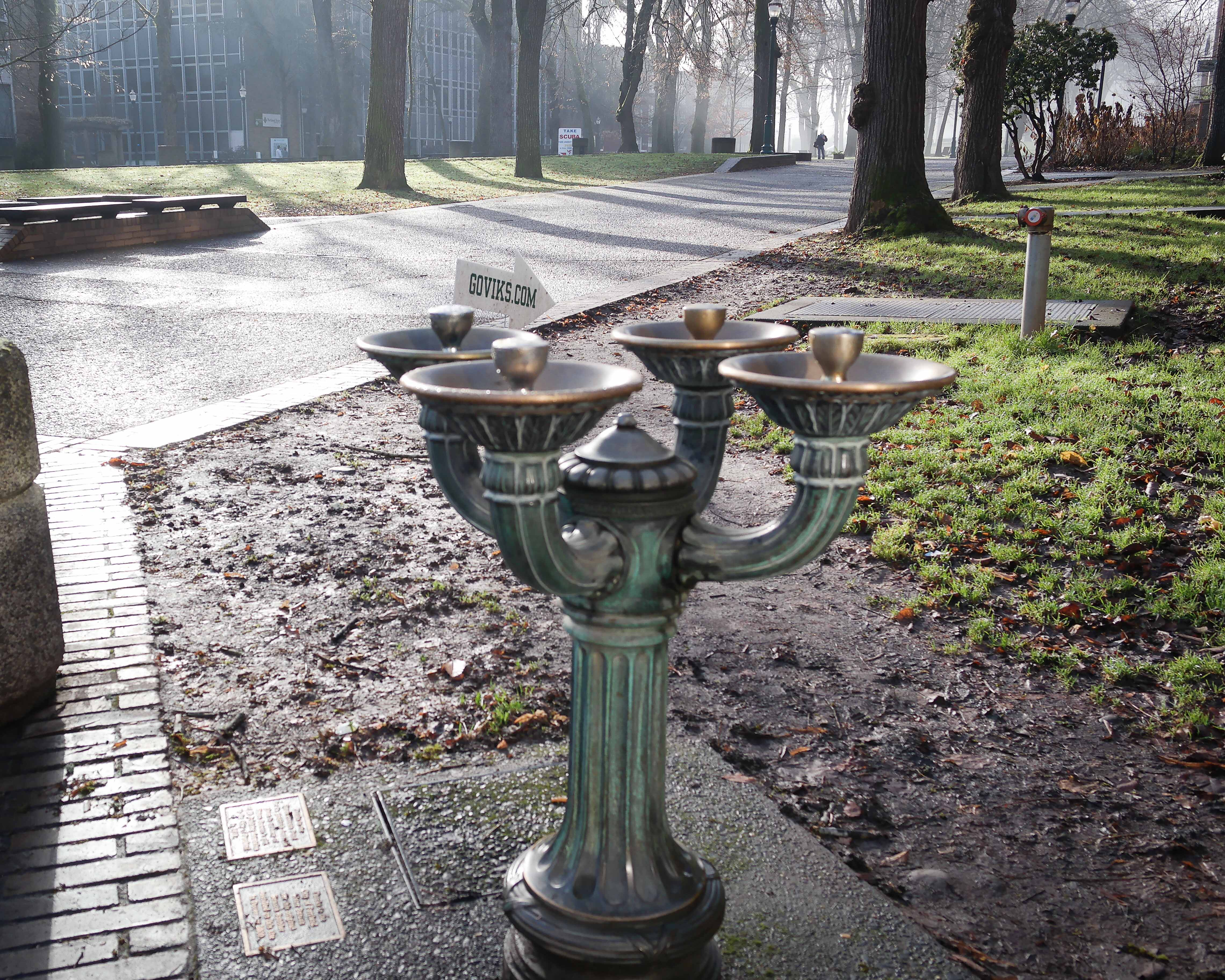
A Benson Bubbler on the campus of Portland State University

More than fifty drinking fountains called Benson Bubblers, named after Simon Benson and designed by A. E. Doyle, are located in and around downtown Portland.

== Portland Parks & Recreation ==
Portland Parks & Recreation maintains fountains throughout the city, including one in North Portland (McCoy Fountain), one in Northeast Portland (Holladay Park Fountain), two in Northwest Portland (Jamison Square Fountain and Horse Trough Fountain), and one in Southeast Portland (The Rose Petal). Fountains in Southwest Portland maintained by the agency include: Animals in Pools, Chiming Fountain, The Dreamer, Keller Fountain, Lovejoy Fountain, Loyal B. Stearns Memorial Fountain, Salmon Street Springs, Shemanski Fountain, Skidmore Fountain, and Thompson Elk Fountain. The Portland Water Bureau has published a two-hour, 2.6-mile self-guided tour featuring twelve fountains in Southwest Portland (with an optional extension to Jamison Square Fountain in Northwest Portland).

Title	Designer(s)	Year	Description	Image
Animals in Pools	Georgia Gerber	1986	Georgia Gerber's Animals in Pools includes ten trough-style fountains. The fountains contain 25 bronze sculptures of animals found in the Pacific Northwest. The pieces were installed in 1986 as part of the Local Improvement District affiliated with TriMet's MAX Light Rail.	Animals in Pools in 2003
Bill Naito Legacy Fountain				The Bill Naito Legacy Fountain in 2012
"The Car Wash" (officially Untitled)	Carter, Hull, Nishita, McCulley and Baxter	1977		"The Car Wash" in 2013.
Chiming Fountain	John "Hans" Staehli	1891		
Chimney Fountain				
The Dreamer	Manuel Izquierdo	1979		
Fountain to a Rose		1973	A bronze fountain in the shape of a rose surrounded by 250 rose bushes and other plants.	
Holladay Park Fountain	Tim Clemen (Murase Associates)	2000		
Horse Trough Fountain				
Jamison Square Fountain				Jamison Square Fountain in 2008
Keller Fountain	Angela Danadjieba (Lawrence Halprin Associates)	1971		Keller Fountain in 1995
Kelly Fountain	Lee Kelly	1977		
Lovejoy Fountain	Lawrence Halprin Associates	1968		Lovejoy Fountain in 2007
Loyal B. Stearns Memorial Fountain	A. E. Doyle & Associates	1941		
McCoy Fountain	Murase Associates	2000		
Pioneer Courthouse Square Waterfall Fountain	Will Martin	1983		Pioneer Courthouse Square Waterfall Fountain in 2009
Pioneer Woman	Frederic Littman	1956	It depicts a standing female figure with her hair flying behind her, holding a baby in her outstretched arms.	
The Rose Petal		1978		
Salmon Street Springs	Robert Perron Landscape Architects	1988		
Shemanski Fountain (Rebecca at the Well)	Carl L. Linde; Oliver Laurence Barrett	1926 (1928)		Shemanski Fountain in 2013
Skidmore Fountain	Olin Levi Warner	1888		Skidmore Fountain in 2015
Teachers Fountain				Teachers Fountain in 2011
Thompson Elk Fountain	Roland Hinton Perry	1900		The Elk in 2006

== Regional Arts & Culture Council ==
The following statues are owned or maintained by the Regional Arts & Culture Council.

Title	Designer(s)	Year	Description	Image
Fountain for Company H (Second Oregon Company Volunteers)	John H. Beaver	1914	Dedicated to the men of Company H of the 2nd Oregon Volunteer Infantry Regiment killed in service during the Spanish–American War. It features a drinking fountain within a clamshell-shaped canopy and measures approximately 89 x 63 x 31 in.	
Frank E. Beach Memorial Fountain	Lee KellyJames Howell	1975	The Frank E. Beach Memorial Fountain is an abstract stainless steel fountain with a path through the middle. It was built to honor Frank E. Beach who christened Portland the "City of Roses" and proposed the Rose Festival.	

== Other ==
Title	Owner	Designer(s)	Year	Description	Image
Charles Frederic Swigert Jr. Memorial Fountain	Metro/Oregon Zoo	Richard Beyer	1983	The figure group, installed at the Oregon Zoo, depicts a man talking to a standing female child and several animals, including an ape, lion, monkey, two wolves and a wolf cub. The man is shown with a monkey behind him and a lion and wolf cub at his feet.	
Essential Forces	Portland Trail Blazers		1995	Two stone pillars. The pillars used to shoot out fire.	
Horse Trough Fountain	Portland Water Bureau				
