= Halprin Open Space Sequence =

Series of urban open spaces and pedestrian zones in Portland, Oregon, U.S.

- U.S. National Register of Historic Places
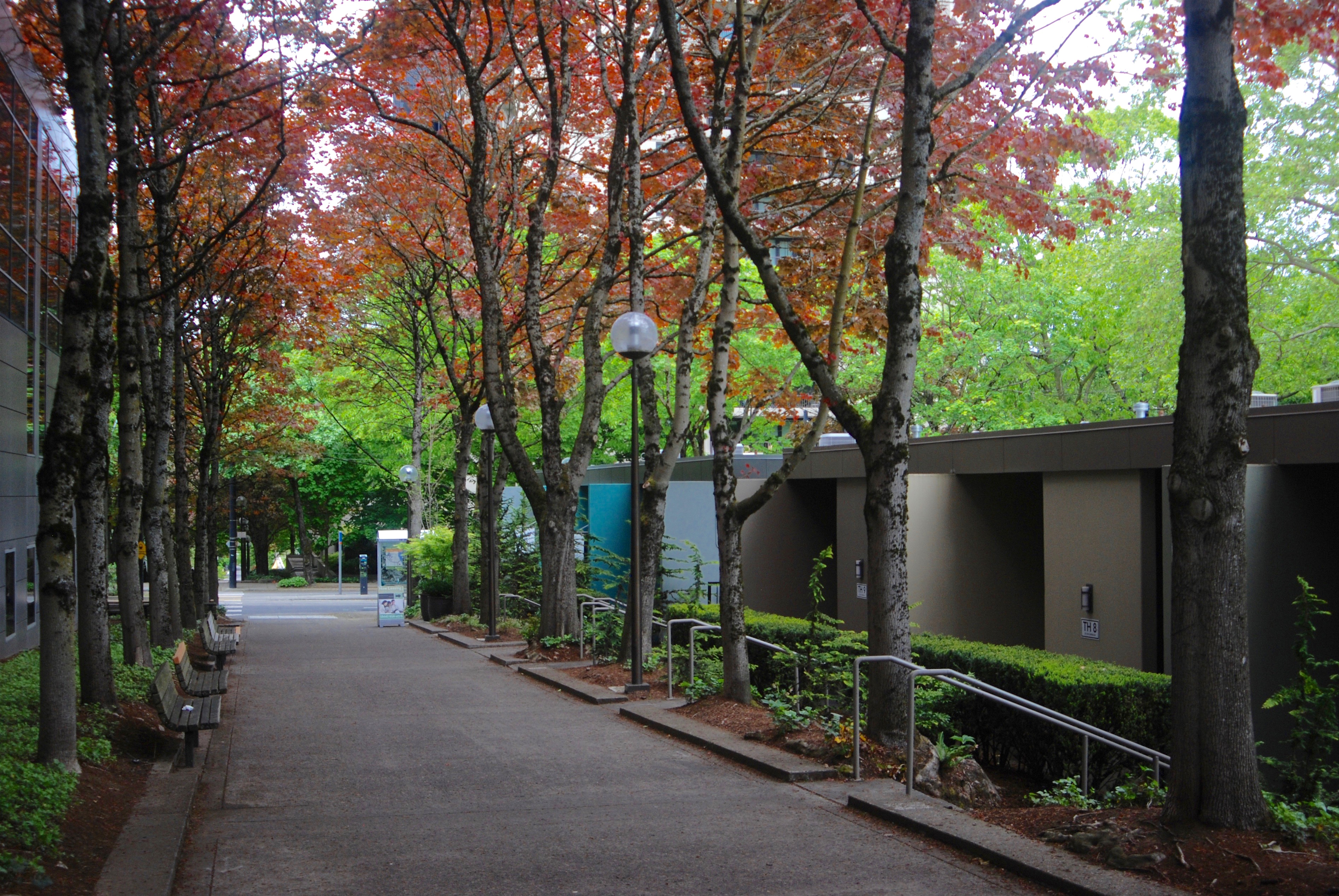
- Looking north on a pedestrian mall on the alignment of 3rd Ave towards Harrison St

- Location within Portland, Oregon
- Location: Open spaces and pedestrian malls from Lincoln Street to Clay Street, downtown Portland, Oregon
- Coordinates: 45°30′39.5″N 122°40′44.2″W
- Area: less than one acre
- Built: 1966–1970
- Architect: Halprin, Lawrence
- Architectural style: Modern Movement
- NRHP reference No.: 130000058
- Added to NRHP: March 6, 2013

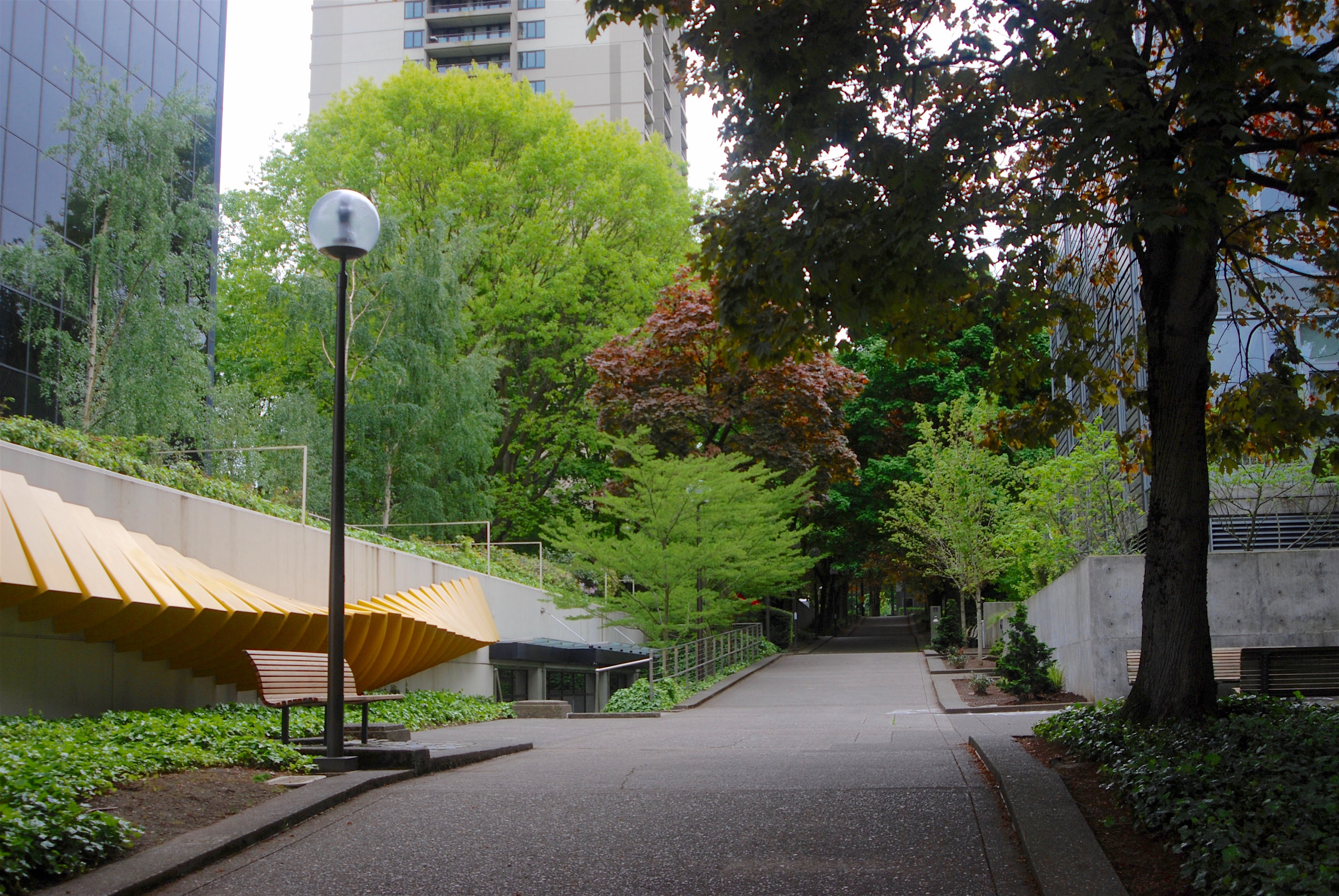
Looking south on a pedestrian mall on the alignment of SW 3rd Avenue at the alignment of Mill Street, 2015

The Halprin Open Space Sequence is a series of urban open spaces and pedestrian zones between Southwest Lincoln Street and Clay Street, in downtown Portland, Oregon, United States. Designed by Lawrence Halprin, the project was completed during 1966–1970, and was added to the National Register of Historic Places on March 6, 2013. It includes Keller Fountain Park, Lovejoy Fountain Park, and Pettygrove Park, along with several other elements.

== See also ==
- National Register of Historic Places listings in Southwest Portland, Oregon
- Pedestrian malls in the United States
