= Satoru Nishita =

Satoru Nishita (July 4, 1927- July 16, 2013) was a landscape architect and a partner in the architectural firm Lawrence Halprin & Associates, based in San Francisco. He was one of Lawrence Halprin's earliest employees, hired in 1951. He became a principal of Halprin's firm in 1964. During the period 1975 - 1977, he and several other employees bought and re-formed Halprin's as Carter Hull Nishita McCulley Baxter & Associates. The company later became Nishita & Carter, Inc. and operated through 1989.

Nishita worked on several of Halprin's projects in the United States and Japan, including the Lovejoy Fountain Park (as partner in charge), Pettygrove Park, and the Ira Keller Fountain, all in Portland, Oregon. He retired from practice for health reasons in the early 1990s.
