= Wallace Park (Portland, Oregon) =

Public park in Portland, Oregon, U.S.

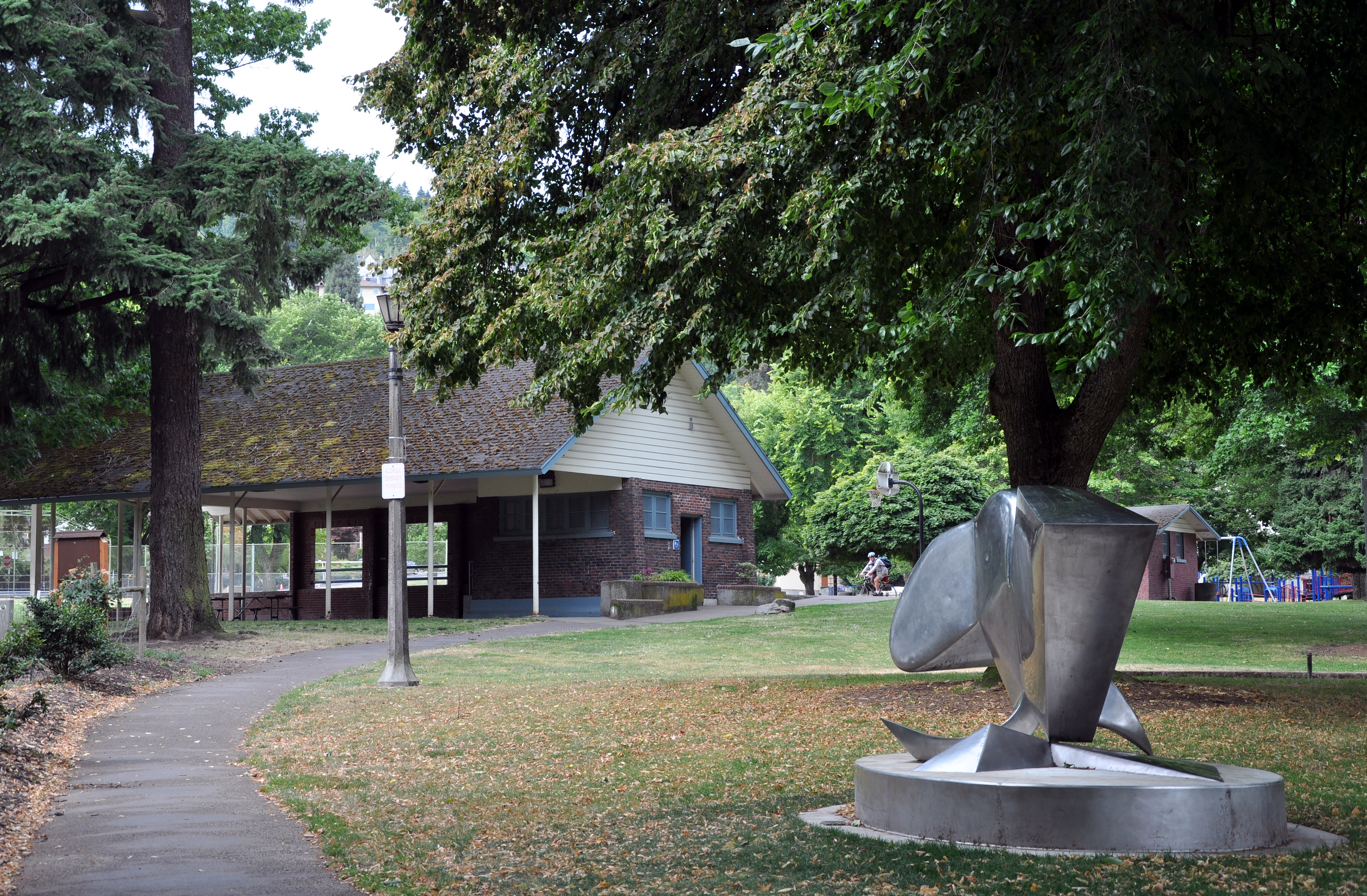
- Wallace Park
- Interactive map of Wallace Park
- Type: Urban park
- Location: NW 25th Ave. and Raleigh St. Portland, Oregon
- Coordinates: 45.53336°N 122.7037°W
- Area: 5.38 acres (2.18 ha)
- Created: 1920
- Operator: Portland Parks & Recreation
- Status: Open 5 a.m. to midnight daily

Wallace Park is a city park in northwest Portland, Oregon, United States.

== Description and history ==
The park was acquired in 1920, and is named after Hugh W. Wallace, the city councilman responsible for getting the property allocated as a city park. One art installation in the park is a 1980 sculpture by Manuel Izquierdo called Silver Dawn. Also located within the park and surrounding school yard exist eleven bronze objects, created by artist Bill Will in 1998, "tucked away in unexpected places".

== History ==
Past events hosted at Wallace Park include the Nob Hill Business Association's festival in 2008, and a celebration for the inaugural Columbia Trail Fest in 2009, a fundraiser to raise money for Forest Park.
