= Pettygrove Park =

Public park in Portland, Oregon, U.S.

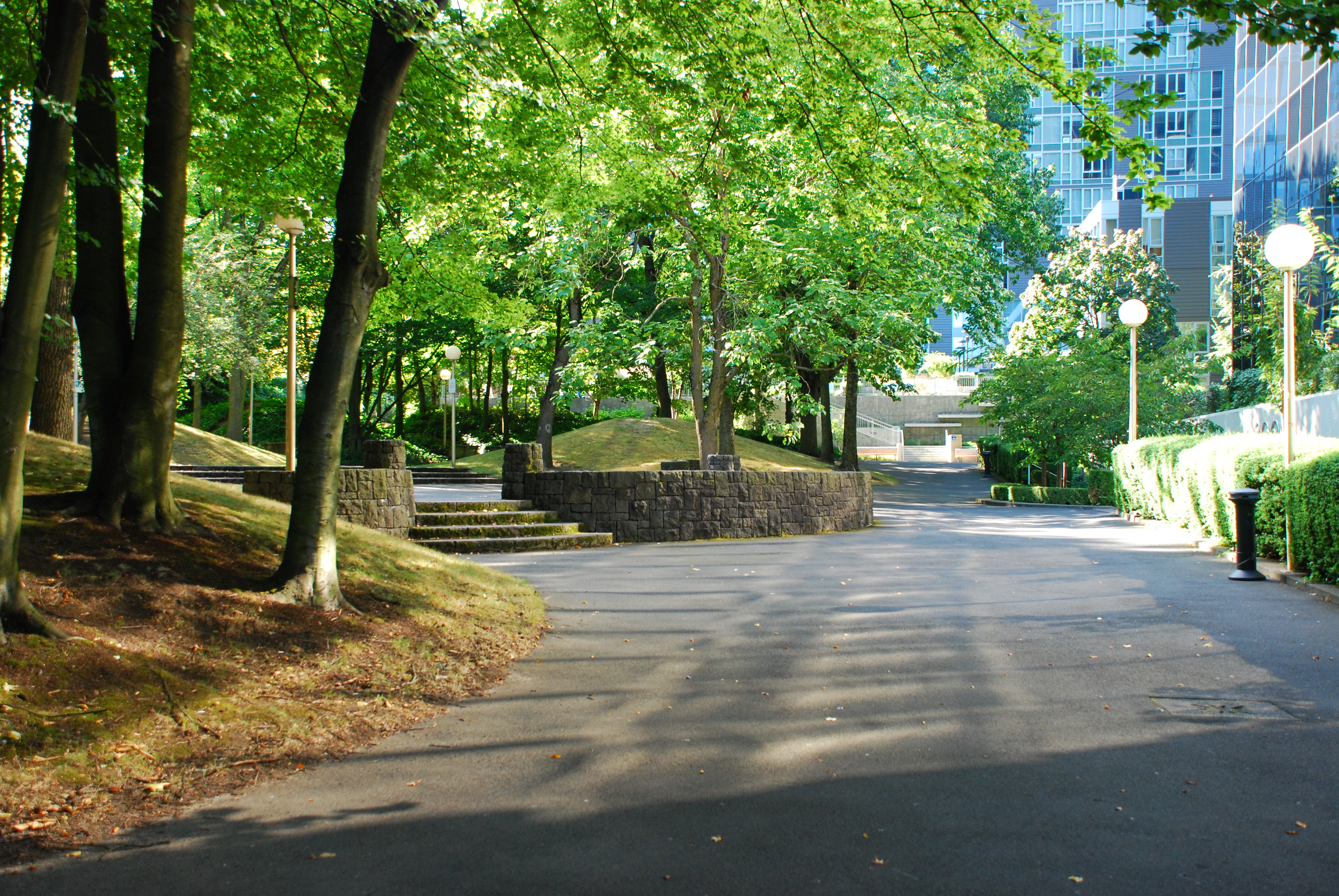
- The park in 2010
- Interactive map of Pettygrove Park
- Type: Urban park
- Location: SW 1st to 4th Ave between Market St. and Harrison St. Portland, Oregon, United States
- Coordinates: 45°30′39″N 122°40′43″W
- Area: 1.17 acres (0.47 ha)
- Created: 1966
- Operator: Portland Parks & Recreation
- Status: Open 5 a.m. to midnight daily
- Public transit: NSAB 35, 40, 54
- Website: www.portland.gov/parks/pettygrove-park

Pettygrove Park is a city park in downtown Portland, Oregon, United States. It is the second park in a series of urban open spaces designed by American landscape architect Lawrence Halprin in the South Auditorium District urban renewal area. The soft mounds of landscaping are responsible for the park's nickname of 'Mae West Park'.

== Description and history ==
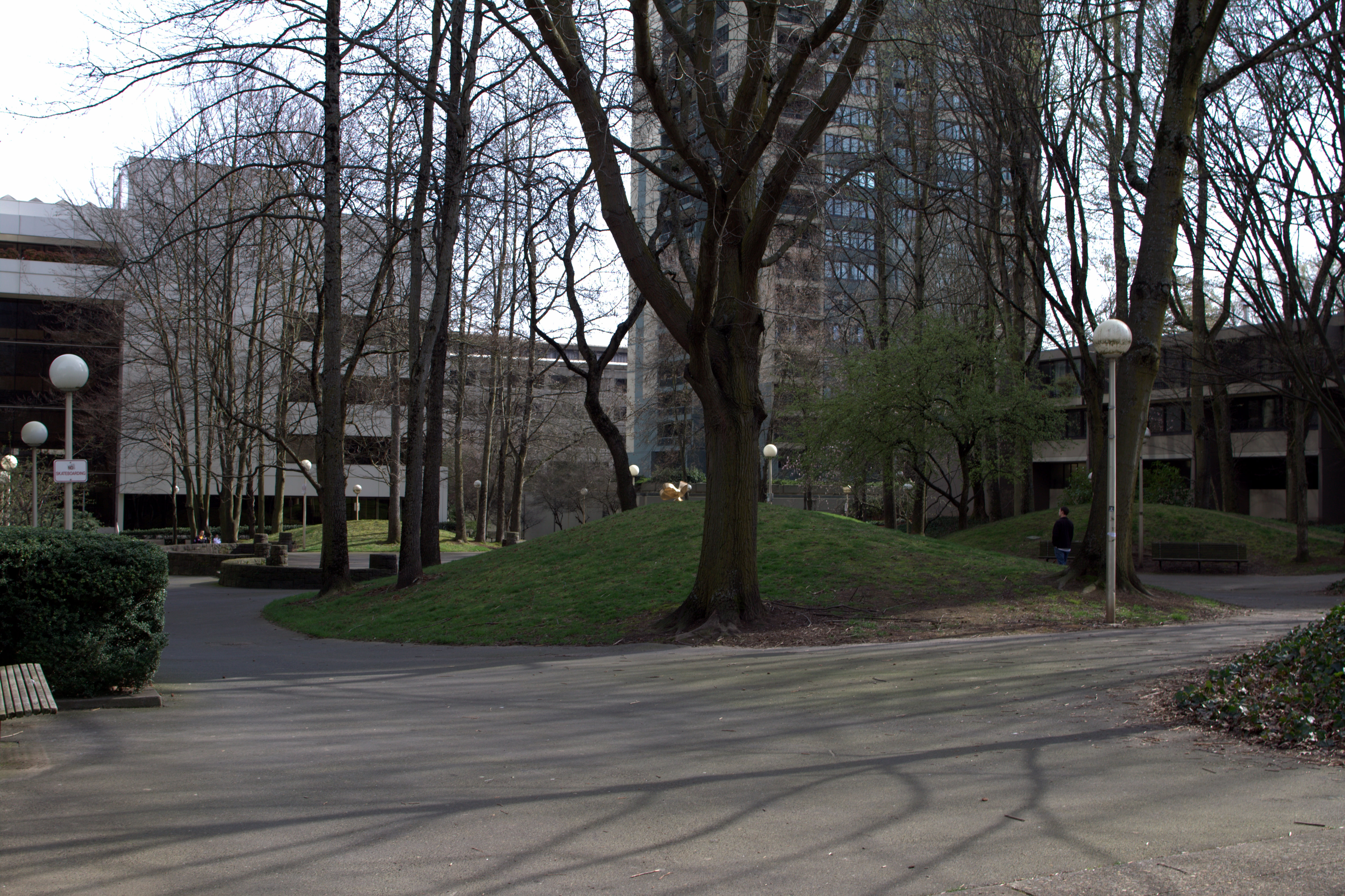
A winter view of the park

Pettygrove Park is bounded on all sides by pedestrian malls, which connect to other parks, including Keller Fountain Park and Lovejoy Plaza. The park is characterized by a dense tree canopy which shades a core of internal asphalt pathways pivoting along grassy berms and basalt stone walls. At the southeast corner of the park, a reflecting pool and sculpture serve as a focal point for pedestrians. The sculpture, called The Dreamer, was designed by Manuel Izquierdo and commissioned by the Portland Development Commission in 1979.

The park was named for Francis Pettygrove, one of the early settlers of the Portland townsite. The same coin used by Pettygrove and settler Asa Lovejoy to determine whether the city would be named Portland or Boston was flipped to determine which park in the open-space sequence would be Lovejoy and which would be Pettygrove.

== See also ==
- List of parks in Portland, Oregon
