= Freeway Park =

Urban park in Seattle, Washington, US

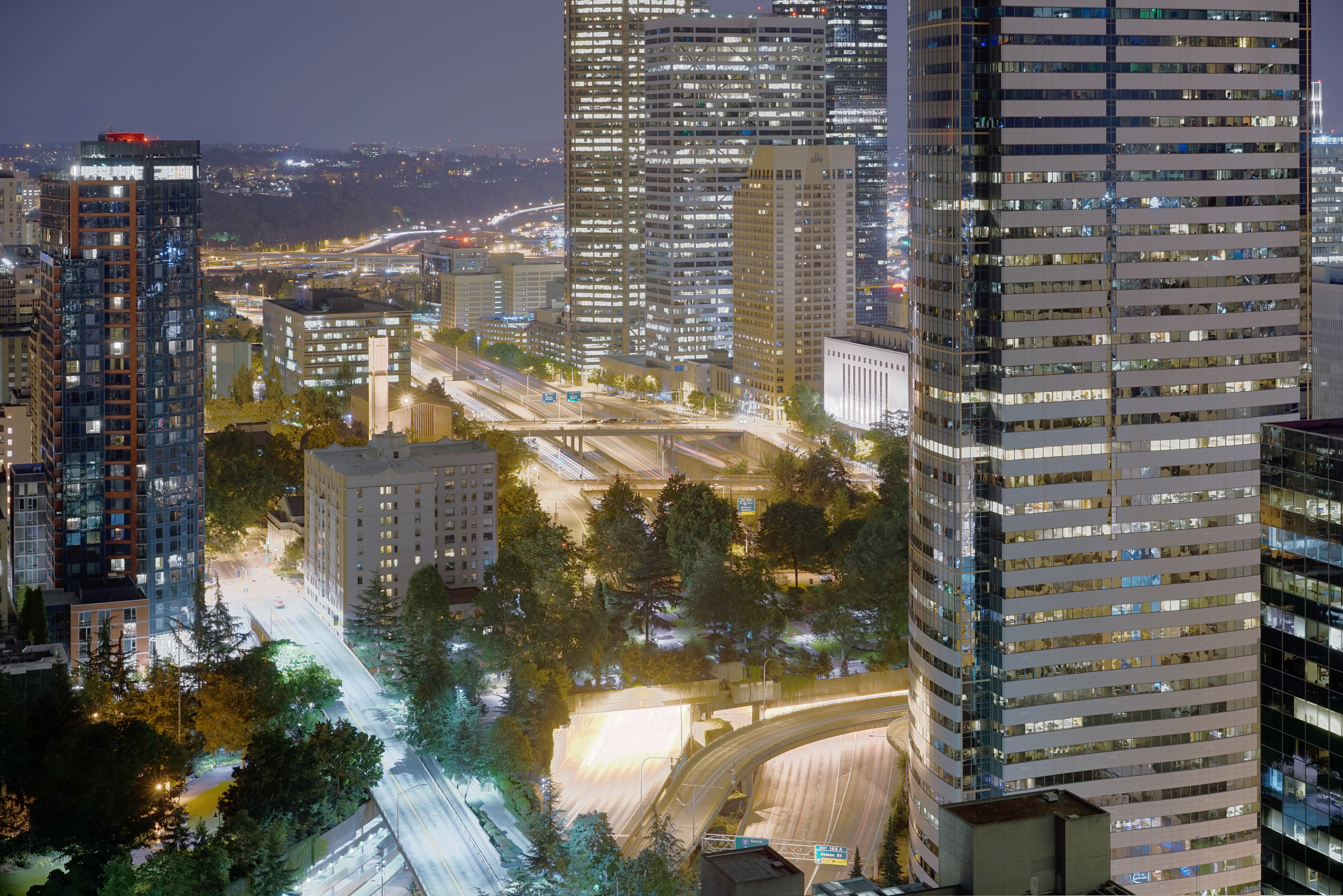
- Aerial view of Freeway Park at night
- Interactive map of Freeway Park
- Type: Urban park
- Location: 700 Seneca Street, Seattle, Washington, United States
- Coordinates: 47°36′35″N 122°19′52″W
- Area: 5.2 acres (2.1 ha; 0.0081 mi^{2}; 0.021 km^{2})
- Opened: July 4, 1976; 50 years ago
- Owner: Seattle Parks and Recreation
- Operator: Freeway Park Association
- Open: 6:00 a.m. to 10:00 p.m.
- Public transit: Symphony station
- Freeway Park
- U.S. National Register of Historic Places
- Washington Heritage Register
- Seattle Landmark
- Architect: Lawrence Halprin, Angela Danadjieva
- Architectural style: Brutalism
- NRHP reference No.: 100004789

Significant dates
- Added to NRHP: December 19, 2019
- Designated WHR: October 25, 2019
- Designated SEATL: May 18, 2022

Freeway Park, officially known as Jim Ellis Freeway Park, is an urban park in Seattle, Washington, United States, connecting the city's downtown to the Seattle Convention Center and First Hill. The park sits atop a section of Interstate 5 and a large city-owned parking lot; 8th Avenue also bridges over the park. An unusual mixture of brutalist architecture and greenery, the 5.2-acre (21,000 m^{2}) park, designed by Lawrence Halprin's office under the supervision of Angela Danadjieva, opened to the public on July 4, 1976, at a cost of $23.5 million. An expansion of the park that stretches several blocks up First Hill, including a stairway and wheelchair ramp, was opened in 1982.

The park is also a cultural landscape and a precedent setting park that, according to The Cultural Landscape Foundation, helped define a new land-use typology for American cities. It was listed on the National Register of Historic Places on December 19, 2019, having been listed on the Washington Heritage Register in a unanimous vote on October 25; it was also declared a Seattle Landmark by the city's landmarks preservation board in a unanimous vote on May 18, 2022.

The park's unique architecture has made it famous among parkour enthusiasts. The World Freerunning and Parkour Federation listed Freeway Park second on its list of the seven best parkour locations in the world.

== History ==
A series of crimes, in particular a murder on January 18, 2002, briefly gave the park a reputation as a haven for crime and led to calls for a radical redesign. Many at first attributed the dangers to the design of the park. A neighborhood group formed under the name Freeway Park Neighborhood Association (FPNA) collaborated with the city's parks and recreation department to produce an "activation plan" for the park, published in 2005 as "A New Vision for Freeway Park". The report has concluded that the park's problems could be remedied by numerous small changes: increased security patrols, better lighting, pruning back of certain plants, and above all increased use, both in terms of organized events and simply encouraging more convention center visitors to use the park. The strategy, only partly implemented as of summer 2005, seems to be succeeding: according to David Brewster of the FPNA, crime in the park is down 90% compared to that of 2002. The park was renovated in 2008 and renamed to honor civic leader Jim Ellis.

== Gallery ==
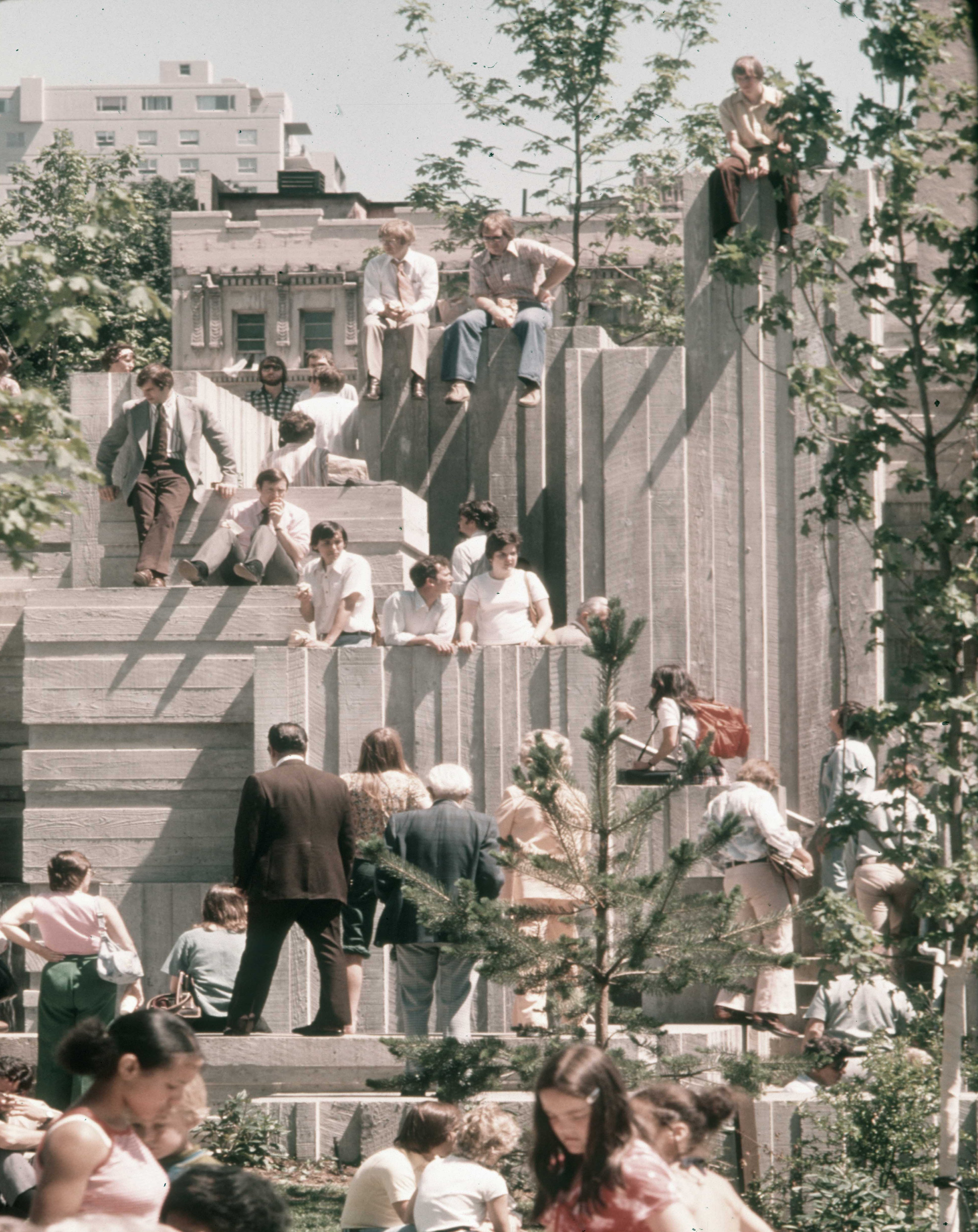
Brutalist fountain, Freeway Park, circa 1970s.

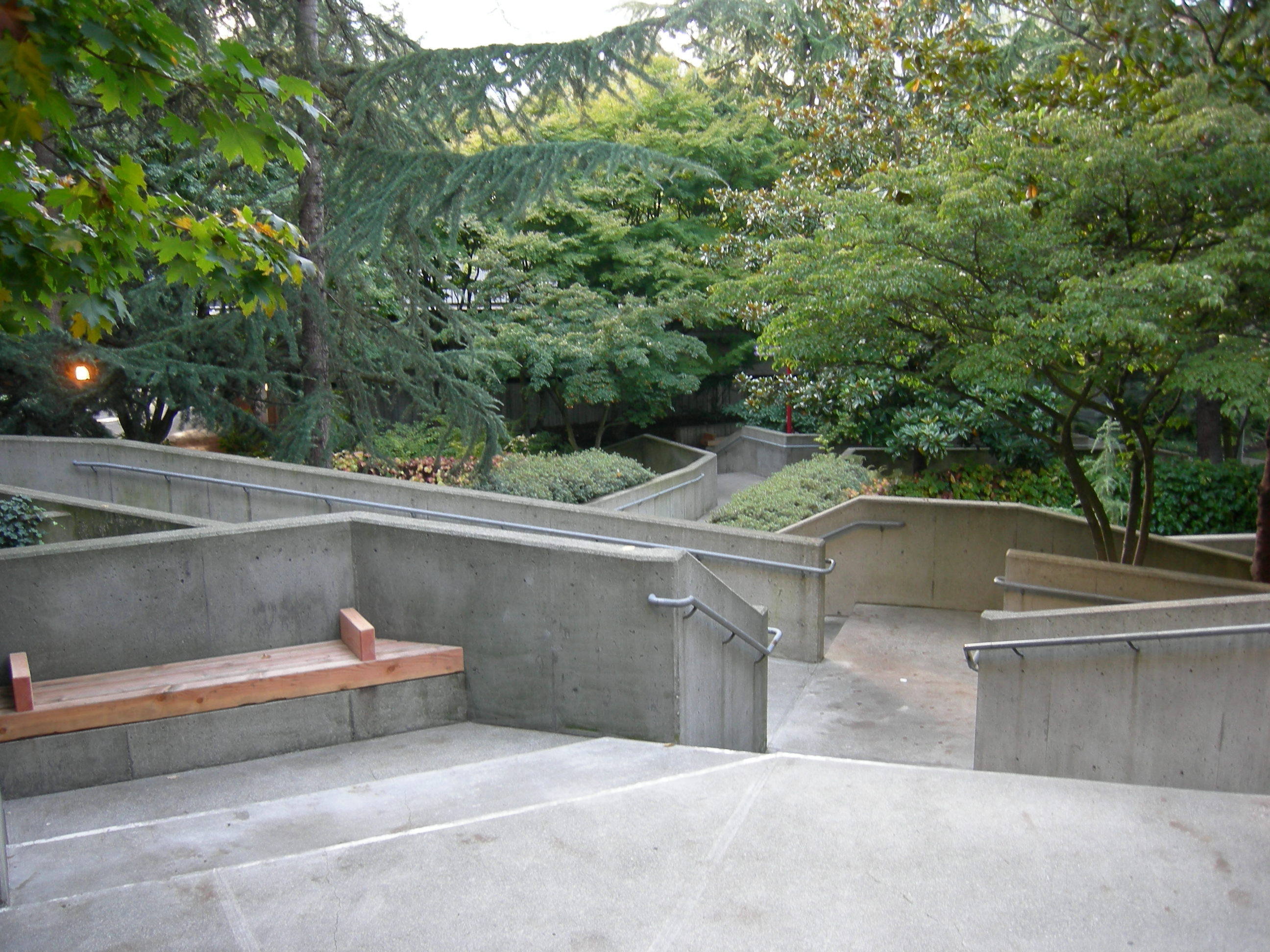
The park winds its way down First Hill, offering both a staircase and wheelchair-accessible ramps.

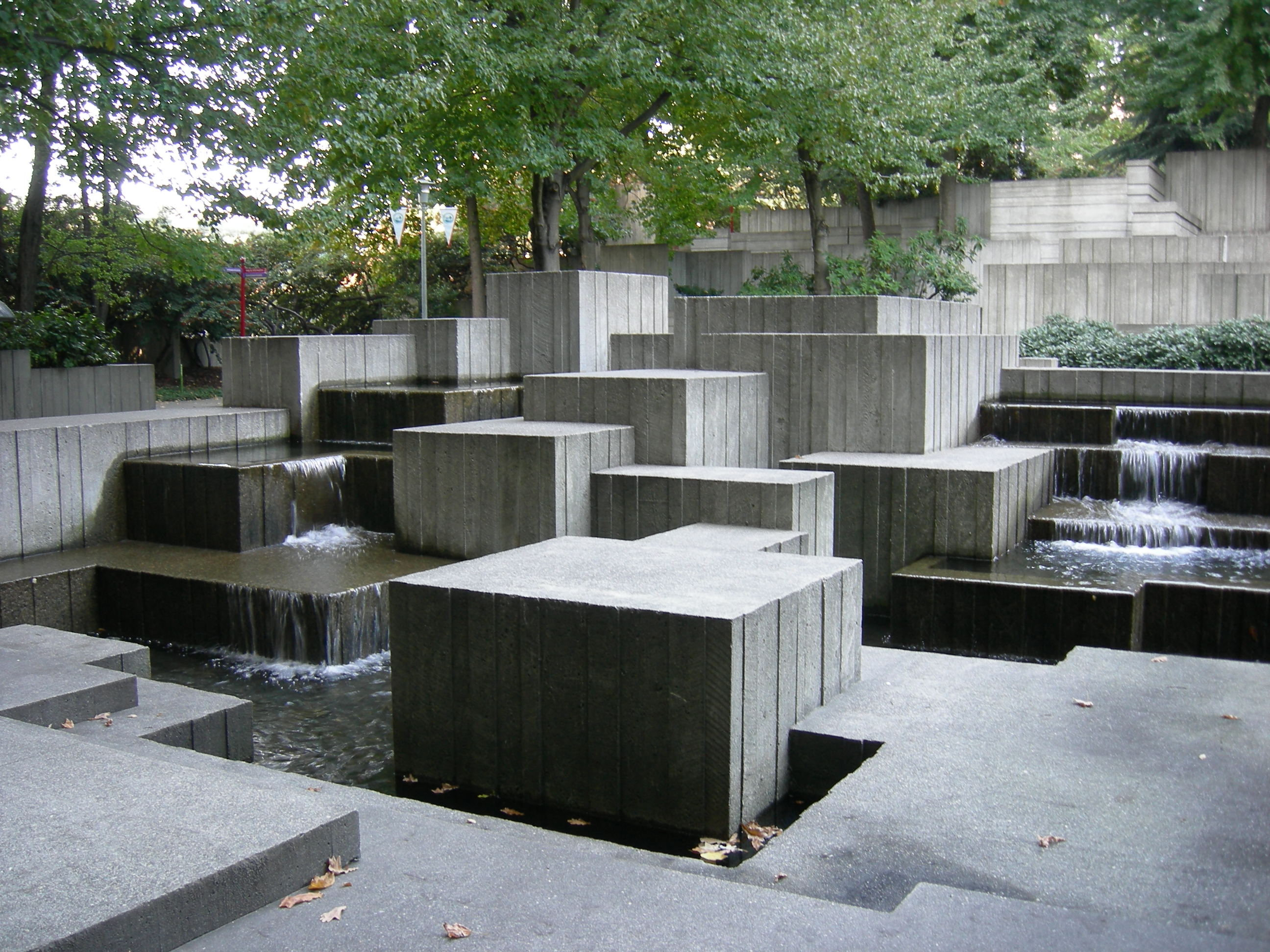
Brutalist fountain, Freeway Park.

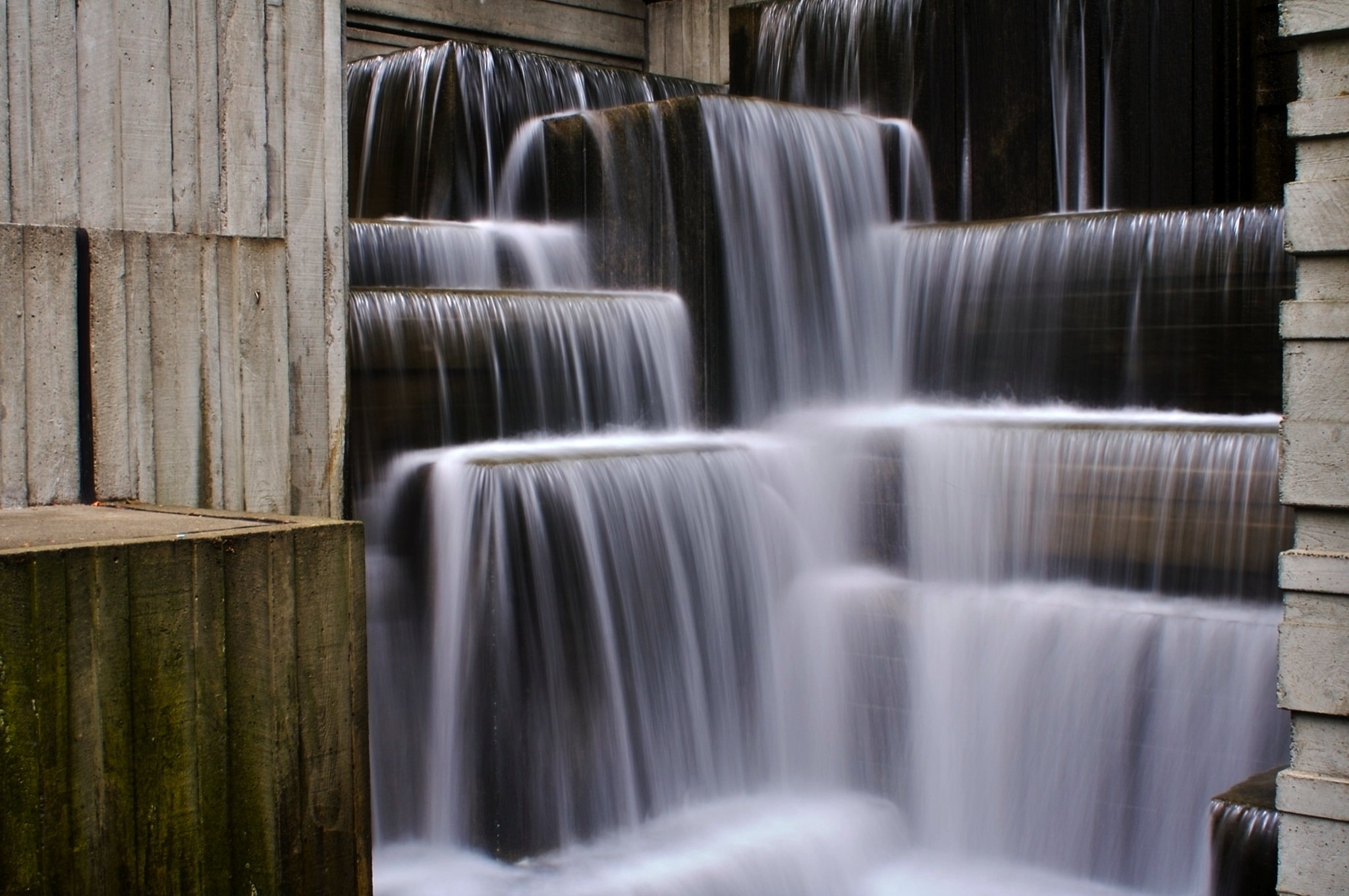

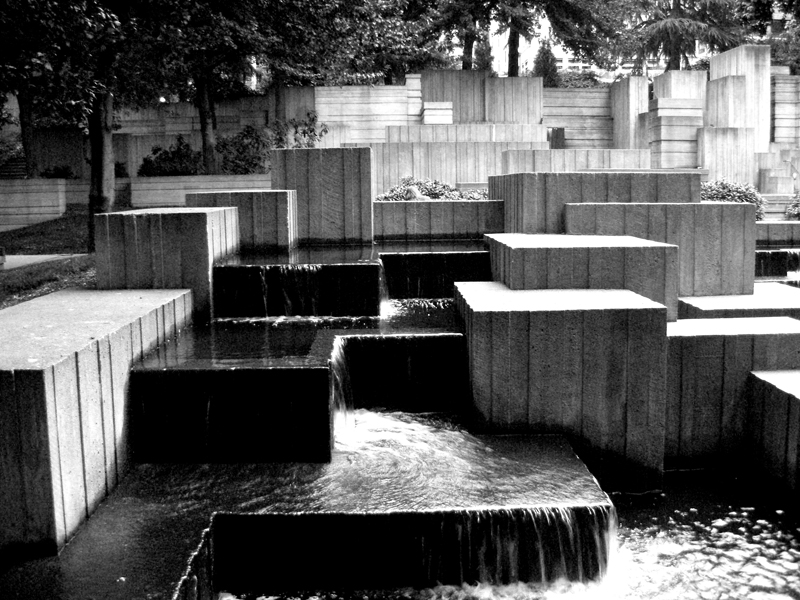

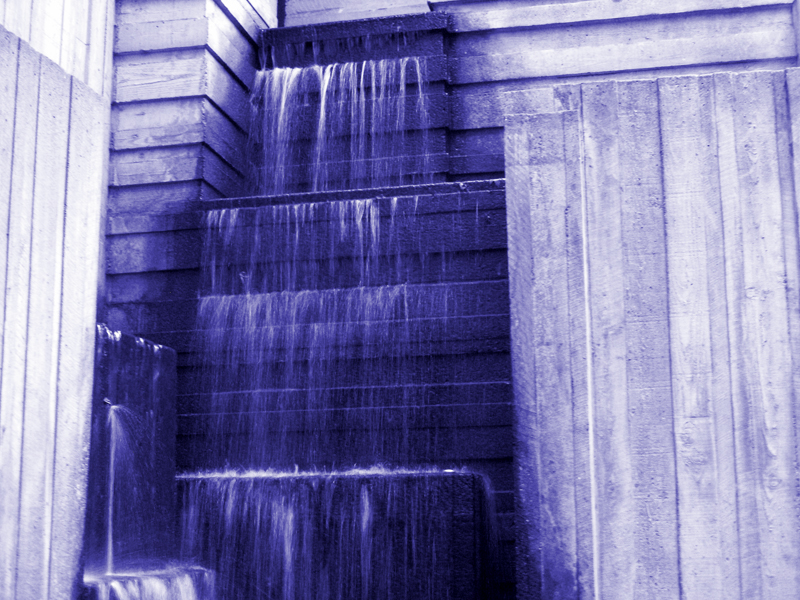

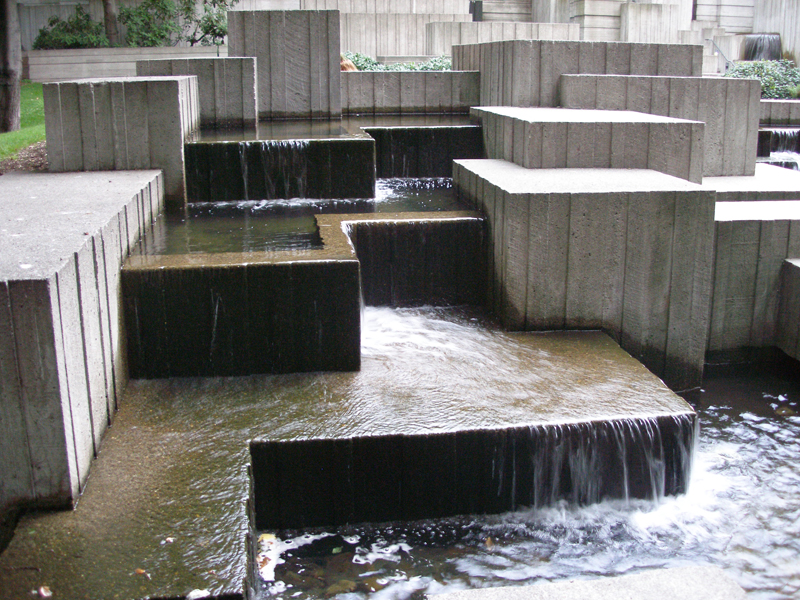

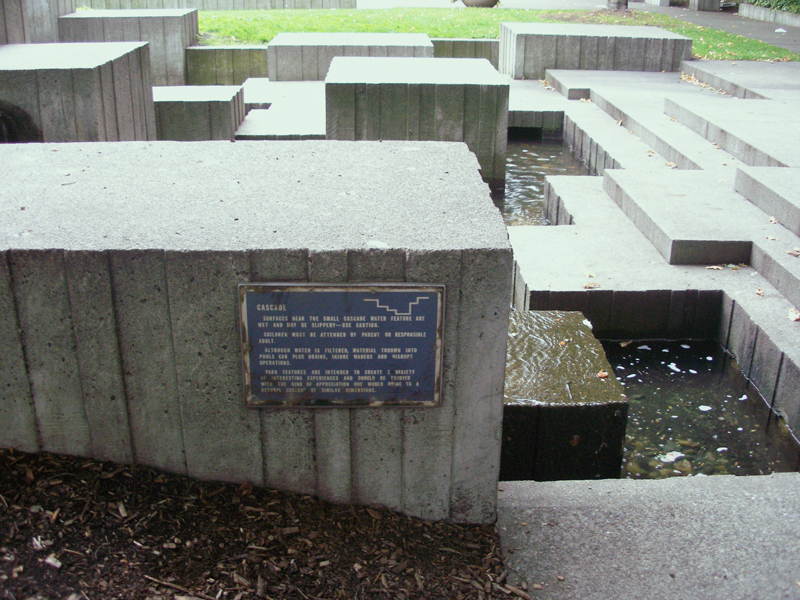
