= Angela Danadjieva =

American landscape architect

Angela Danadjieva is a landscape architect who founded the multidisciplinary design firm Danadjieva & Koenig Associates with her partner Thomas Koenig. She is well known for her work with Lawrence Halprin & Associates, including the Ira Keller Fountain in Portland, Oregon and Freeway Park in Seattle, Washington.

== Early life and education ==
Danadjieva was born in 1931 in Sofia, Bulgaria. She graduated from Bulgaria's State University in Sofia in 1960 with a degree in architecture. She worked as a set designer and art director for the Bulgarian film industry for 7 years. Danadjieva won the Golden Rose Award (the equivalent to an Oscar award in Bulgaria) for her work on the movie The Captured Squadron.

In 1963, Danadjieva and her partner Ivan Tzvetin entered an international design competition in Cuba, and placed second for their design of a plaza, museum, and monument. After this, Danadjieva became increasingly interested in architecture, and went to study at the École des Beaux Arts in Paris from 1964 to 1966. While there, Danadjieva worked for the architectural firm Denieul-Marty-Paoli.

== Career in the United States ==
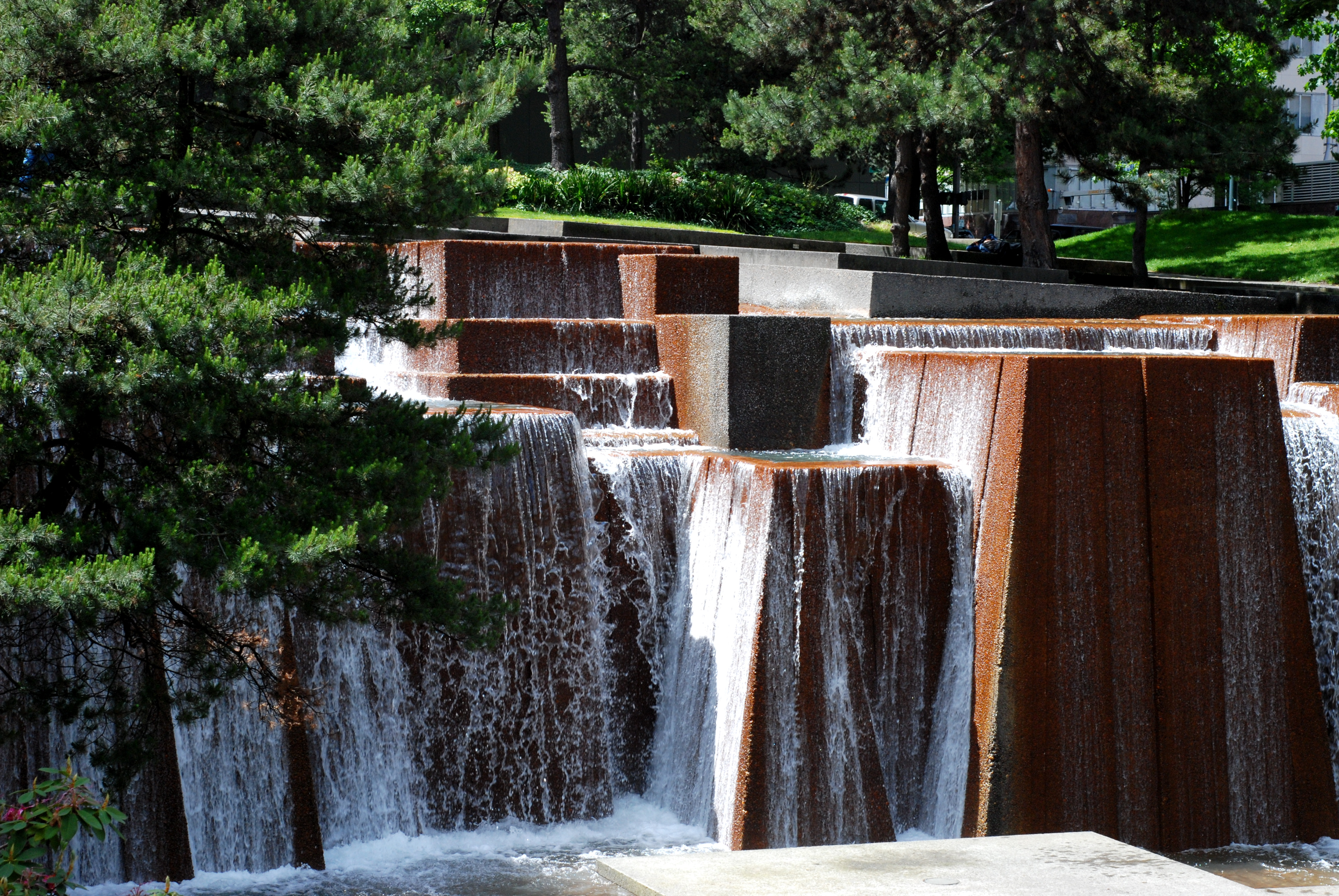
Keller Fountain Park in Portland, Oregon

In 1965, while Danadjieva was at the École des Beaux-Arts, she and Ivan Tzvetin won first prize in an international design competition for the San Francisco Civic Center Plaza. While the project was never built, this brought Danadjieva to the United States. She met Lawrence Halprin soon after, and joined his firm Halprin and Associates as a project designer. There, from 1967 to 1976, she led more than twenty urban design and city-planning projects with the firm, including the Washington State Capitol in Olympia, the Jewish Home of San Francisco, and the Virginia Museum of Fine Arts in Richmond. Notably, she was lead designer on the Ira Keller Fountain Park in Portland, Oregon, and Freeway Park in Seattle, Washington.

After leaving Halprin and Associates in 1976, Danadjieva founded Danadjieva & Koenig Associates with architect Thomas Koenig. Their major projects include the White River State Park in Indianapolis, Indiana, a planning study for James River Park System in Richmond, Virginia, and an extension to Seattle's Freeway Park to include the Washington State Convention and Trade Center.

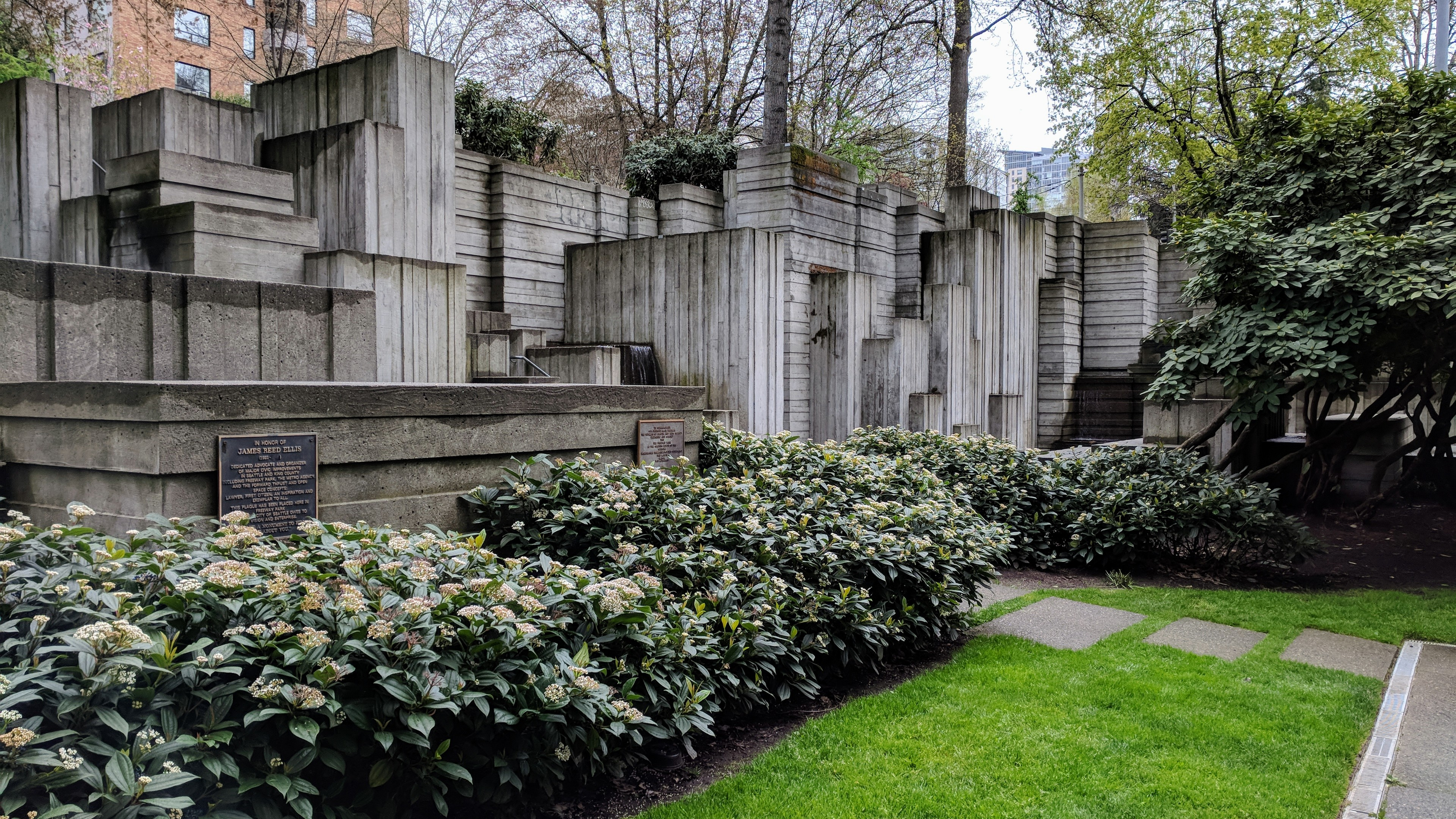
Freeway Park in Seattle, Washington

Danadjieva maintains her practice with Koenig today in Tiburon, California.

=== Major works ===
- Ira Keller Fountain Park – Portland, Oregon
- Freeway Park – Seattle, Washington
- Thomas Polk Park - Charlotte, North Carolina
- Washington State Capitol – Olympia, Washington
- Jewish Home of San Francisco – San Francisco, California
- Virginia Museum of Fine Arts – Richmond, Virginia
- White River State Park – Indianapolis, Indiana
- James River Park System – Richmond, Virginia
- Freeway Park Extension – Seattle, Washington
