= Silver Dawn =

Sculpture in Portland, Oregon

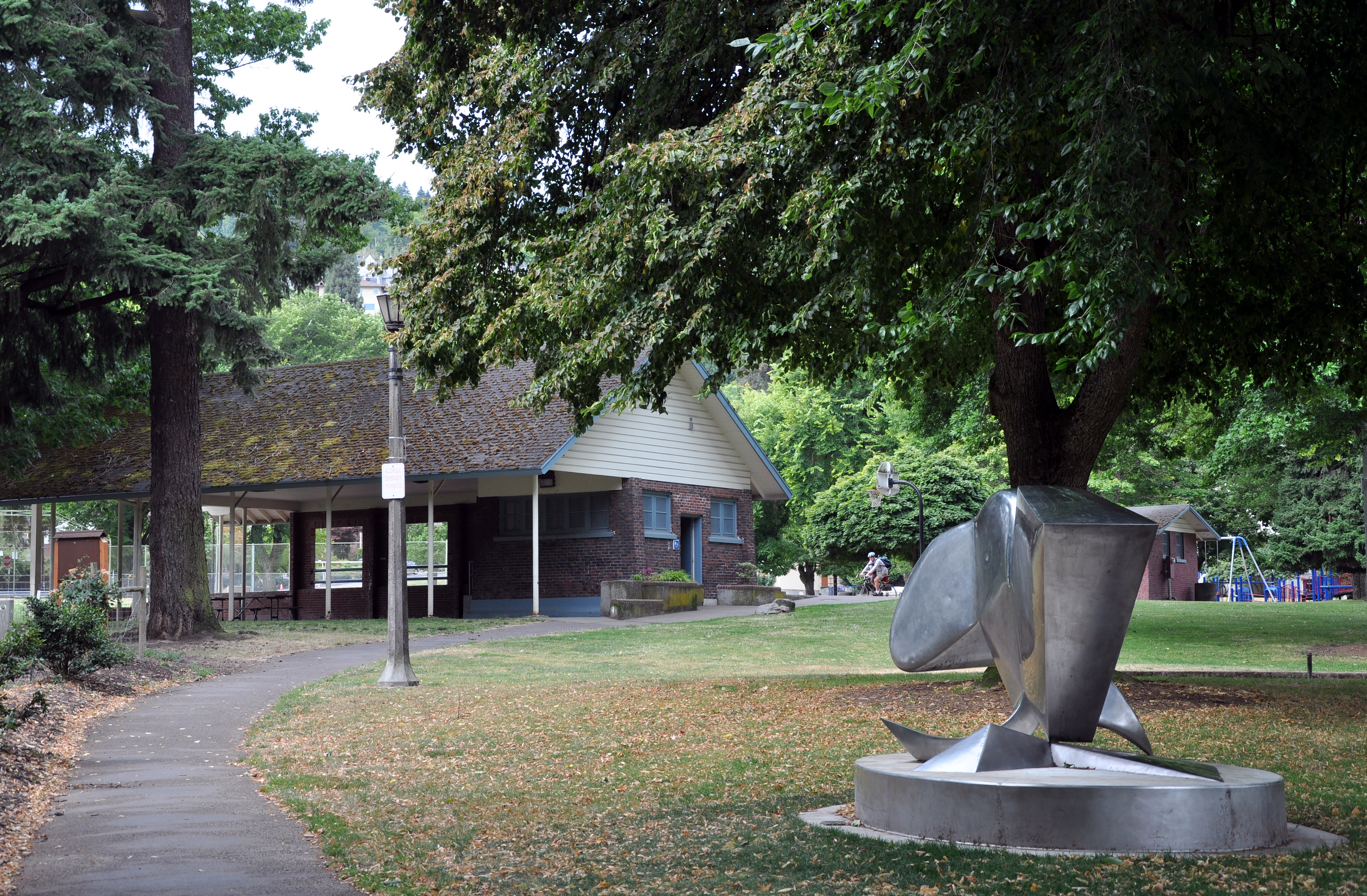
- The sculpture at Wallace Park in 2010
- Artist: Manuel Izquierdo
- Year: 1980
- Type: Sculpture
- Medium: Stainless steel
- Dimensions: 1.8 m × 3.0 m × 1.2 m (6 ft × 10 ft × 4 ft)
- Location: Portland, Oregon, United States; 45.533804°N 122.703276°W
- Owner: City of Portland and Multnomah County Public Art Collection courtesy of the Regional Arts & Culture Council

Silver Dawn is an outdoor 1980 stainless steel sculpture by Spanish American artist Manuel Izquierdo, installed at Wallace Park in northwest Portland, Oregon, in the United States.

== Description and history ==
Silver Dawn is a stainless steel sculpture designed by Manuel Izquierdo, who moved to Portland and became professor emeritus at his alma mater Museum Art School (now Pacific Northwest College of Art) after fleeing Spain following the Spanish–American War. The sculpture was funded by Esco Corporation, Schnitzer, PDC, MAC and NW Service Dist. and completed in 1980. It is installed in Wallace Park at Northwest 25th Avenue and Northwest Raleigh Street and measures 6 feet (1.8 m) x 10 feet (3.0 m) x 4 feet (1.2 m). According to the Regional Arts & Culture Council, which administers the work, Silver Dawn is "an excellent example of the large biomorphic abstract sculptures that Manuel Izquierdo was known for". It is part of the City of Portland and Multnomah County Public Art Collection courtesy of the Regional Arts & Culture Council.

== See also ==
- 1980 in art
- The Dreamer (1979), Portland, Oregon
- Unfolding Rhythms (1987), Portland, Oregon
