= The Dreamer (sculpture) =

Sculpture in Portland, Oregon

- The sculpture in 2015
- Artist: Manuel Izquierdo
- Year: 1979
- Type: Fountain; sculpture
- Medium: Muntz bronze
- Location: Portland, Oregon, United States; 45.51076°N 122.67862°W
- Owner: City of Portland and Multnomah County Public Art Collection courtesy of the Regional Arts & Culture Council

The Dreamer, or simply Dreamer, is an outdoor 1979 muntz bronze sculpture and fountain of a reclining woman by Manuel Izquierdo, installed at Pettygrove Park in Portland, Oregon, United States. It is part of the City of Portland and Multnomah County Public Art Collection courtesy of the Regional Arts & Culture Council, which administers the work.

== Description and history ==
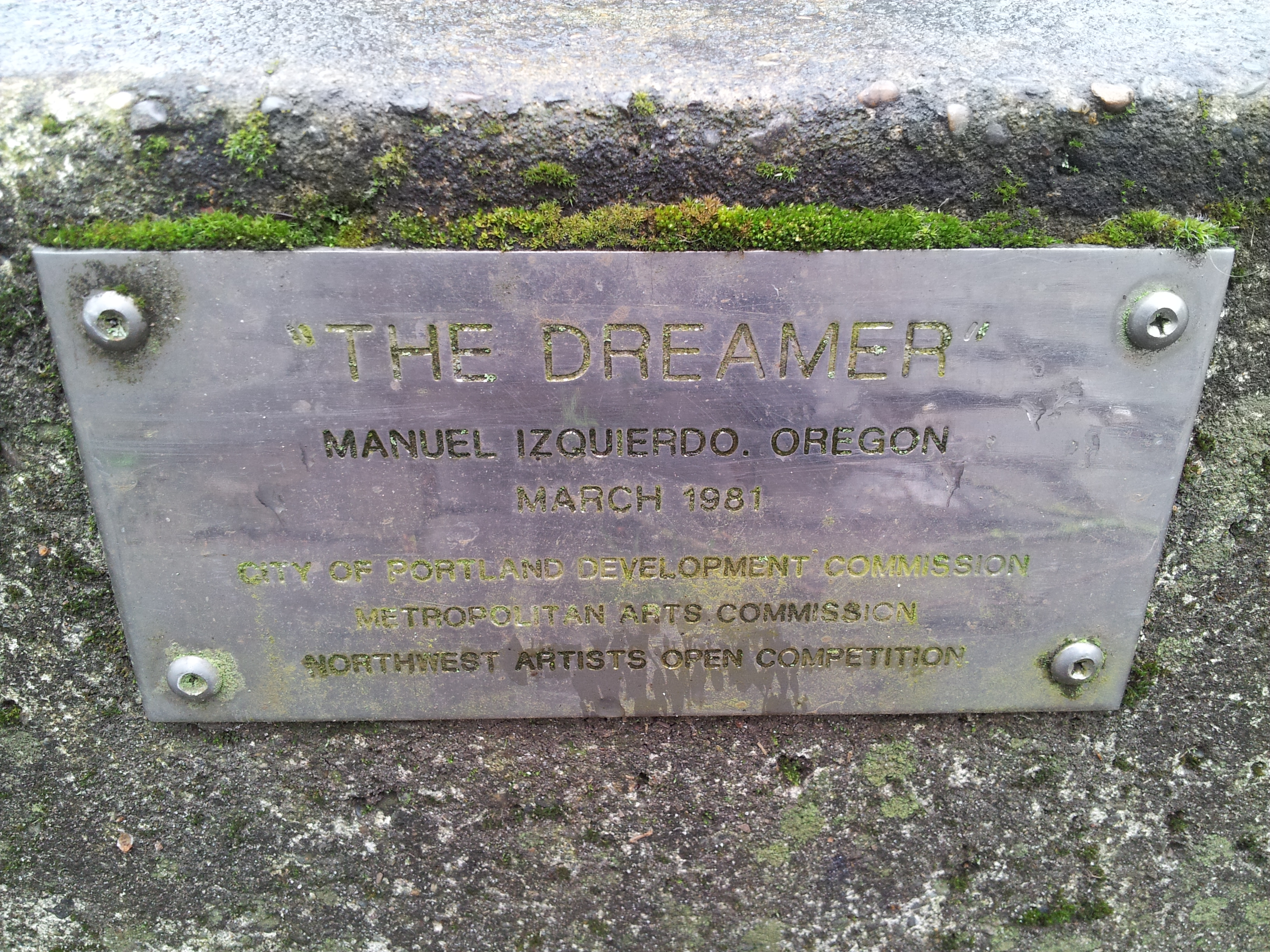
Plaque for the sculpture

Manuel Izquierdo's The Dreamer was funded by the Portland Development Commission and installed at Pettygrove Park (Southwest 3rd Avenue between Market Street and Harrison Street) in downtown Portland in 1979. The Oregon Encyclopedia contributor Roger Hull described the sculpture as a "flowing, abstract form poised on a geometric base sited in a pool of water. Organic and voluptuous, it is a modern river goddess. Izquierdo's faultlessly drop-welded seams (internal to the work and thus invisible) give the piece a taut clarity despite its sensuousness." Izquierdo purchased and cleaned surplus Navy bronze, then filled the sculpture with foam so that falling rain would create a "gentle sound like a kettledrum", rather than a ringing sound produced from rain hitting a hollow structure. He has said the work "speaks of hope, of beauty and serenity, of love, and for a better life in our midst".

The Dreamer is part of the City of Portland and Multnomah County Public Art Collection courtesy of the Regional Arts & Culture Council, which administers the sculpture.

== See also ==
- 1979 in art
- Fountains in Portland, Oregon
- List of public art in Portland, Oregon
- Silver Dawn (1980) and Unfolding Rhythms (1987), other works by Izquiero in Portland, Oregon
