= Thomas Polk Park =

Pocket Park in Charlotte, North Carolina

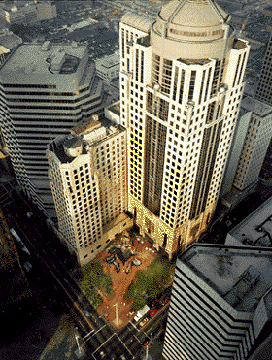
- Thomas Polk Park from Above
- Interactive map of Thomas Polk Park
- Type: Pocket park
- Location: Charlotte, North Carolina
- Coordinates: 35°13′38″N 80°50′37″W
- Area: 1,510 square yards (1,260 m^{2})
- Created: 1991
- Designer: Angela Danadjieva
- Etymology: Thomas Polk
- Owner: City of Charlotte
- Operator: Charlotte Center City Partners
- Public transit: Tryon Street

Thomas Polk Park was located in Charlotte, North Carolina, and comprised the west quadrant of Independence Square, at the intersection of Trade and Tryon Streets. Named for Thomas Polk, a founding father of Charlotte and among the residents and officials of Mecklenburg County who drafted and adopted the Mecklenburg Resolves.

== History ==
Appointed by the Charlotte Mecklenburg Planning Commission, in 1993 Danadjieva & Koenig Associates designed the award - winning Thomas Polk Park - the main open space of the city's business district. The $1.2 million project celebrated Charlotte's historic location, the Square, the site of Native American crossroads, and The Declaration of Independence. The park's fountains, plantings and pavings lead to the Square at the intersection of Trade and Tryon Streets.

=== Design and features ===
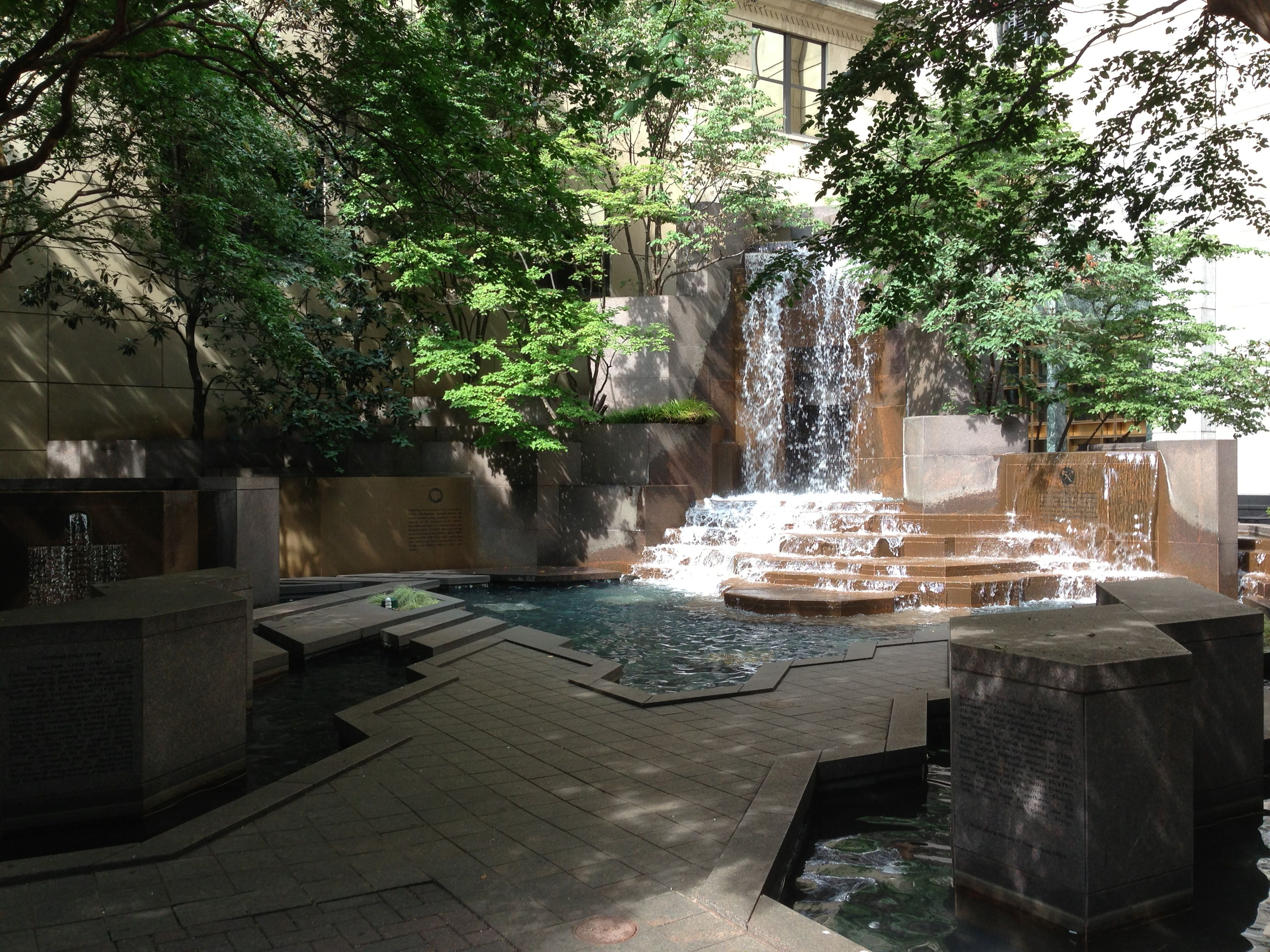
Park features a 30-foot (9.1 m) cascading waterfall fountain.

The park was designed with strong diagonal lines crossing the intersection to reinforce the streets grid. Designed as a respite for Uptown workers to enjoy a break in their day and a refreshment amongst lush plantings and a 30-foot (9.1 m) cascading waterfall. The park had also incorporated a relief map in bronze and granite showing Charlotte in 1780, at the Battle of Charlotte. Red granite in various shades reflected the Piedmont's distinctive red clay. Patterns inspired by Indian motifs connected the four corners and recalled Trade and Tryon as Indian paths. Granite pillars 25 feet (7.6 m) high acted as gateways and, with carved dates and figures, memorialized historic events.

It had trees and water features along the edge of the park, with low granite ledges for sitting. The open area had been used as stage for musical performances and other events. Carved reliefs of historic figures, such as Revolutionary War Gen. Nathaniel Greene, were behind the water. A mini-museum beneath the cascade had exhibits on historical subjects such as gold mining, along with an information booth and Ticketron outlet.

=== Demolition and rebranding ===
On March 13, 2023 the Charlotte City Council approved a proposal to reinvigorate and rename the park after Hugh McColl, former chairman and CEO of Bank of America; this was followed by a commitment of $10 million fundraised by the Hugh McColl Park Coalition. In May 2023, the city committed $350 thousand to the demolition of Thomas Polk Park, razing the centerpiece fountain designed by Angela Danadjieva.
