= Unfolding Rhythms =

Sculpture in Portland, Oregon

- Artist: Manuel Izquierdo
- Year: 1987
- Type: Sculpture
- Medium: Painted metal
- Dimensions: 3.0 m × 1.7 m × 1.7 m (10 ft × 5.5 ft × 5.5 ft)
- Condition: "Treatment needed" (1993)
- Location: Portland, Oregon, United States; 45.52122°N 122.67657°W

Unfolding Rhythms is an outdoor 1987 sculpture by Manuel Izquierdo, located in Portland, Oregon, United States.

== Description and history ==
Manuel Izquierdo's Unfolding Rhythms (1987) is an abstract painted metal sculpture, installed outside the Oregon Dental Services (ODS) Building on Southwest Fifth Avenue between Oak Street and Stark Street. It measures approximately 10 feet (3.0 m) x 5.5 feet (1.7 m) x 5.5 feet (1.7 m). The sculpture was funded by ODS and is enclosed by a fence at night. An inscription on its northeast side reads, "UNFOLDING RHYTHMS / Manuel Izquierdo / 2-10-1987" (the copyright date), and displays a copyright symbol with the artist's signature.

The sculpture was surveyed and considered "treatment needed" by the Smithsonian's "Save Outdoor Sculpture!" program in 1993.

== Reception ==
Unfolding Rhythms has been included in at least one published walking tour of Portland.

== See also ==
- 1987 in art
- The Dreamer (1979), Portland, Oregon
- Silver Dawn (1980), Portland, Oregon
