= Salmon Street Springs =

Fountain in Portland, Oregon, U.S.

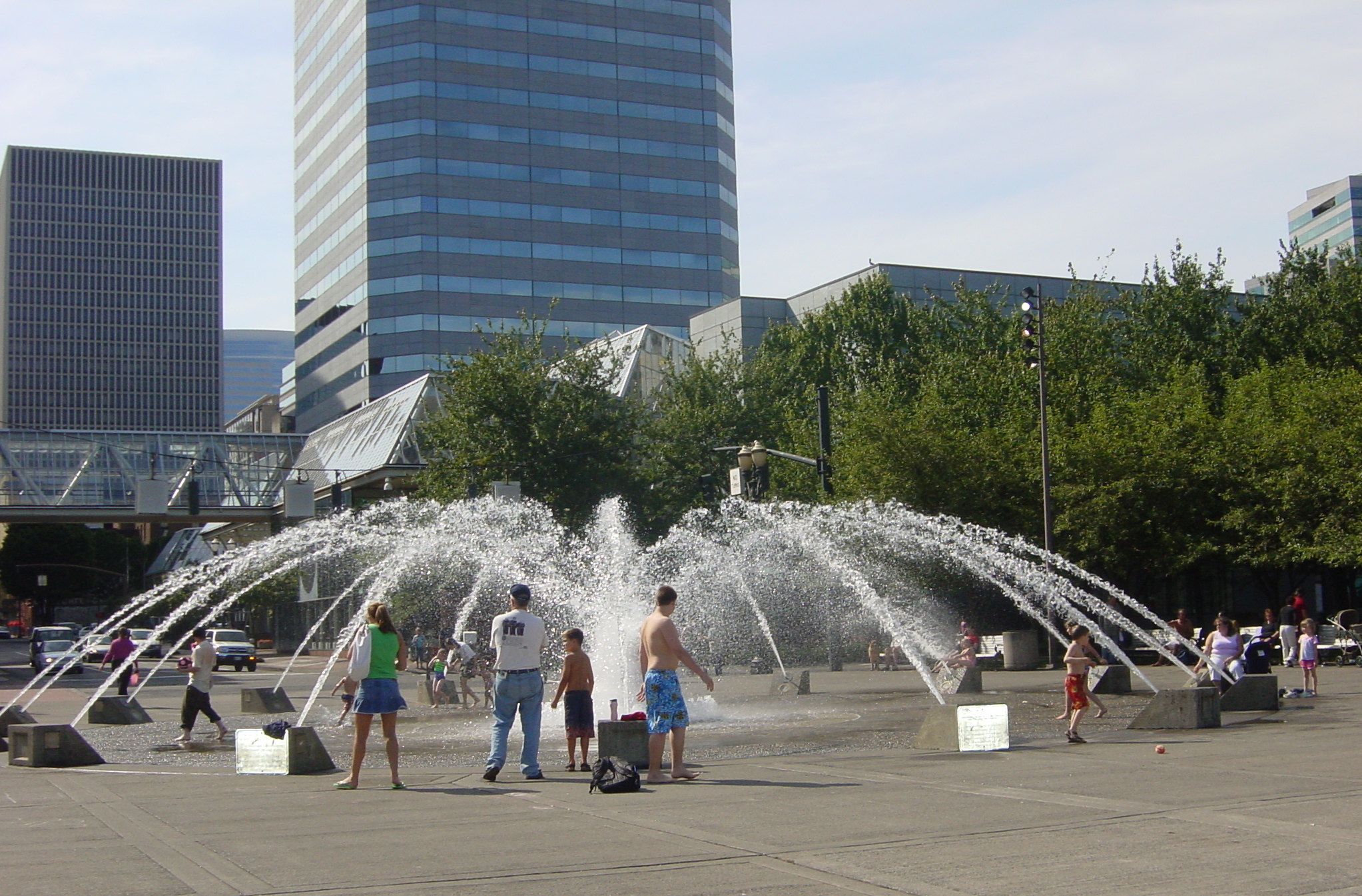
- The fountain in 2005
- Location: Portland, Oregon, U.S.
- Location within Oregon
- Coordinates: 45.51537°N 122.67333°W

Salmon Street Springs, or Salmon Street Fountain, is an outdoor water fountain at the intersection of Naito Parkway at Southwest Salmon in Tom McCall Waterfront Park in Portland, Oregon, United States. It was designed by Robert Perron Landscape Architects and Planners and dedicated in 1988. The fountain's three water displays, which are regulated by a computer, are called "bollards", "misters", and "wedding cake".

According to Portland Parks & Recreation, the fountain can recycle up to 4,924 US gallons (18,640 L) of water per minute through as many as 137 of its 185 jets. Salmon Street Springs is considered "interactive" and open from 6:00 a.m. to 10:00 p.m. during the Spring, Summer, and Fall months.

== See also ==
- Fountains in Portland, Oregon
