= Chiming Fountain =

Fountain and sculpture in Portland, Oregon

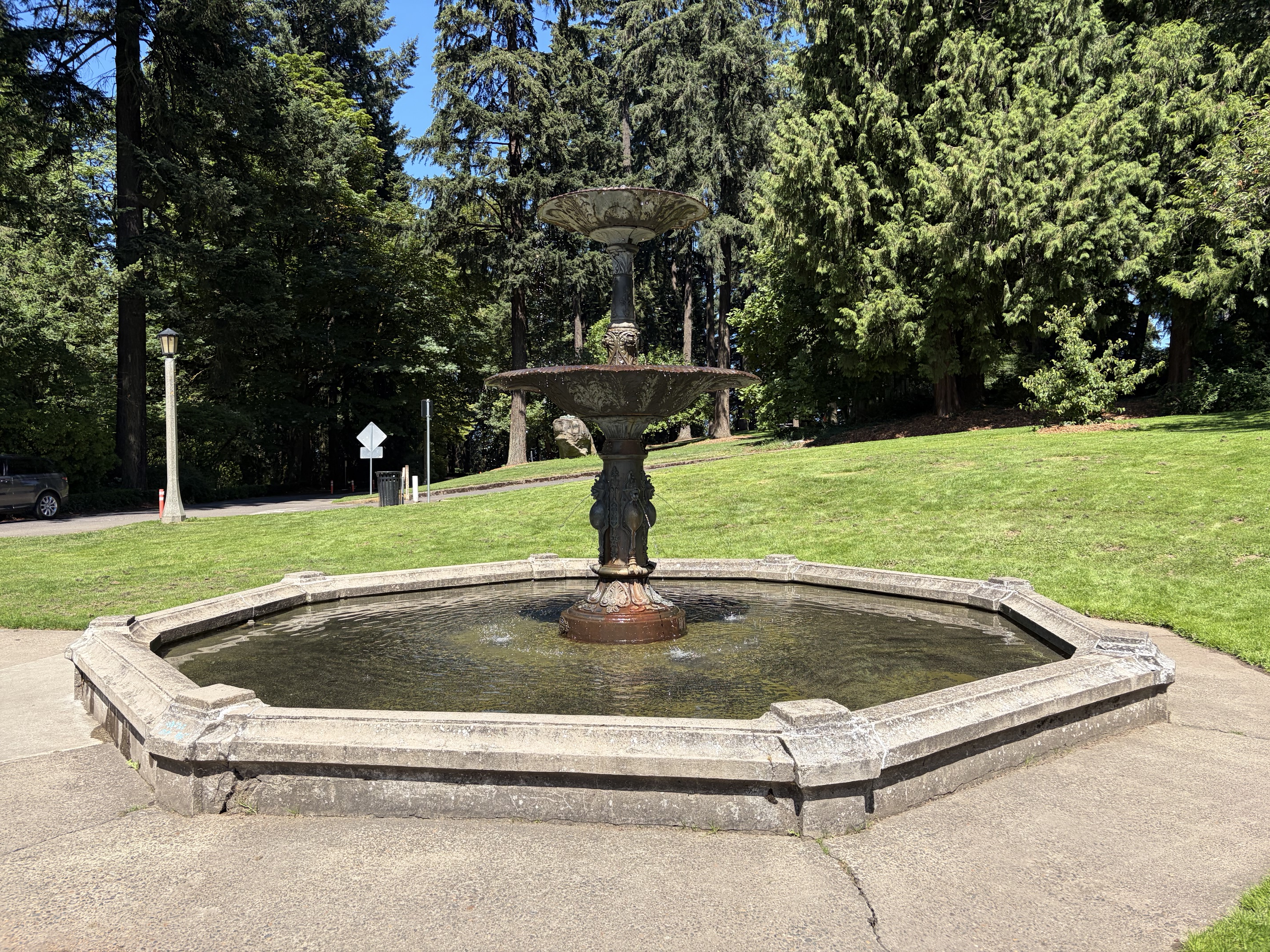
- The fountain in 2026
- Artist: John "Hans" Staehli
- Year: 1891
- Type: Fountain; sculpture
- Medium: Cast iron; bronze; concrete
- Dimensions: 3.7 m (12 ft); 2.1 m diameter (7 ft)
- Condition: "Treatment urgent" (1994)
- Location: Portland, Oregon, United States; 45°31′16″N 122°42′10″W
- Owner: City of Portland's Metropolitan Arts Commission

The Chiming Fountain, also known as Cupid's Fountain, the John Staehli Fountain, Portland's City Park Fountain and Washington Park Fountain, is an outdoor cast iron fountain and sculpture built in 1891 by John "Hans" Staehli. It is installed in Washington Park in Portland, Oregon, United States. The fountain's name derives from the sound made when water drips from the upper basin. Staehli designed the fountain to serve as a watering trough for horses pulling carriages into the park. Based on a Renaissance fountain, it was originally painted white and included a statuette of a boy, possibly depicting Cupid, though the figure was damaged and permanently removed from the sculpture before or during the 1940s.

The fountain was restored in 1960, but no longer functioned. Its condition was deemed "treatment urgent" by the Smithsonian Institution's "Save Outdoor Sculpture!" program in February 1994. Since then, its water-pumping function has also been restored. Chiming Fountain has been included in published biking and walking tours of Portland and has been mentioned as a highlight of Washington Park in guides recommending family-friendly activities in the city.

== Description and history ==
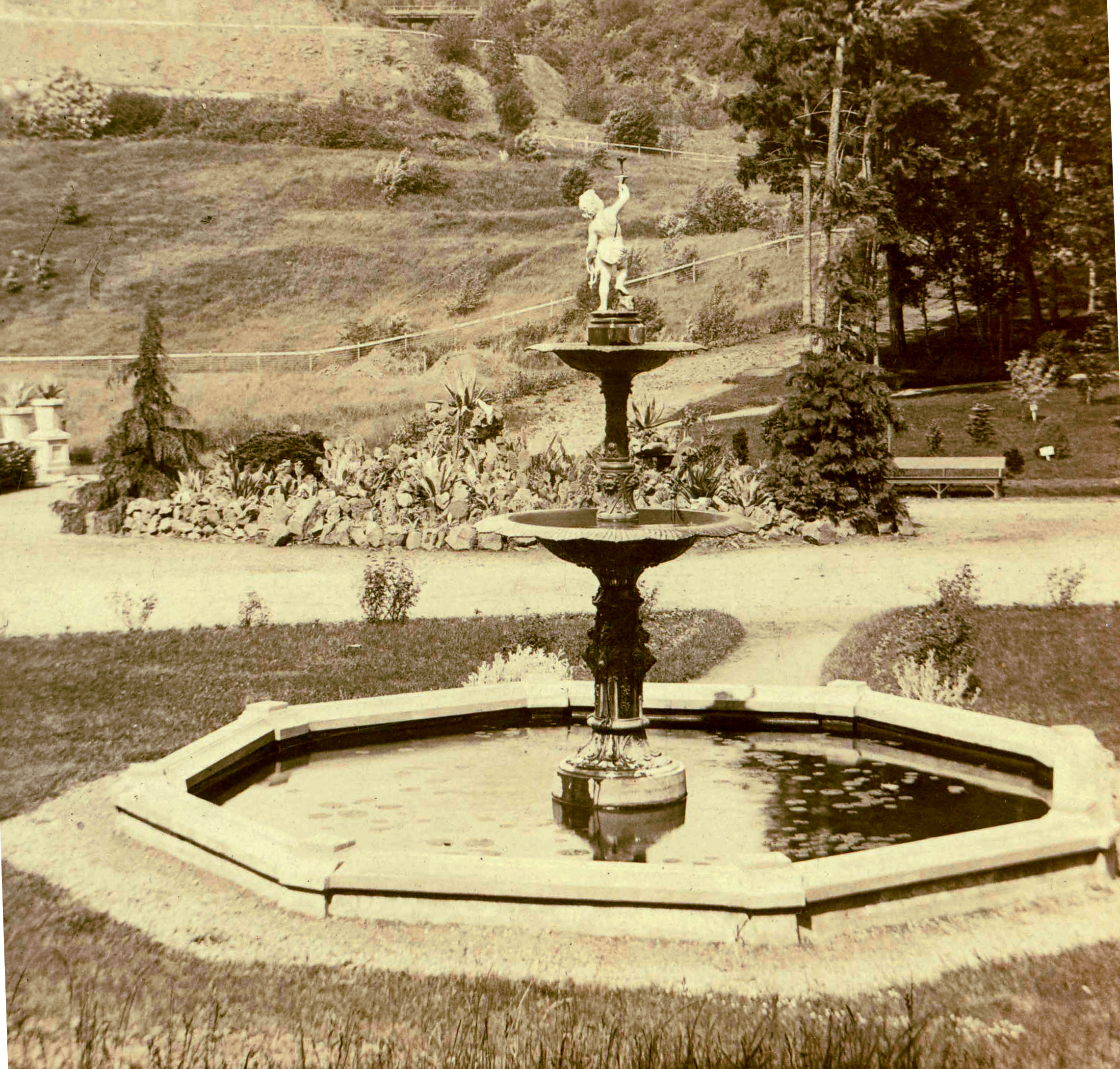
The fountain topped by a statuette of a boy, in a 1901 photograph

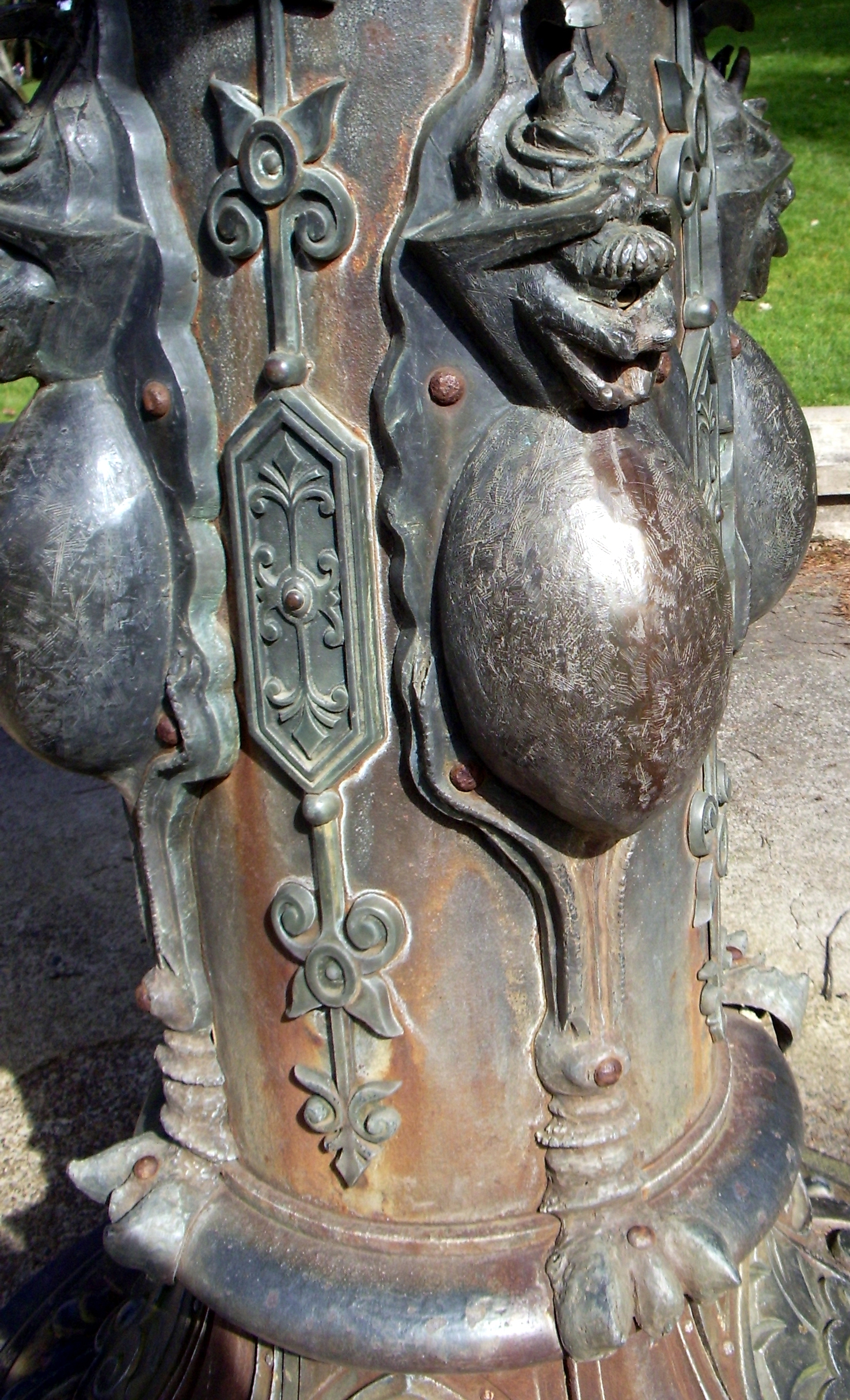
Detail of the horned gargoyle-like figures

The decorative fountain is located at the junction of Southwest Sacajawea Boulevard and Southwest Sherwood Boulevard in the main circle of Washington Park. It was designed by John "Hans" Staehli, a woodcarver from Switzerland who immigrated to Portland and was known for his decorative carvings of churches. The fountain was commissioned by the city in 1891 for $400 and completed by Staehli later that year, becoming the city's second piece of public art. It served as a watering trough for horses pulling carriages into the park. The fountain has been given many different names, but is most commonly referred to as Chiming Fountain, in reference to the sound made by water dripping from the upper basin.

The fountain is made of cast iron and measures approximately 12 feet (3.7 m) tall with a 7-foot (2.1 m) diameter. It has a pedestal and two round bronze basins separated by a narrow post, and stands in an octagonal concrete base which served as a retaining pool. The pedestal has four horned gargoyle-like figures. On the bottom of the pedestal's west side is an unsigned inscription which reads: "J. Staehli/Portland, Org./64 Second St."

Staehli's design is based on a Renaissance fountain and was originally painted white. The central post originally held a figure of a boy carrying a staff (or possibly a fish or a torch) from which water spouted. Some sources suggest the figure depicted Cupid, hence one of the fountain's nicknames, "Cupid's Fountain". According to Portland Parks & Recreation, the figure was last recorded in 1912 in a photograph of Willis McElroy's band in the nearby bandstand. However, in the 1920s, freezing weather expanded water in the fountain, damaging the figure. The boy statuette was removed from the fountain and discarded by the 1940s, and it was not replaced.

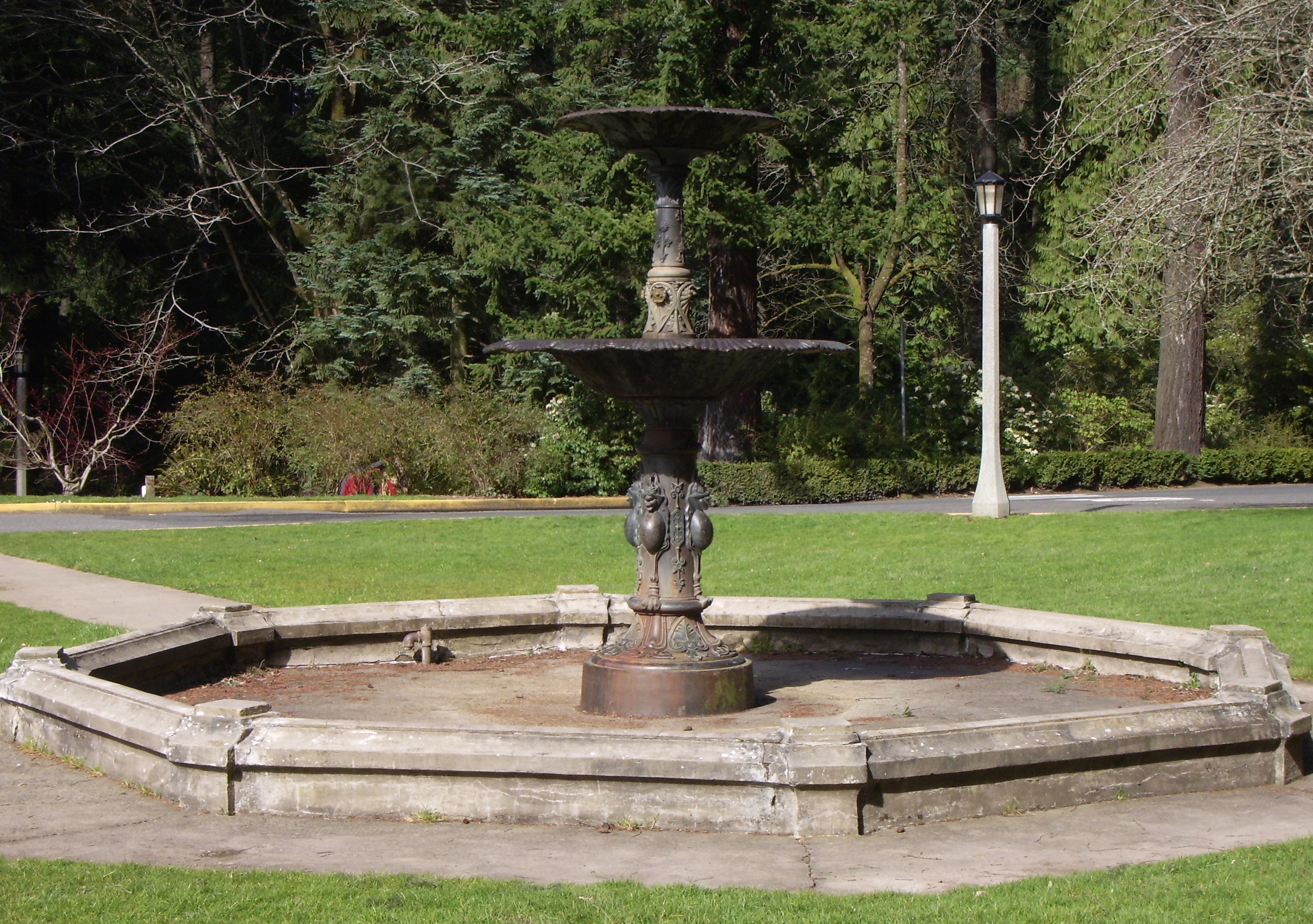
The statue in 2006, without water running.

The city planned to remove the fountain in 1960 due to disrepair. However, Mayor Terry Schrunk instructed the parks bureau to begin a restoration after Francis J. Murnane, a local longshoreman and advocate for historic preservation, appealed its removal. Much of its original decoration was absent, so replicas of existing pieces were constructed at a cost of $450. The restoration cost around $1,775, including assembly and installation. Despite its restoration, the fountain was no longer functional. Its condition was deemed "treatment urgent" by the Smithsonian Institution's "Save Outdoor Sculpture!" program in February 1994. Since then, the fountain's plumbing has been restored. According to Smithsonian, the fountain is administered by the City of Portland's Metropolitan Arts Commission.

== Reception ==
The fountain has been included in published biking and walking tours of the city, including one which described it as "elegant". It was also mentioned as a highlight of Washington Park in the 2010 guidebook Best Places: Portland and by Delta Sky Magazine. Similarly, Chiming Fountain has been included in descriptions of the park in guides recommending child-friendly activities and sites in the city. These guides include the website TravelforKids.com and the 2009 book The 10 Best of Everything Families: An Ultimate Guide for Travelers, which listed Washington Park as one of the ten "Best Parks and Playgrounds" in the Northwestern United States.

== See also ==
- 1891 in art
- Drinking fountains in the United States
