= Animals in Pools =

Sculpture series in Portland, Oregon, U.S.

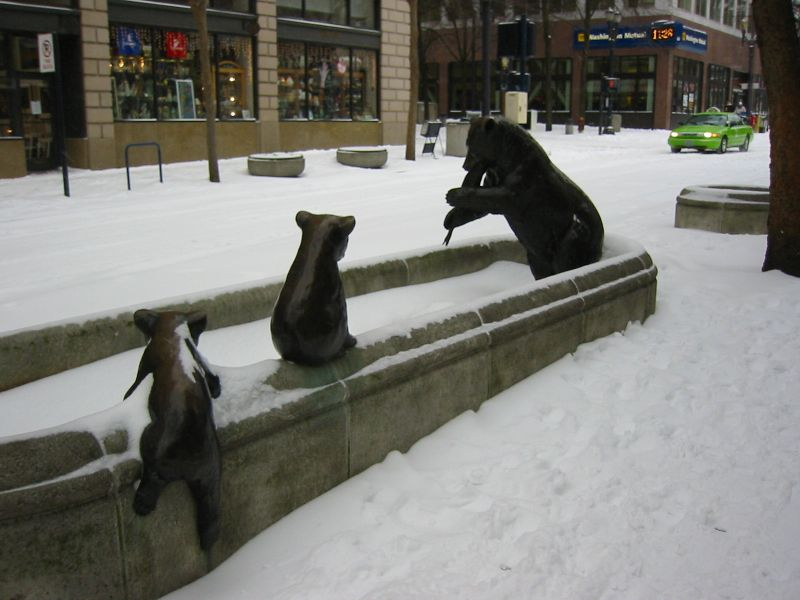
- Depiction of a mother bear fishing for her two cubs, pictured on a snowy day in Portland, Oregon in 2003
- Artist: Georgia Gerber
- Year: 1986
- Type: Sculpture
- Medium: Bronze
- Location: Portland, Oregon, United States; 45°31′08″N 122°40′42″W
- Owner: City of Portland and Multnomah County Public Art Collection courtesy of the Regional Arts & Culture Council

Animals in Pools is a series of fountains and bronze sculptures of Pacific Northwest animals, designed by American artist Georgia Gerber and located in Portland, Oregon, in the United States. The series was installed in 1986 as part of the renovations associated with construction of the MAX Light Rail. Funded by the Downtown Merchants Local Improvement District, TriMet, and the United States Department of Transportation, the sculptures were presented as gifts to the city and remain part of the collection of the City of Portland and Multnomah County Public Art Collection courtesy of the Regional Arts & Culture Council.

== Description and history ==
Animals in Pools is a series of ten trough-style fountains and twenty-five life size bronze sculptures of Pacific Northwest animals, designed by American artist Georgia Gerber and installed in 1986 as part of the renovations associated with MAX Light Rail construction. Funded by the Downtown Merchants Local Improvement District, TriMet and the United States Department of Transportation, the sculptures were presented as gifts to the city. The pieces were installed on the block bounded by Southwest Yamhill and Morrison Streets and Southwest Fifth and Sixth Avenues in downtown Portland. Animals in Pools is in the collection of the City of Portland and Multnomah County Public Art Collection courtesy of the Regional Arts & Culture Council.

Gerber described Animals in Pools as "art for the people", designed in a way that encourages interactivity and "[brings] a bit of Pacific Northwestern wildlife to downtown in a fun and unexpected way". Depicted animals include a mother bear fishing for her two cubs, beavers, deer, ducks, otters, and sea lions. The fountains run all day during the spring, summer and fall seasons.

== Reception ==
According to the Regional Arts & Culture Council, which maintains the work, the animal sculptures "are some of the most beloved in the public art collection as can be seen by the many shiny spots resulting from years of petting and cuddling".

== See also ==
- 1986 in art
