= Essential Forces =

Fountain in Portland, Oregon, U.S.

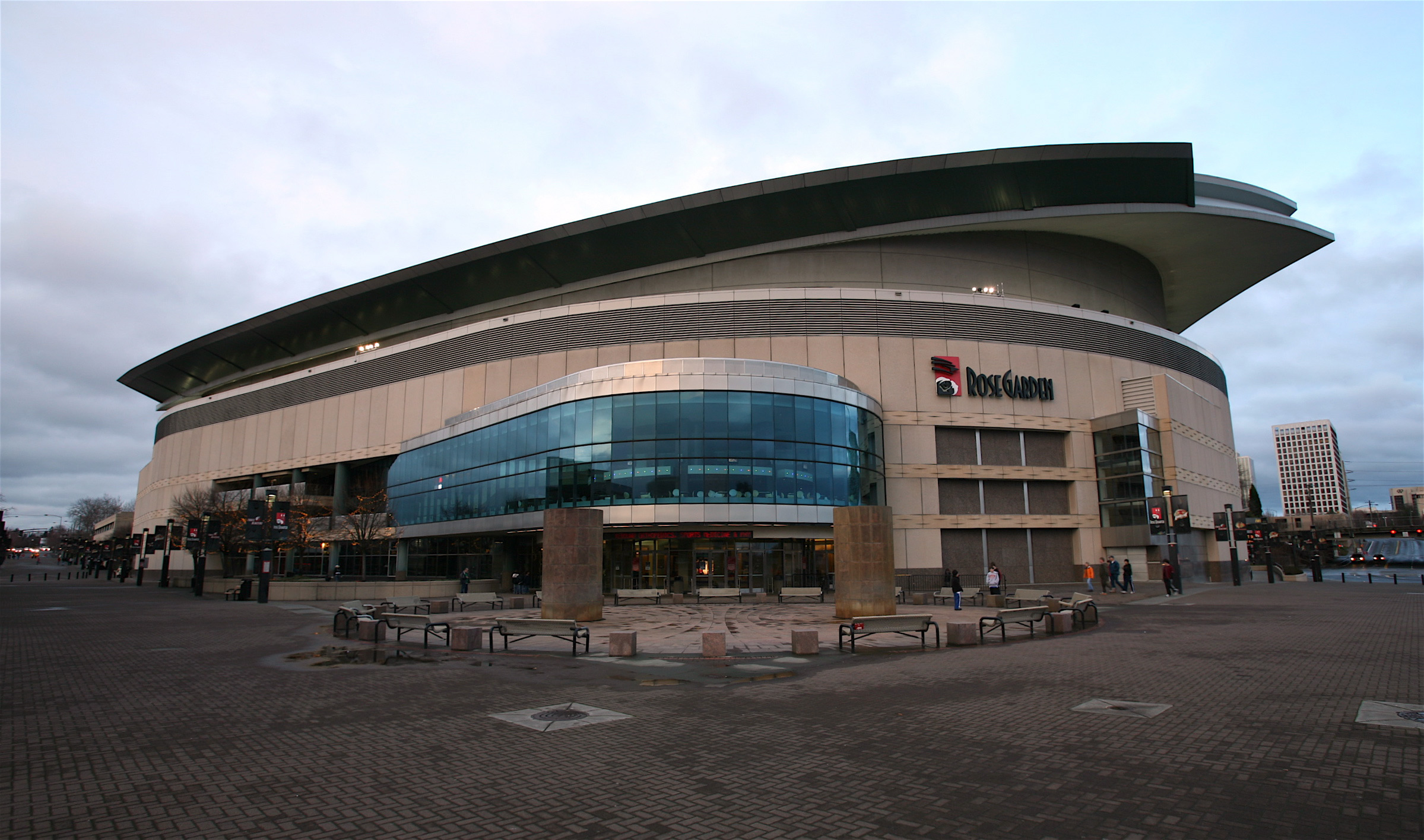
- The fountain and stone pillars outside the arena, 2007
- Year: 1995
- Location: Portland, Oregon, U.S.; 45.53092°N 122.66761°W

Essential Forces, or the Essential Forces Fountain, is a fountain outside Portland, Oregon's Moda Center, in the United States. The water feature was created by WET Design of Los Angeles, and its stone pillars once shot out fire. It is "computerized" and was donated to the city by Paul Allen. The fountain was completed in 1995 and has 500 water jets.
