= Keller Fountain Park =

Public park in Portland, Oregon, U.S.

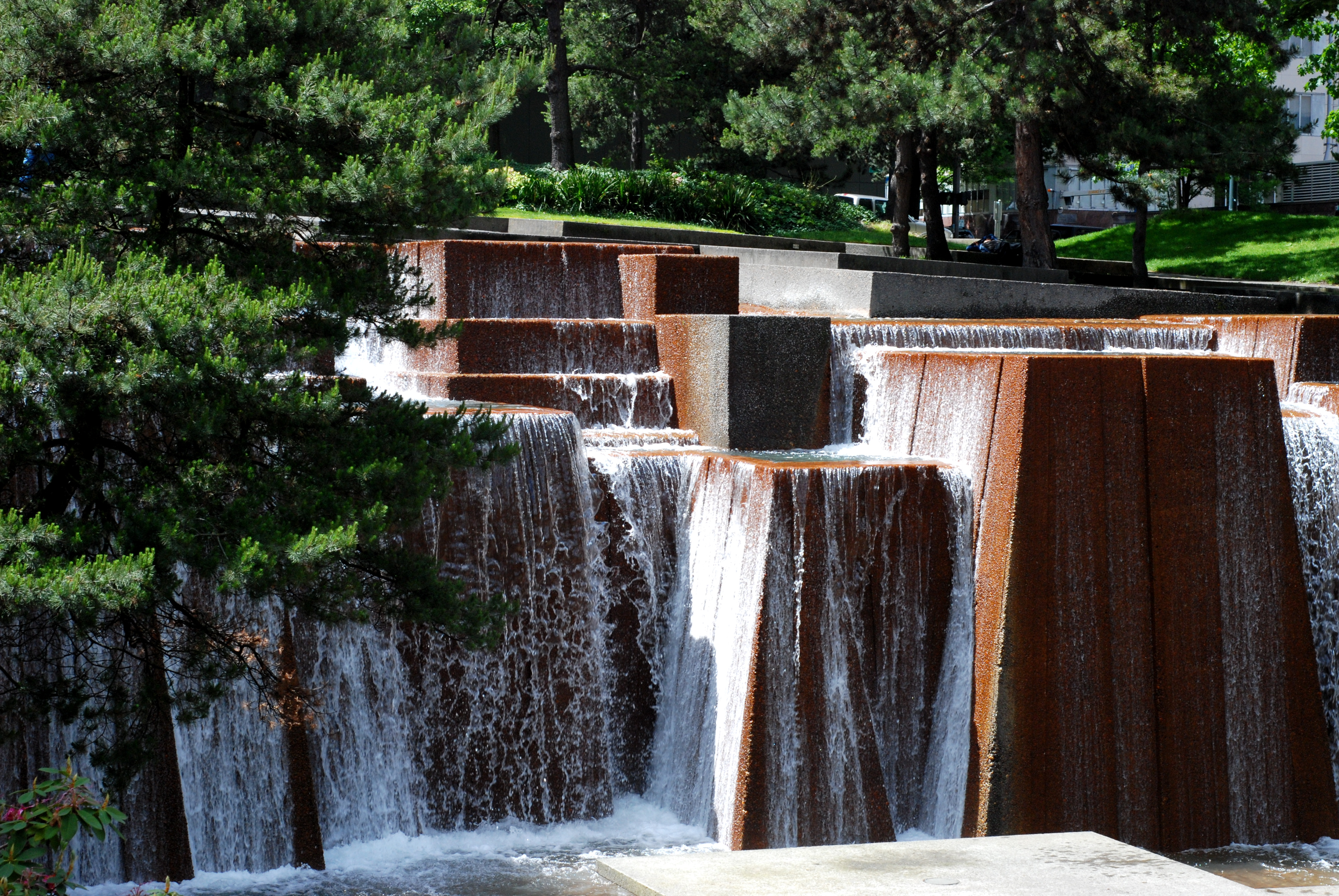
- Keller Fountain with water flowing

- Location within Portland, Oregon
- Type: Urban park
- Location: SW 3rd Ave. and Clay St. Portland, Oregon
- Coordinates: 45.5127°N 122.6792°W
- Area: 0.92 acres (0.37 ha)
- Created: 1970
- Operator: Portland Parks & Recreation
- Status: Open 5 a.m. to midnight daily

Keller Fountain Park is a city park in downtown Portland, Oregon. Originally named Forecourt Fountain or Auditorium Forecourt, the 0.92-acre (0.37 ha) park opened in 1970 across Third Avenue from what was then Civic Auditorium. In 1978, the park was renamed after Ira C. Keller, head of the Portland Development Commission (PDC) from 1958 to 1972. Civic Auditorium was renamed as Keller Auditorium in 2000, but is named in honor of Ira's son, Richard B. Keller.

The central feature of the park is the concrete water fountain. Keller Fountain is often noted as a memorable feature of the public landscape in downtown Portland, and in 1999 was awarded a medallion from the American Society of Landscape Architects. The fountain was designed by Angela Danadjieva using inspiration from waterfalls in the Columbia River Gorge located east of Portland. While the park is named Keller Fountain Park, the fountain itself is named Ira Keller Fountain. The fountain's pools hold 75,000 US gallons (280,000 L; 62,000 imp gal) of water, while the waterfalls pump 13,000 US gallons (49,000 L; 11,000 imp gal) per minute over the cascade.

== History ==
Prior to being a park, the block was the location of a popular tavern run by Bud Clark, who was later to become a mayor of Portland. Clark purchased the tavern formerly known as "Dot Tavern" for $1,600, including acquisition of the lease for the building. Clark renamed it the Spatenhaus and it was reopened in October 1962. As the area was already part of the South Auditorium urban renewal area, Clark lost the lease when the PDC acquired the block in May 1967. The firm of Skidmore, Owings and Merrill was then asked by PDC to draw plans for the park, which foresaw a fountain, a traffic turnaround, and underground parking for 150 cars. Protests were raised however, by Walter Gordon, the architectural adviser to the PDC, and in July 1968 the Lawrence Halprin & Associates landscape design firm was commissioned in to design the park, partly due to Gordon's advocacy.

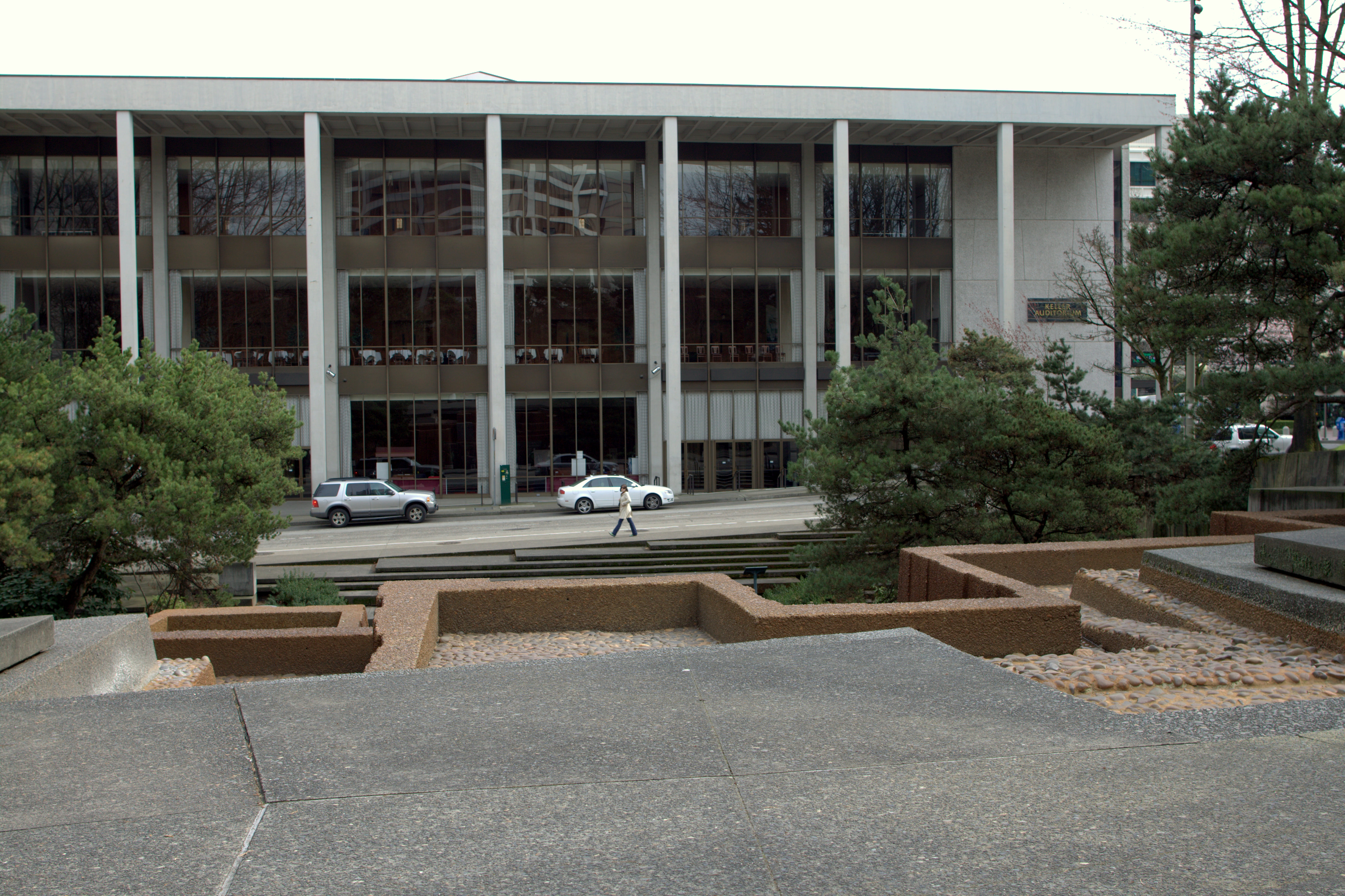
Top of Keller Fountain with Keller Auditorium visible

Angela Danadjieva, a designer at Lawrence Halprin & Associates, was charged with the artistic conception. Danadjieva began her career in design with work on Constructivist set designs for the Bulgarian State Film agency. In the early 1960s she defected to Paris and studied at the École des Beaux Arts, and then emigrated to the United States towards the end of the decade. She took her inspiration from a book on waterfalls of the Columbia River Gorge, which was given to her by Ira Keller at the design studio. It was built by the Schrader Construction Company for $512,000.

The plaza was dedicated on June 23, 1970, by Halprin who called for the people of Portland to come together, referring to the Portland State University protests, which had occurred only weeks previously, stating, "I hope this will help us live together as a community, both here and all over this planet Earth". As the water began flowing, Halprin waded into the water, dressed in a jacket and tie. Jane Jacobs, author of The Death and Life of Great American Cities, mayor Terry Schrunk, and PDC chairman Ira Keller attended the fountain opening. In 2003, an article by Randy Gragg in The Oregonian summarized the moment, saying:

[T]he fountain's 1970 unveiling became a local legend. Held in the edgy days following a violent clash between Portland police and antiwar protesters, the dedication took on the mood of a Wild West drama as city officials gathered for speeches at the foot of the fountain and hundreds of youths assembled at the top. When the spigots released the fountain's 13,000-gallon-a-minute flow, however, any tensions quickly dissolved. While the officials politely applauded, the youths jumped in to the rallying cries of "Right on!" "These very straight people have somehow grasped what cities can be all about," Halprin said, turning from dignitaries to revelers to emphasize the democratic spirit underlying his design. "As you play in this garden, please try to remember that we are all in this together".

In 1988, the Portland Water Bureau expressed their surprise at the cost of running the fountain, which at the time was consuming $34,000 in water and $13,000 in electricity each year. Also in 1988, a 26-year-old Vancouver man was drowned when he attempted to swim through a small water pipe and got wedged under a concrete slab. He was taken to the Oregon Health & Science University and was listed in critical condition. According to Portland police, he had been drinking alcohol.

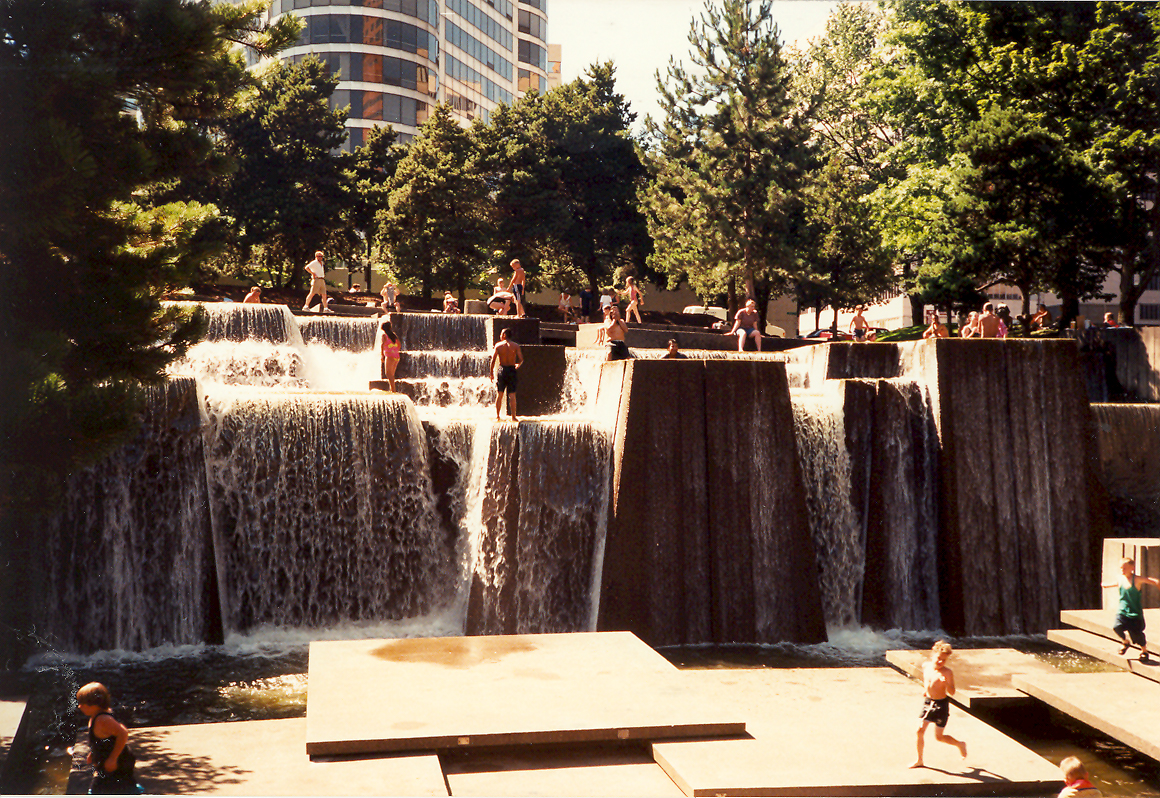
Keller Fountain in 1995, Portland Plaza in background

In 1993, all city departments were requested by mayor Vera Katz to identify areas where budgets could be reduced, and the Portland Water Bureau suggested mothballing fountains, including the Keller Fountain. The Oregonian stated "administrator Mike Rosenberger said the fountains were not an essential service, but he conceded that he would probably be taken out and shot before the public allowed him to shut the water off".

Vandalism from "Soaping", putting dish detergent in the fountain, has been common, and the massive amounts of generated foam cause more than $1000 damage, due to the need to drain and clean the fountain. In the first "soaping" incident soap and green dye was placed in the fountain the night before it opened. Another incident happened in September 2002. In 2007, the Portland Water Bureau posted the name and photograph of a 19-year-old who placed dish soap in the fountain and received a misdemeanor criminal mischief. The public shaming of the teen caused the incident to be discussed in many places, including KATU, The Oregonian, The Portland Mercury ("This is what happens when you screw with the Water Bureau"), and The New York Times ("Don't mess with the Portland Water Bureau"). The fountain was soaped at least four times in August 2007 alone.

From May to late August 1996, the park was closed for a $700,000 refurbishment that included repairs and upgrades to filters and pumps, automated chlorination, restoration of cement, and updating of the lighting system. The fountain was also shut down in 1997 and 1998 for 10 months while the water bureau replaced a 1930s-era pump. The piping was also relined with cross-linked polyethylene in the spring of spring 2000, a costly operation due to the original piping being cast into the concrete.

The Halprin Landscapes Conservancy was formed in 2001 and an article in The New York Times in 2008 stated that Keller was a Portland "ensemble considered to be one of Mr. Halprin's masterpieces".

== Features ==
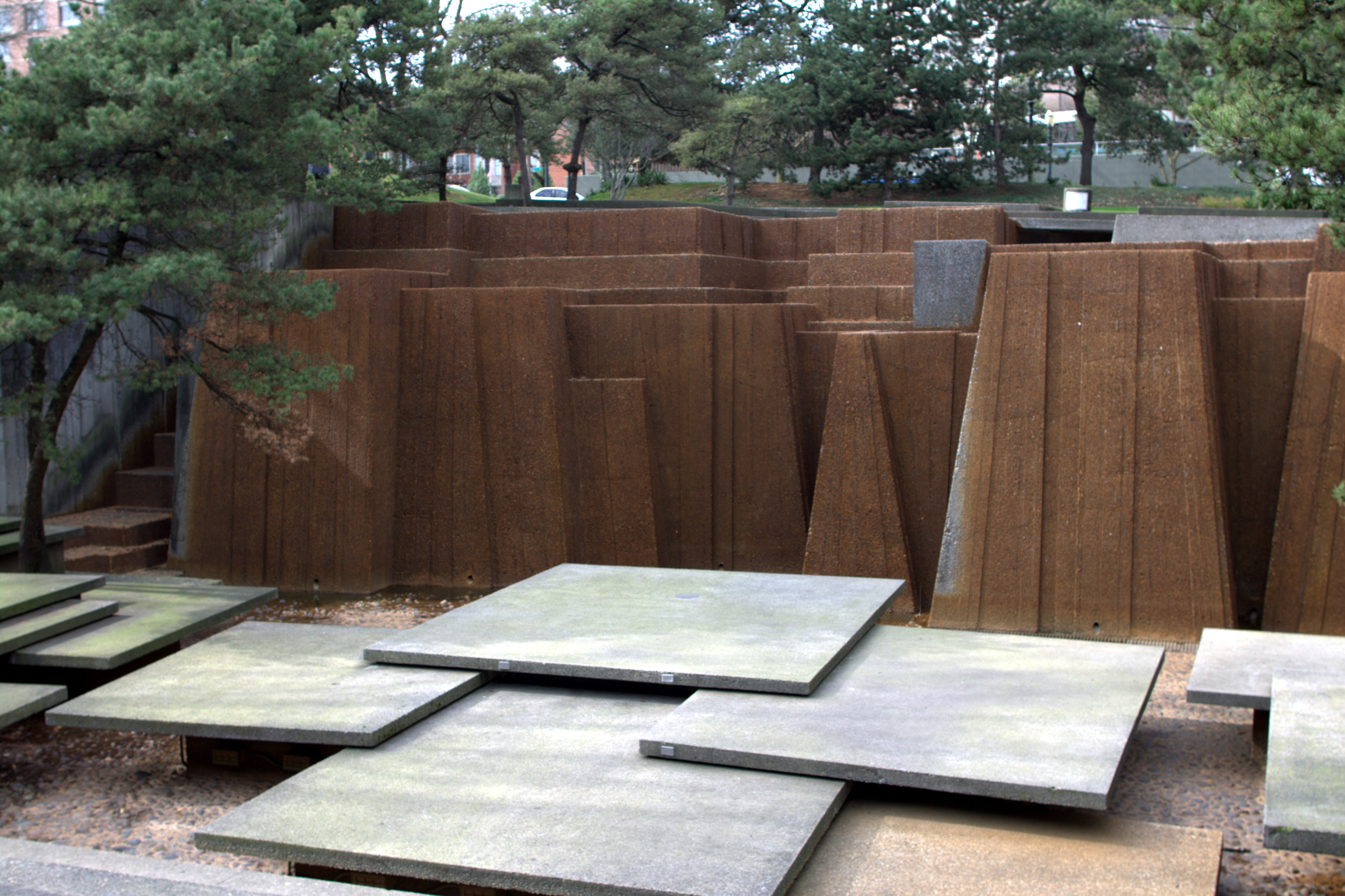
The fountain turned off for winter in 2010

The park holds 75,000 US gallons (280,000 L; 62,000 imp gal) of water, pumping 13,000 US gallons (49,000 L; 11,000 imp gal) per minute through the waterfalls. While Portland Parks & Recreation maintains the park, in 1988 the Portland Water Bureau assumed responsibility for the fountain.

The park, which is known for its accessibility for allowing visitors to stand at the top of the waterfall, is designed according to construction code to prevent children or adults from falling down the waterfall; the top of the falls are actually 36 inches (910 mm) pockets of water, acting as a safety wall. City officials were worried about liability from falls and had wanted a fence put across the top.

Trees in the park include shore pines. For many years, the park has been home to a popular food cart serving bento.

=== Events ===
In 1987, Tom Grant played a piano solo in the park for a KGW TV public service advertisement. In 1988, a parade and march of The Music Man began at the fountain, walking to Pioneer Courthouse Square with actors John Davidson and Sally Spencer.

In September 2008, the Time-Based Art Festival included the "City Dance of Lawrence and Anna Halprin", held at the fountain. The Oregonian called the performance "a major event and brilliant achievement". The event included music by Morton Subotnick.

== Reception ==
In June 1970, Ada Louise Huxtable said it "may be one of the most important urban spaces since the Renaissance", comparing it to the Piazza Navona and the Trevi Fountain. An article for The New York Times by Ivan Doig discussed how Portland's "livability" didn't contribute to its "visitability", pointing out that the Forecourt Fountain and lunchtime was "one more moment of Portland's showing some loveliness and then getting back to its self-assured routine of life". The Oregonian wrote that Halprin's parks "changed the way American landscape architects thought about city parks, and it sparked a Portland tradition of great urban plazas and parks". In 2003, New York's Thomas Balsley said, "I love the Lovejoy and Forecourt fountains" when asked what Portland open spaces stood out the most to him.

In 1999, the park was awarded a centennial medallion from the American Society of Landscape Architects in a ceremony with Vera Katz on July 29.

According to Steven Koch of the Halprin Landscapes Conservancy, the parks in Lawrence's Portland Open Space Sequence represent local geography: Source Fountain is above the timberline, Lovejoy Fountain and Pettygrove Park are in the middle, and Keller Fountain represents "the foothills with the roaring falls". A writer in the Oregonian said the fountain "is an abstraction of a mountain waterfall". Local architect Marcy McInelly said "they were the first full realization of a theory about reflecting forces of nature but not mimicking natural forms. People came from all over the world to see them". Bob Gerding, who turned the First Regiment Armory Annex into the LEED Platinum-rated performing arts center, said that in 25 years, "I hope [the Armory is] loved by the city. I hope people love to see plays there or have a meeting there or whatever, that it becomes just a cool thing in the city, like the Keller Fountain".

In 2006, Laurie Olin said the Halprin's Portland sequence was "a huge influence on even becoming a landscape architect. I had gone off to Europe and saw them published there. They had to do with representation and meaning but also had an exuberance. They are landmark pieces. When Ada Louis Huxtable wrote in The New York Times that Forecourt Fountain (in front of Keller Auditorium) was the greatest civic fountain since the Renaissance, I knew she was right. They were also transformative for the field of landscape architecture, not all for the best, because there were a lot of bad copies and wannabes".

== See also ==
- Fountains in Portland, Oregon
- List of parks in Portland, Oregon
