= Lovejoy Fountain Park =

Public park in Portland, Oregon, U.S.

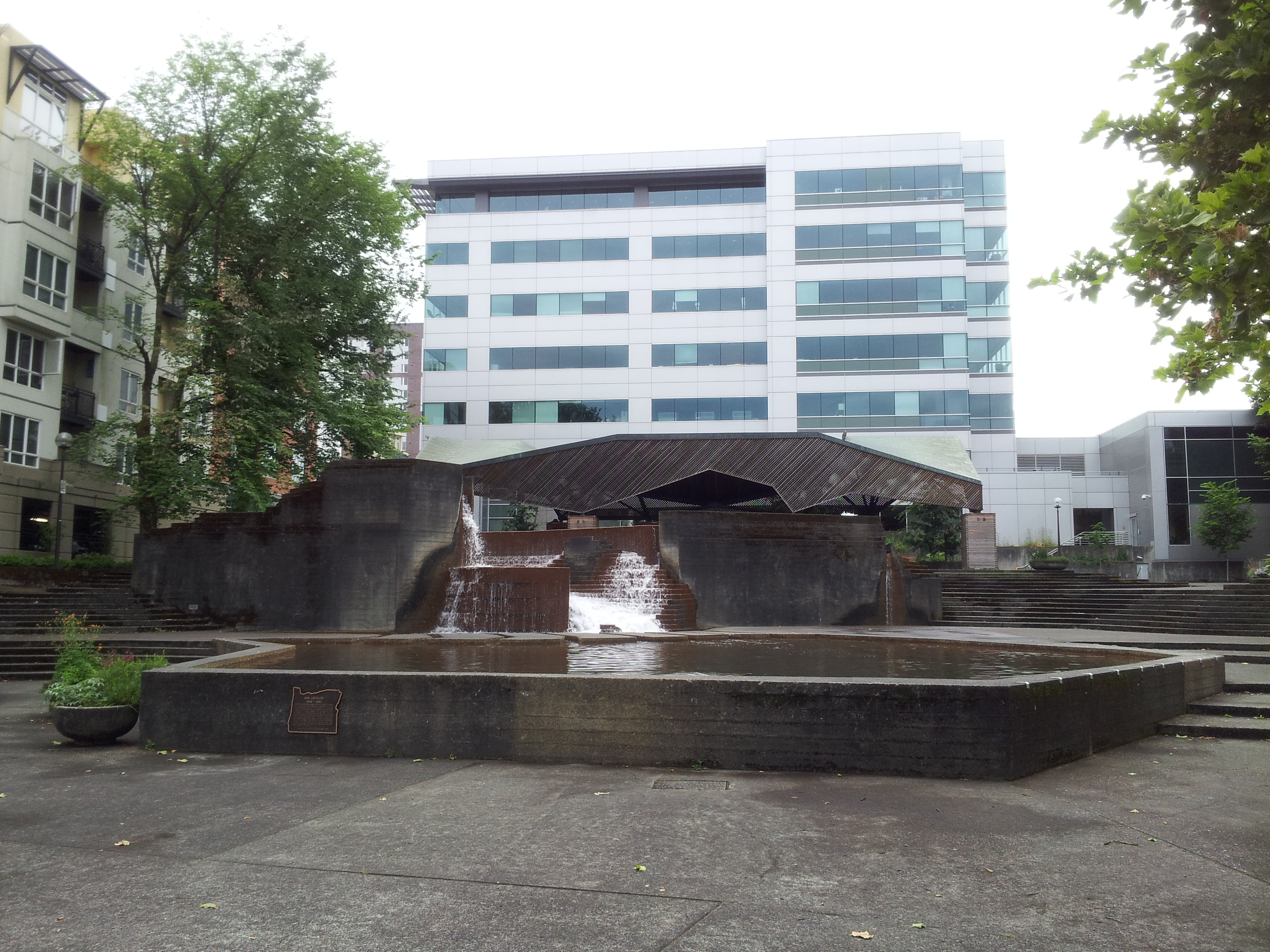
- The fountain and park in 2015
- Interactive map of Lovejoy Fountain Park
- Type: Urban park
- Location: SW 3rd Avenue and Harrison Street; Portland, Oregon
- Coordinates: 45.509318°N 122.67974°W
- Area: 1.11 acres (0.45 ha)
- Created: 1966
- Operator: Portland Parks & Recreation
- Status: Open 5 a.m. to midnight daily

Lovejoy Fountain Park (or Lovejoy Plaza) is a city park in downtown Portland, Oregon, U.S.

== Description and history ==
Completed in 1966, the park was designed by American landscape architect Lawrence Halprin. The park was the first in a series of fountains and open space designed by Halprin in the South Auditorium District urban renewal area. The stark concrete contours of the park are bounded by tree-lined pedestrian malls that connect to other parks, including Keller Fountain Park. The park is named in honor of Asa Lovejoy, one of the first landowners of the Portland town site. The Portland Penny, which was used by Lovejoy and Pettygrove to determine the name of the city, was used to determine the name of Lovejoy and Pettygrove Parks.

In addition to the fountain, the park also features a large copper-clad pavilion designed by Halprin's collaborator, American architect Charles Willard Moore.

Shortly after opening, Life Magazine published a three-page pictorial Mid-City Mountain Stream which described the park as a "piece of wilderness transplanted—wet and dry, glittering and static—which effectively invites wading and clambering and contemplation."

The Halprin Landscape Conservancy was formed in 2001 to "spruce up and protect Lovejoy Plaza, Ira Keller Fountain, and Pettygrove Park, an ensemble considered to be one of Mr. Halprin's masterpieces."

== See also ==
- Fountains in Portland, Oregon
- List of parks in Portland, Oregon
