= Manuel Izquierdo =

Spanish-born American sculptor (1925–2009)

Manuel Izquierdo (1925 – July 17, 2009) was a sculptor and woodcut artist. He is best known for his abstract, organic welded-metal sculptural forms and his sturdy woodcut prints.

Izquierdo was born Manuel Izquierdo Torres in Madrid, Spain, in 1925, the son of a bricklayer. He and his siblings fled Spain in 1936, spending some years in France and finally moving to the United States in 1942 through the help of the American Friends Service Committee, settling in Portland, Oregon. After graduating from the Museum Art School (now known as the Pacific Northwest College of Art) under sculptor Frederic Littman in 1951, Izquierdo taught there for the next 46 years. His work was shown throughout the northwestern United States, as well as in a collection at the Metropolitan Museum of Art in New York City.

He received the Oregon Governor's Arts Award in 1991. He died on July 17, 2009, in Portland.

== Works ==
- The Dreamer (1979), Portland, Oregon
- Silver Dawn (1980), Portland, Oregon
- Eye of Orion (1981), Portland, Oregon
- Unfolding Rhythms (1987), Portland, Oregon
