= Royal Rosarians =

Greeters at the Portland Rose Festival

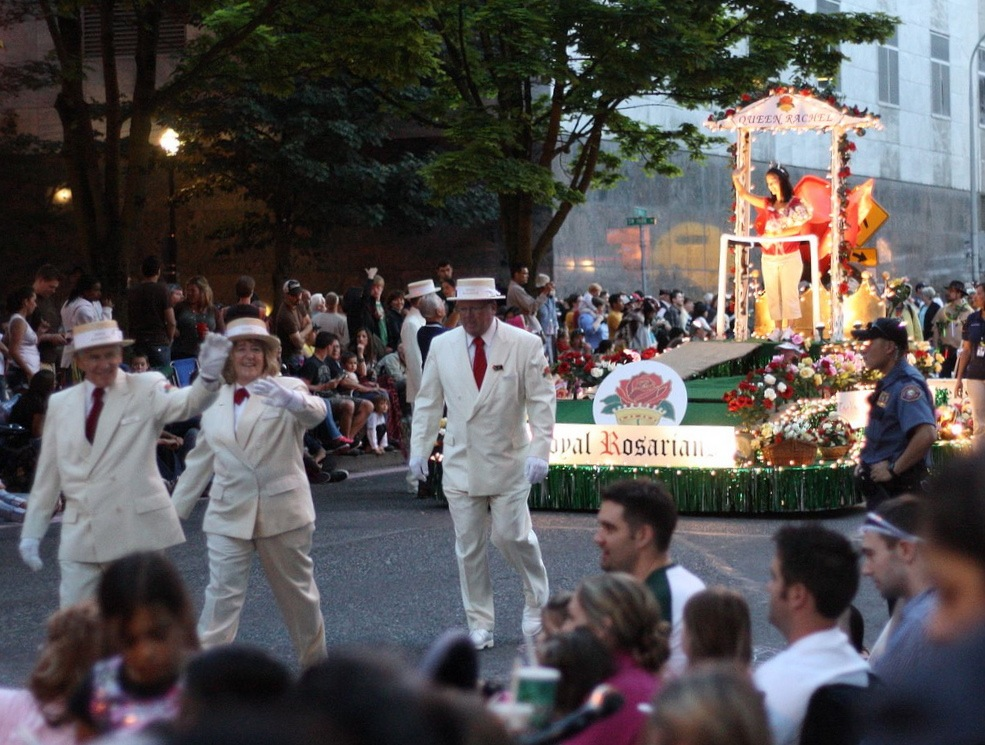
- Rosarians march in the 2010 Starlight Parade in front of the official float with Queen Rachel Seeman
- Formation: 1912
- Founded at: Portland, Oregon
- Type: Civic organization Ambassadors
- Purpose: Civic engagement
- Prime Minister: Ron Fisher - 2026
- Queen of Rosaria: Ava Rathi
- Website: www.royalrosarians.com

The Royal Rosarians are the "official greeters and ambassadors of goodwill" of Portland, Oregon. The group was founded in 1912.

Its members are most visible during the Portland Rose Festival or at events at the International Rose Test Garden, Washington Park, and the Peninsula Park Rose Garden. Additionally, members, along with the elected Queen of Rosaria, travel to various events and festivals throughout the world. The group also welcomes visiting dignitaries at the Portland International Airport and Union Station.

The Rosarian's motto is "For You a Rose in Portland Grows".

== History ==
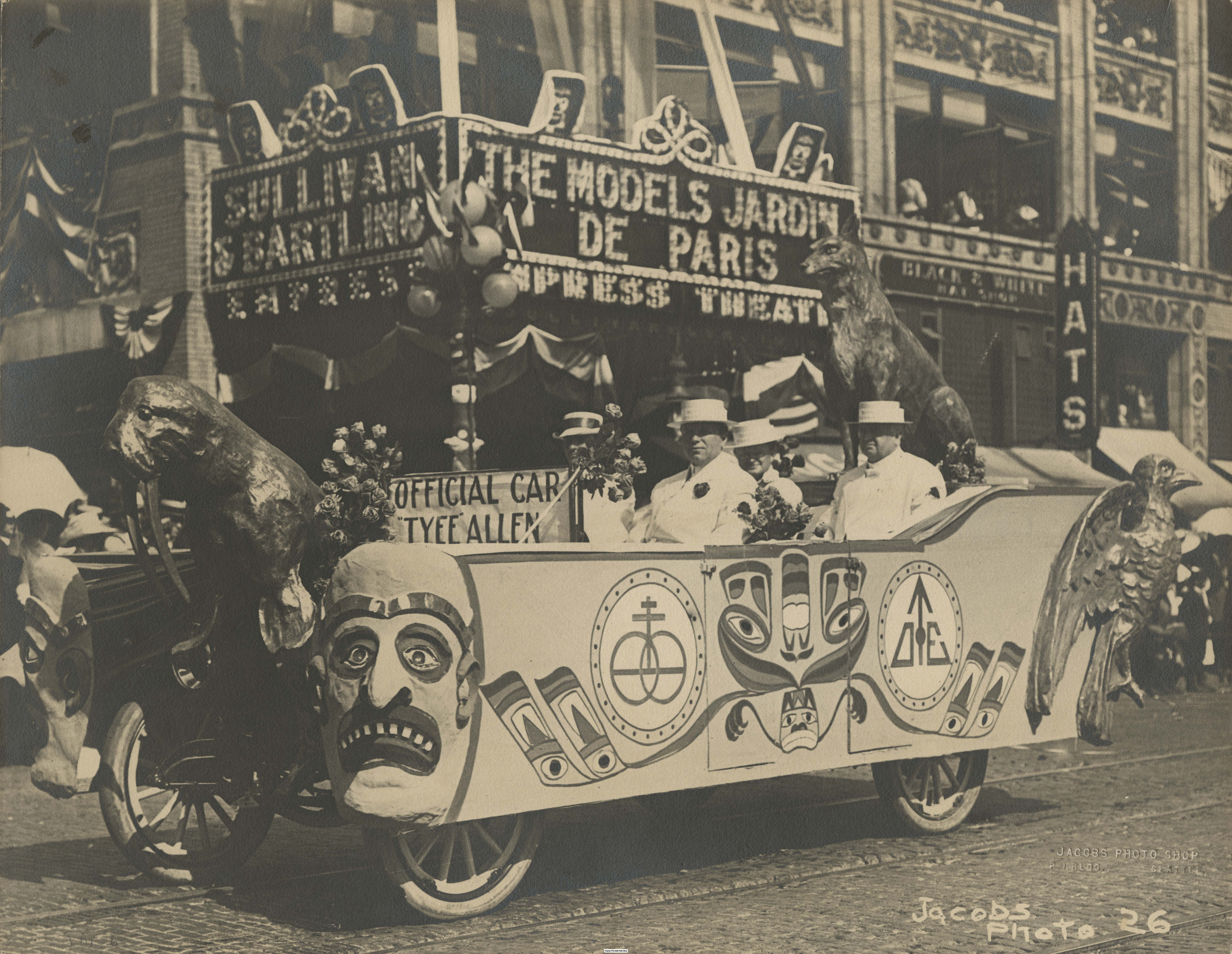
Royal Rosarians in 1912, just after their founding, in the Seattle Golden Potlatch Parade

In 1911, ten Portland businessmen served as representatives of Portland at Seattle's Golden Potlatch Festival. On the train home, the men decided to create an official group to serve as ambassadors of Portland, and specifically its Rose Festival. Around 100 men initially joined and made their first appearance at the 1912 festival.

The Rosarians are highly based on English royal tradition.

In 1989, the Rosarians inducted their first three female members.

== Uniforms ==
The Rosarians are known for their all-white wool suits and straw hats, which they tip to welcome visitors.

The Prime Minister and other high officials wear a cape in addition to the standard uniform.

== Queen and Court ==
Every year since 1908, a group of up to 15 high school girls from the metro area are chosen in march based on various scholastic and civic achievements. Beginning the first week of May, they travel full-time 5 days a week for 5 weeks, visiting community events, business leaders, hospitals, senior living centers, youth organizations and civic groups. All of the young women receive a $3,500 scholarship (valid at any college or trade school) as well as a complete wardrobe provided by local real estate company the Randall Group.

A panel of judges selects one of these girls to be the Queen of Rosaria based on "leadership and scholarship achievement, school activities, civic involvement, volunteer service, communication skills, and overall impression." The queen serves for one year, travelling with Rosarians to various events throughout the world. The names of each years Queens is engraved into an in-ground bronze plaque along the Queen's Walk in the International Rose Test Garden. A coronation for the queen is held during the Rose Festival at Oregon Square.

=== List of Queens ===
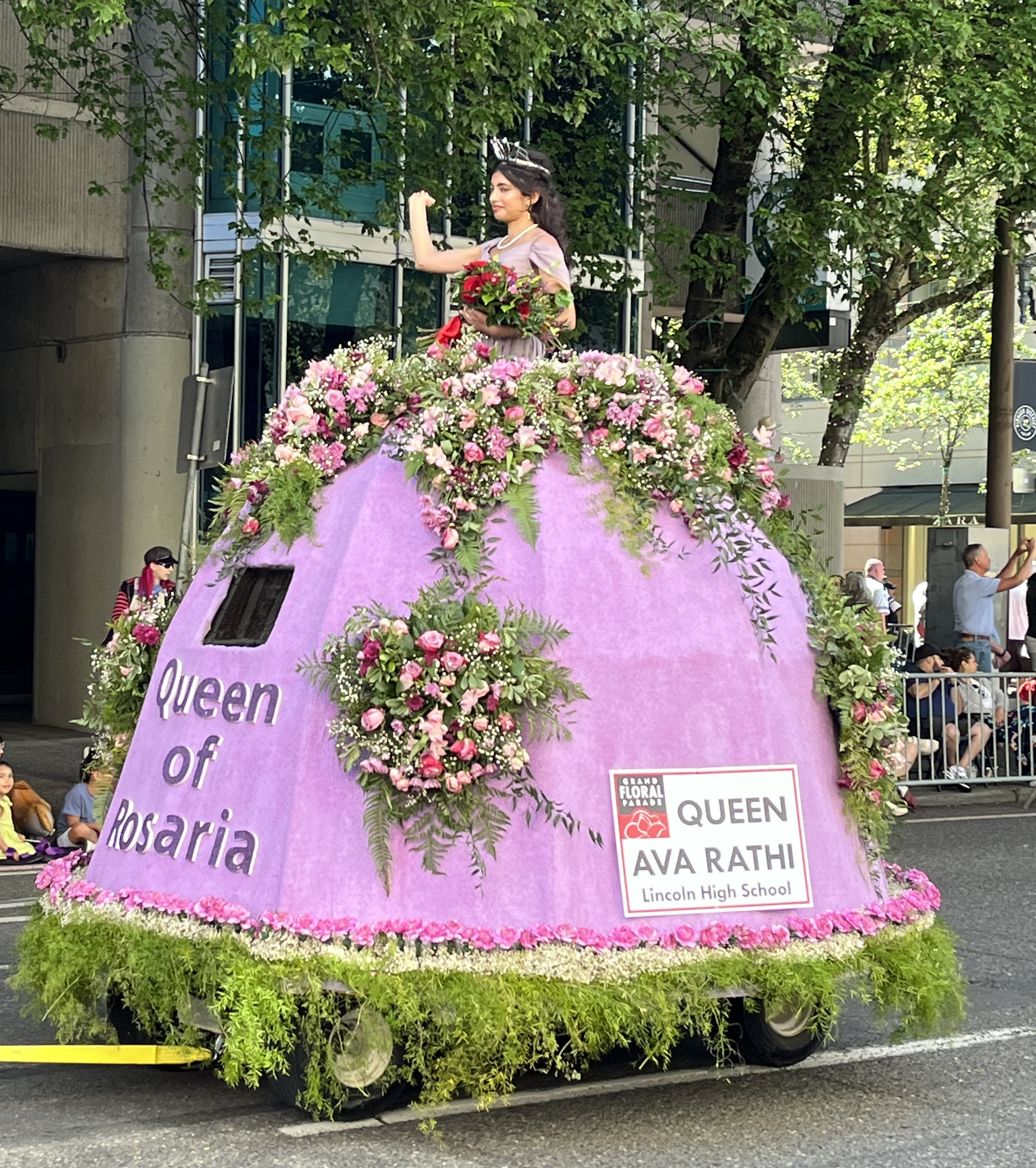
Ava Rathi, 2025

The following is a list of all Rose Festival Queens:

- Carrie Lee Chamberlain (1908)
- Thelma Hollingsworth (1914)
- Sybil Baker (1915)
- Muriel Saling (1916)
- Nina Keets (1917)
- Clara Fleischman (1919)
- Claire Squires (1920)
- Dorothy Metschan (1921)
- Harriet Griffith (1922)
- Lucy Lee Thomas (1923)
- Edith Daily (1924)
- Suzanne Honeyman (1925)
- Dorothy Mielke (1927)
- Elise Bristol (1928)
- Lenore Tamiesie (1929)
- Caroline Hahn - Lincoln (1930)
- Rachel Atkinson - Lincoln (1931)
- Frances Kanzler - Washington (1932)
- Jean Stevenson - Jefferson (1933)
- Beth Skinner - Franklin (1934)
- Irene Hegeberg - Jefferson (1935)
- Janet Sooysmith - Lincoln (1936)
- Dorothy Hardin - US Grant (1937)
- Frances Hulse - US Grant (1938)
- Jean Hoover - Washington (1939)
- Virginia Rothenberg - Jefferson (1940)
- Betty Jane Harding - Girls Polytechnic (1941)
- Shirley Fowler - Franklin (1942)
- Shirley Howard - Commerce (1943)
- Jo Anne Bush - US Grant (1944)
- Joan Williams - Washington (1945)
- Lloyde Hough - Lincoln (1946)
- Georgene Ormston - Girls Polytechnic (1947)
- Barbara Logue - Washington (1948)
- Joyce Sommerlade - US Grant (1949)
- Dorothy Anderle - Cleveland (1950)
- Gloria Krieger - Jefferson (1951)
- Jeanne Wallace - Washington (1952)
- Nancie Williams - Lincoln (1953)
- Jan Markstaller - Washington (1954)
- Nancy Wyly - Jefferson (1955)
- Sharon Frey - US Grant (1956)
- Alice Eastman - Lincoln (1957)
- Ruth Parrett - US Grant (1958)
- Mary Sue Woolfolk - Jefferson (1959)
- Jean Ann Jackson - Lincoln (1960)
- Linda Fuqua - Cleveland (1961)
- Cherie Lynne Viggers - Wilson (1962)
- Linda Jean Jackson - US Grant (1963)
- Sharon Arneson (1964)
- Sally Swift - Roosevelt (1965)
- Julia Ann West - US Grant (1966)
- Ana Maria Enriquez - Jefferson (1967)
- Margaret Mary Huelskamp (1968)
- Rhonda Anderson - Marshall (1969)
- Laurie King - Wilson (1970)
- Kristi Lee - Roosevelt (1971)
- Mary Matney - Madison (1972)
- Anne Du Fresne - Lincoln (1973)
- Danita Ruzic - Madison (1974)
- Heather Van Wessem - Jackson (1975)
- Diana Fredericks - Cleveland (1976)
- Sue Higgins - Cleveland (1977)
- Tina Klassy - Franklin (1978)
- Rochelle Anderson - Marshall (1979)
- Robin Marks - Lincoln (1980)
- Kim DiPietro - St. Mary's (1981)
- Leslie Carlson - Cleveland (1982)
- Kira Rembold - Lincoln (1983)
- Stephanie Dir - Central Catholic (1984)
- Raina Beavers - Franklin (1985)
- Claudia Reimer - St. Mary's (1986)
- Rene Pearson - Cleveland (1987)
- Kelly Manning - Wilson (1988)
- Deanna Connell - St. Mary's (1989)
- Erin Neill - Cleveland (1990)
- Jennifer Deas - Wilson (1991)
- Malia Yoshida - Wilson (1992)
- Mikylah Myers - Cleveland (1993)
- Joy Lawrence - Lincoln (1994)
- Larisa Pennington - Lincoln (1995)
- Kristin Waldram - St. Mary's (1996)
- Adrian Williams - Lincoln (1997)
- Alisha Moreland - Jefferson (1998)
- Amber Starks - Cleveland (1999)
- Amy Seely - Wilson (2000)
- Wesley Grout - Lincoln (2001)
- Leela Joshi - Wilson (2002)
- Priscilla Isaacs - Franklin (2003)
- Tara Beatty - Wilson (2004)
- Katelyn Callaghan - Central Catholic (2005)
- Grace Neal - Cleveland (2006)
- Elizabeth Larson - Lincoln (2007)
- Marshawna Williams - Cleveland (2008)
- Rachel Seeman - US Grant (2009)
- Victoria Dinu - US Grant (2010)
- Lamarra Haynes - Franklin (2011)
- Kate Sinnott - Central Catholic (2012)
- Hannah Rice - Madison (2013)
- Emma Waibel - West Linn (2014)
- Kahedja Burley - Jefferson (2015)
- Grace Ramstad - Centennial (2016)
- Michaela Canete - Century (2017)
- Kiara Johnson - Parkrose (2018)
- Mya Brazile - St. Mary's (2019)
- Anya Anand - Lincoln (2020)
- Lili Rosebrook - Valley Catholic (2021)
- Senya Scott - Ida B. Wells (2022)
- Déja Fitzwater - Tigard (2023)
- Kobi Flowers - Jefferson (2024)
- Ava Rathi - Lincoln (2025)

== Gallery ==
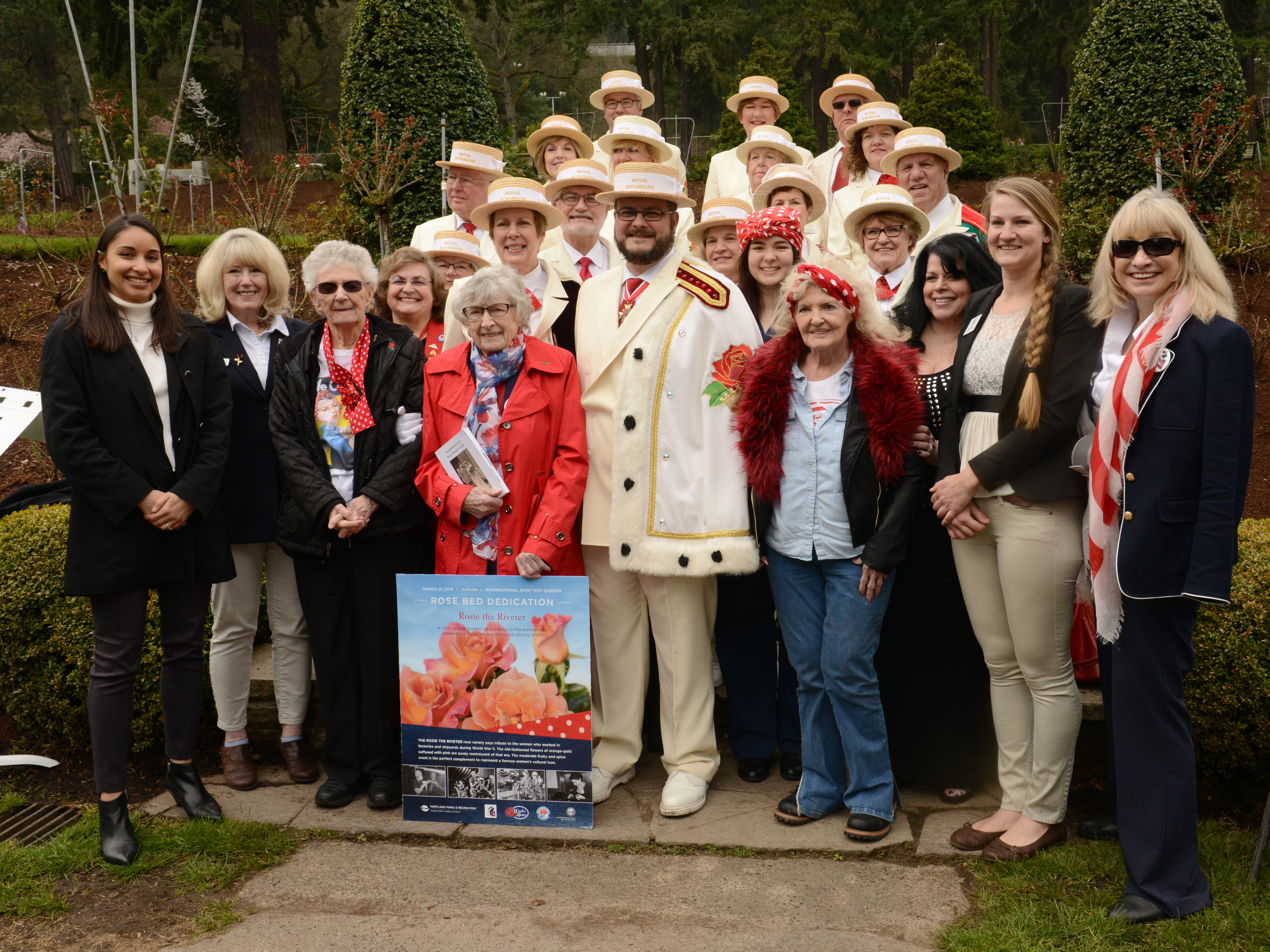
Rosarians celebrating Rosie the Riveter Day

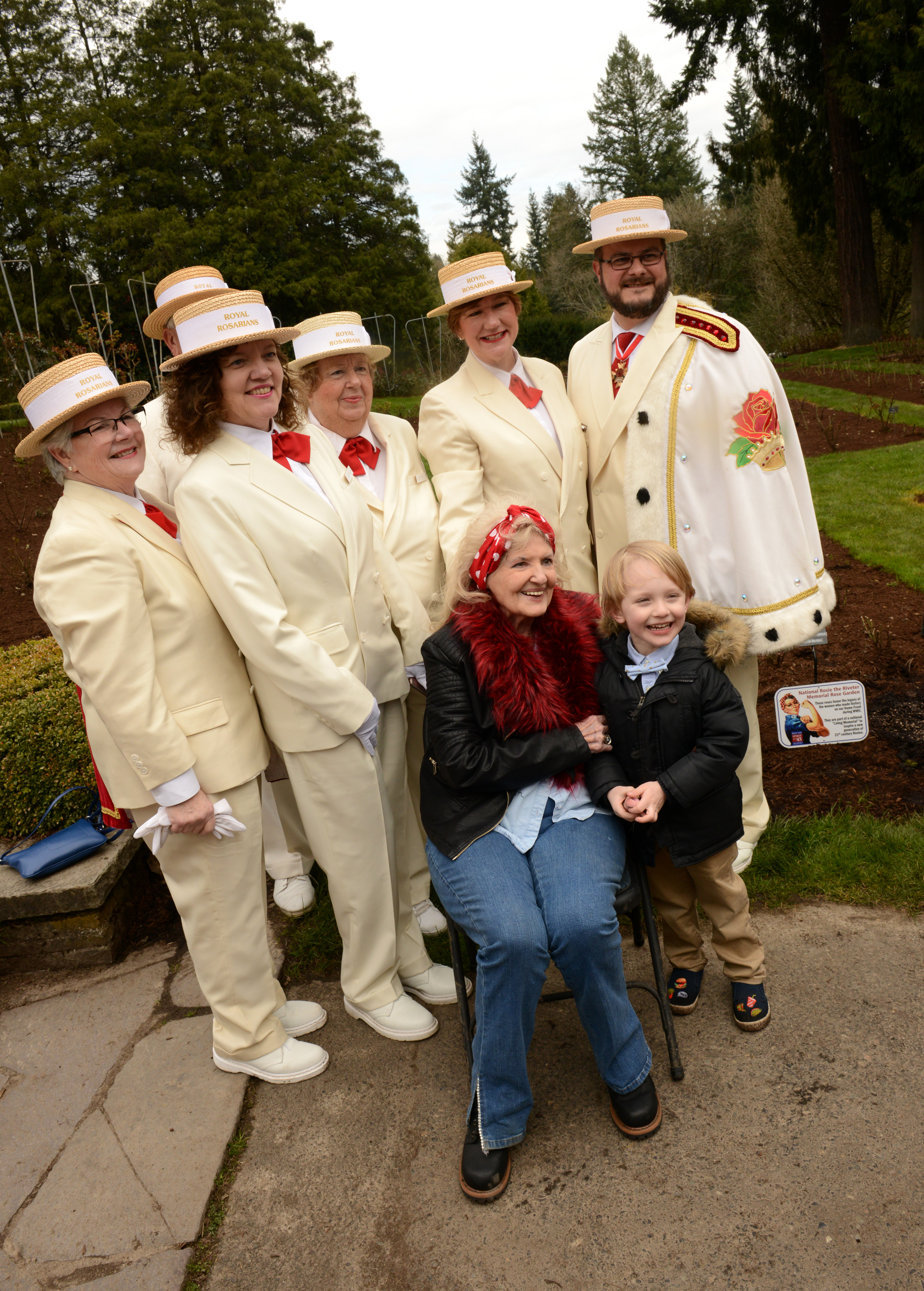
Female World War II veteran Ada Wyn Parker poses for a photo with a group of Rosarians

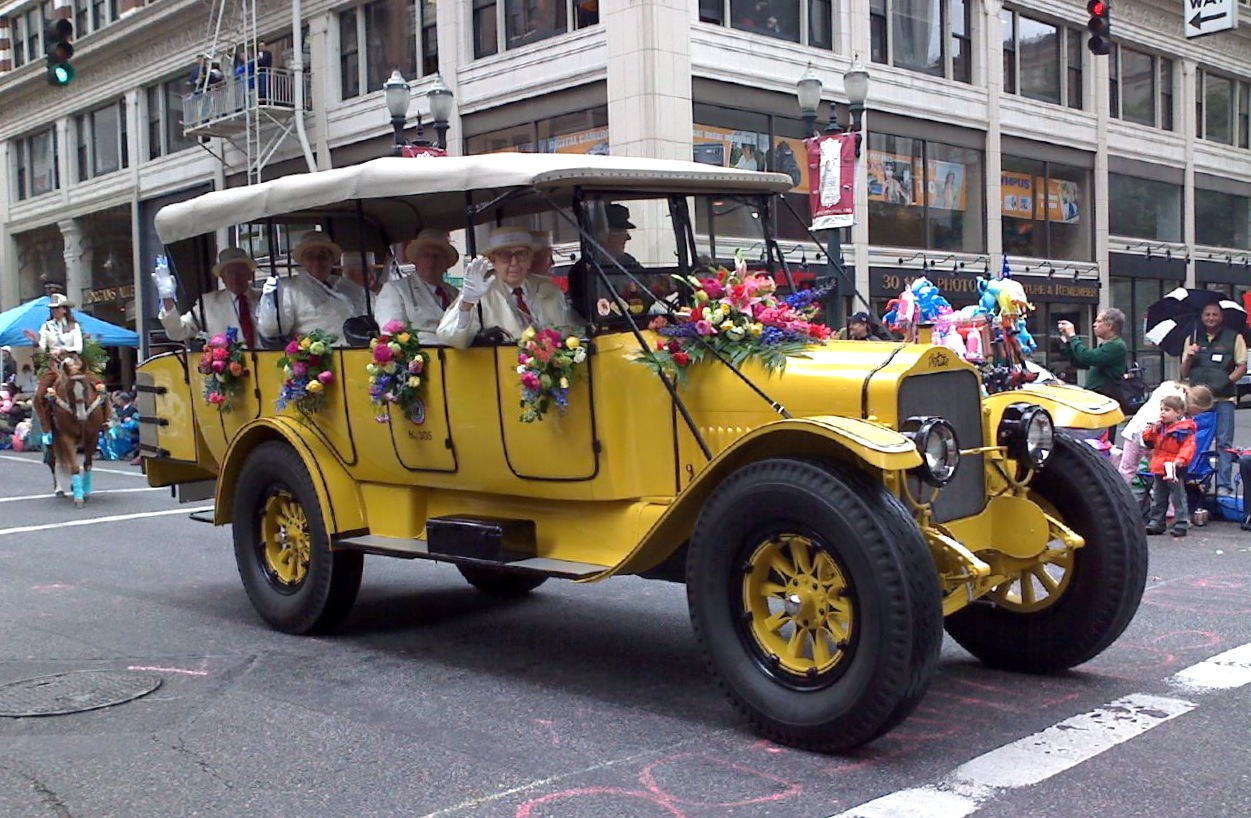
Rosarians in the 2008 Starlight Parade

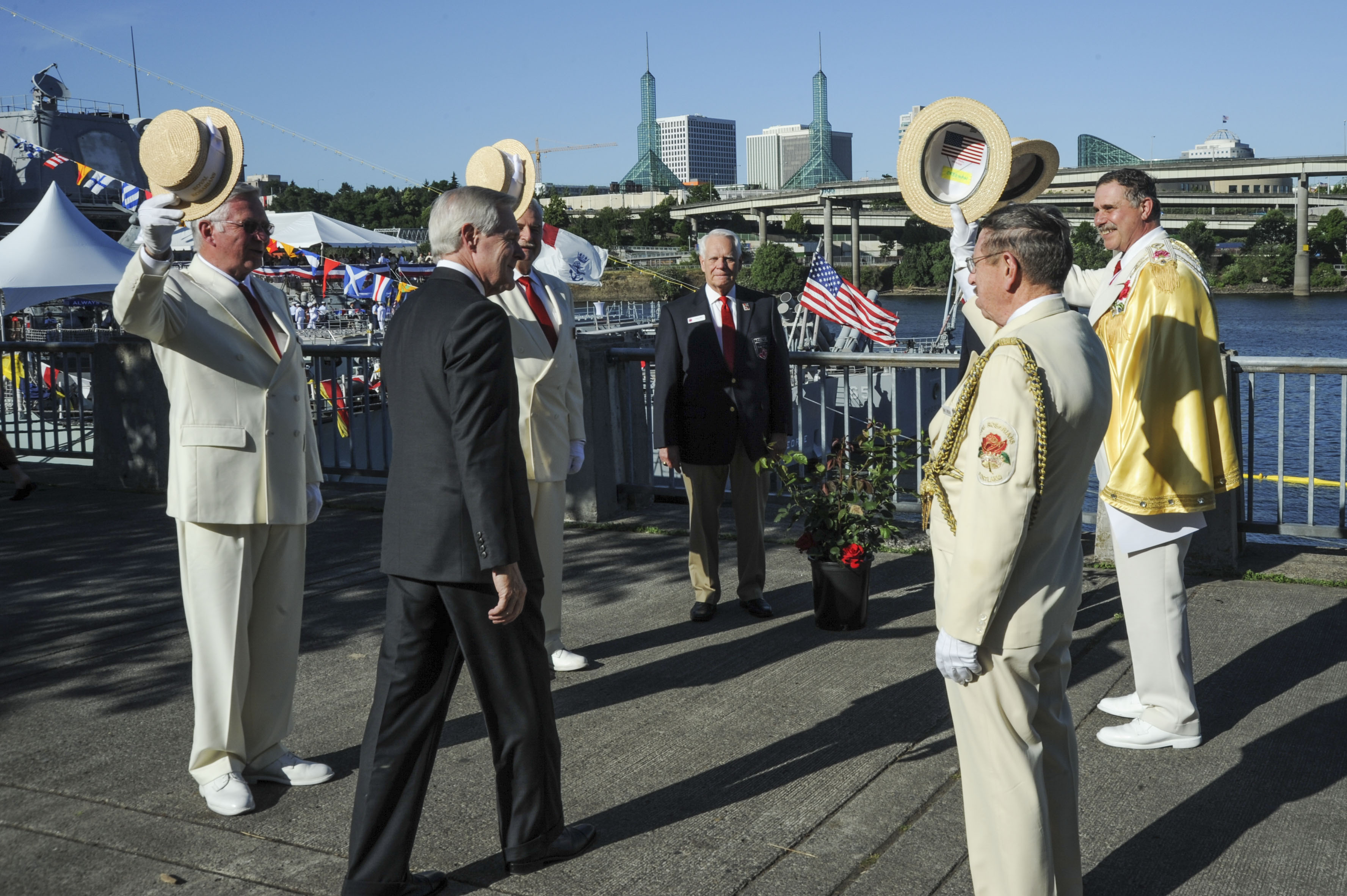
Rosarians tipping their hat to Navy Secretary and former Governor of Mississippi Ray Mabus

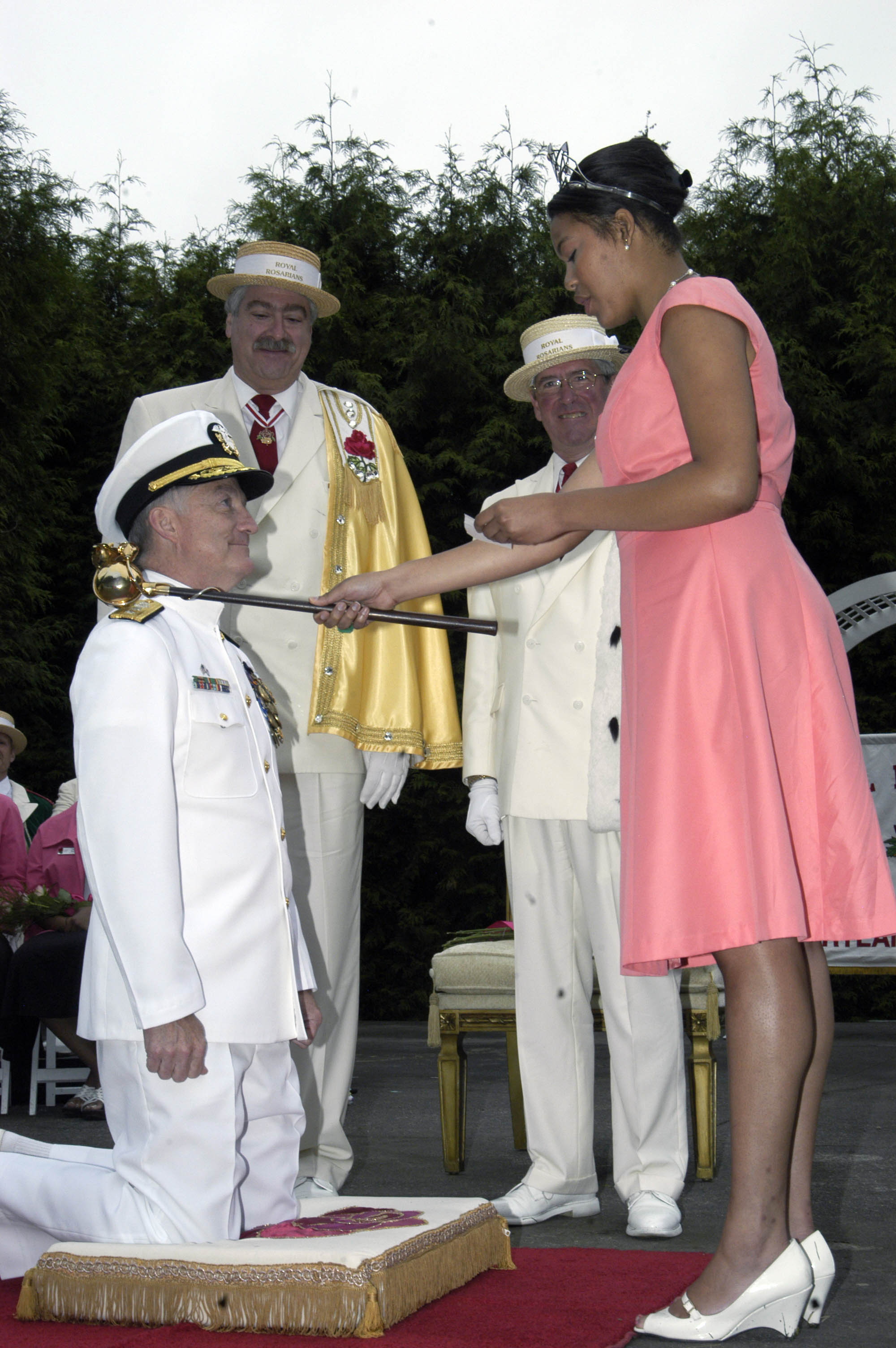
Rear Admiral James Kelly is knighted by Queen Marshawna Williams in 2009

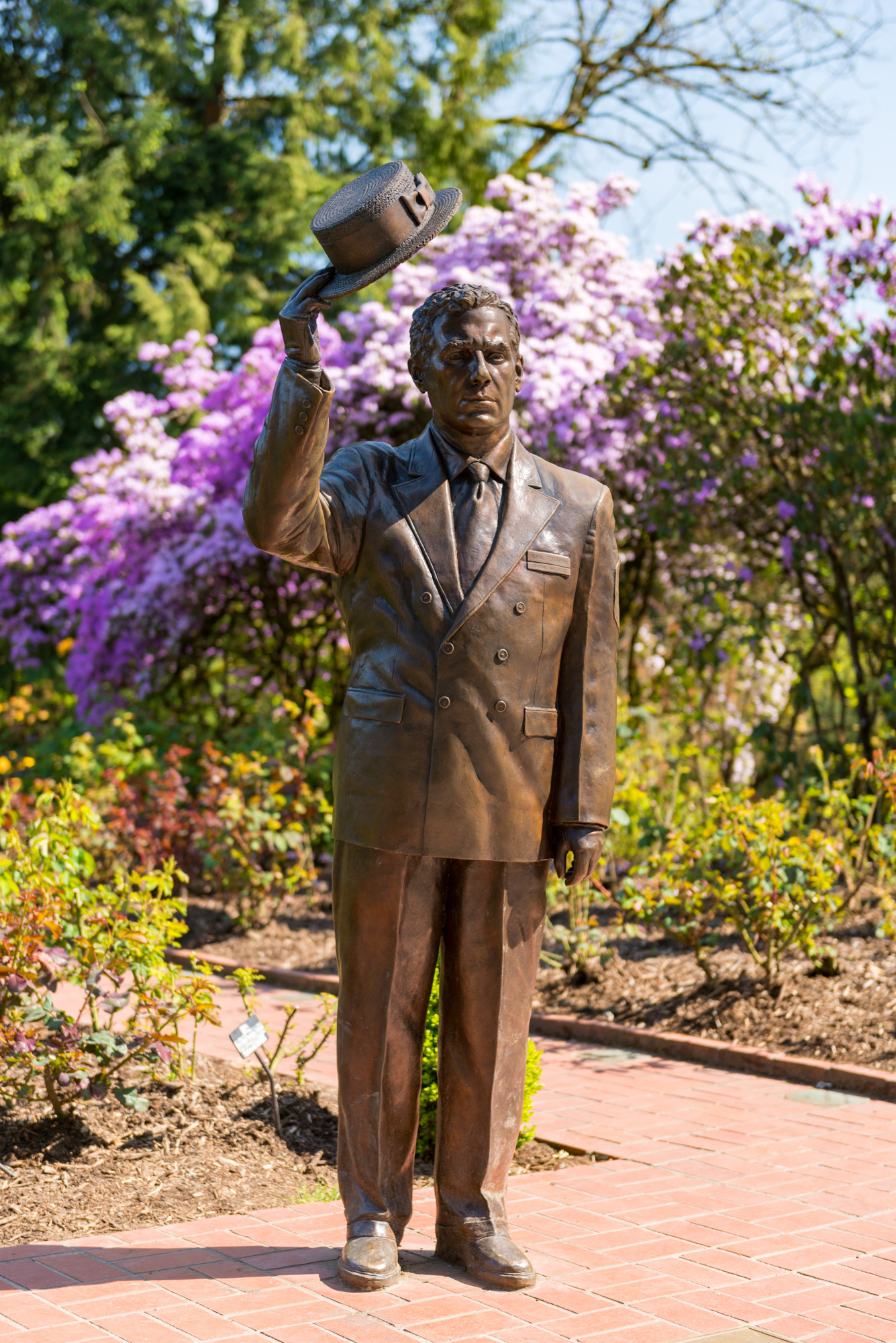
Royal Rosarian, a statue depicting a Rosarian tipping his hat

== See also ==
- Roses in Portland, Oregon
- Royal Rosarian (2011)
