= Dawson Park =

Dawson Park may refer to:

- Dawson Park (Broughty Ferry), a sports field in Broughty Ferry, Dundee, Scotland
- Dawson Park (Portland, Oregon), a park in northeast Portland, Oregon, United States
