= Southeast Portland, Oregon =

Sextant in Portland, Oregon

Southeast
- Sextant
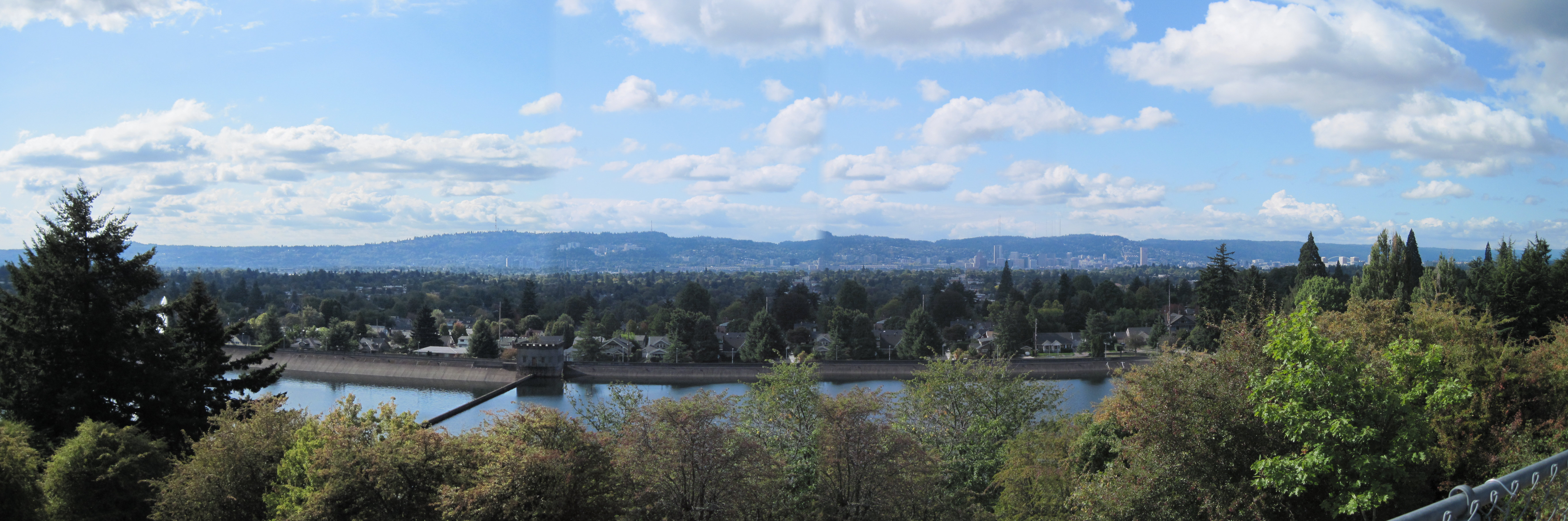
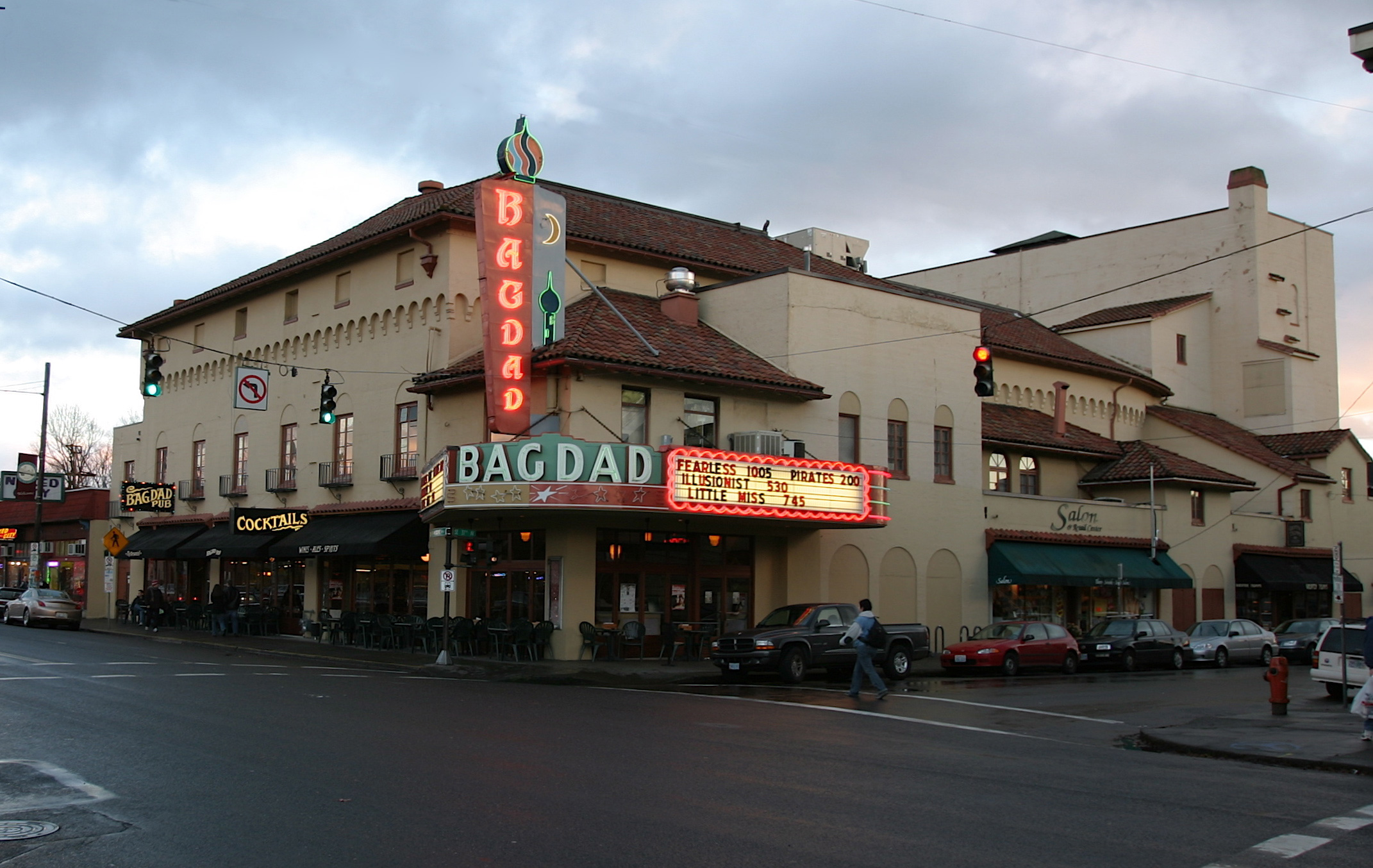
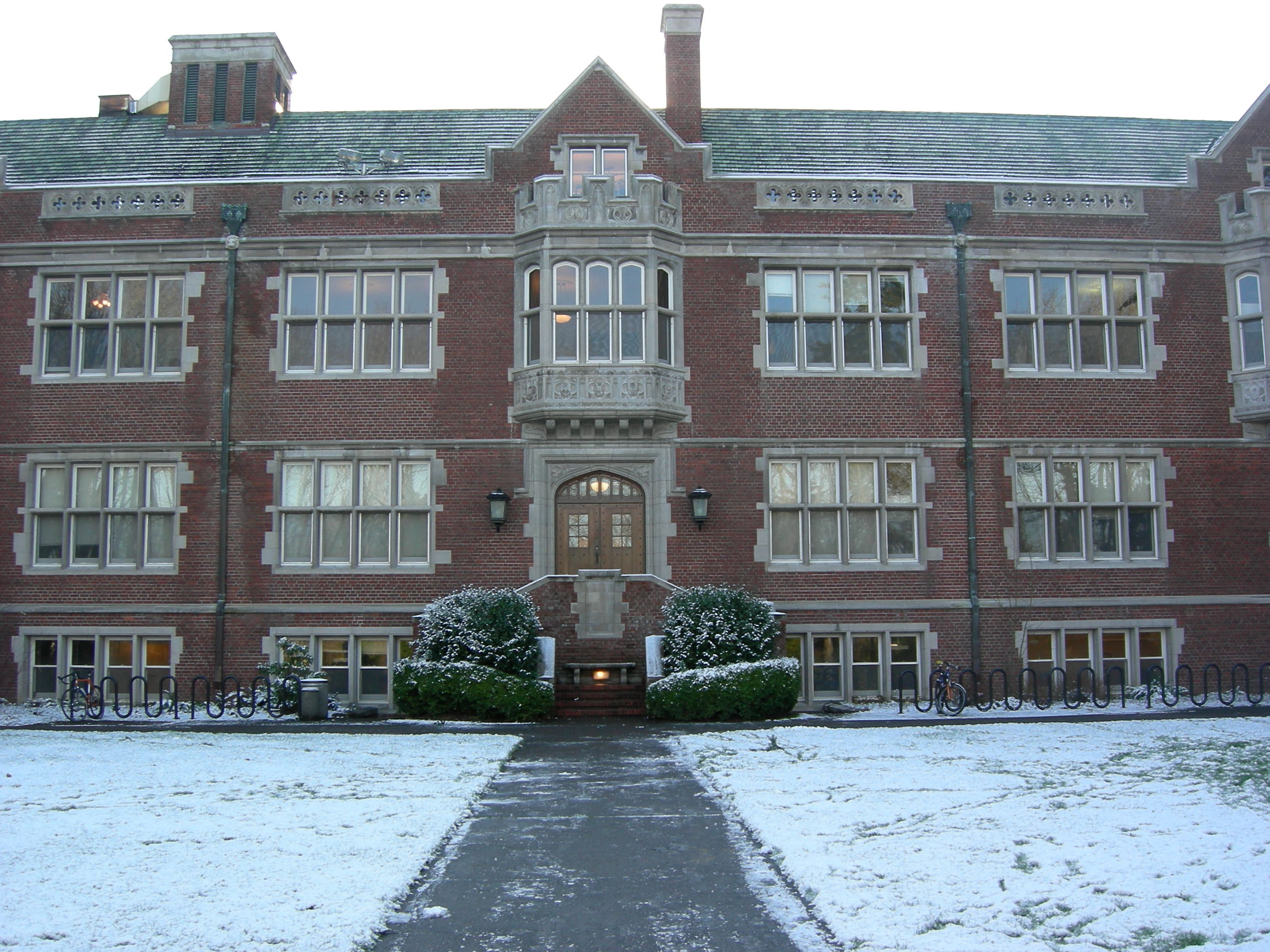
- From top: View from the top of Mount Tabor, Bagdad Theatre, and Eliot Hall at Reed College.
- Interactive map of Southeast
- Coordinates: 45.501855°N 122.612782°W
- Country: United States
- State: Oregon
- County: Multnomah County
- City: Portland

Government
  - Type: Sextant
- Area codes: 503, 971

Southeast Portland is one of the sextants of Portland, Oregon.

Parts of Southeast Portland are contained in Portland City Council Districts 1, 3, and 4.

== Boundaries and features ==
Southeast Portland is delimited by Burnside Avenue to the north and the Willamette River to the west. Southeast Portland stretches from the warehouses along the Willamette River through historic Ladd's Addition to the Hawthorne and Belmont districts out to Gresham. Not far from Hawthorne is Reed College, whose campus expands from Woodstock Boulevard to Steele Street, and from 28th Avenue to Campesinos Boulevard.

Other neighborhoods in Southeast Portland include Brentwood-Darlington, Foster-Powell, and Mt. Scott-Arleta.

Southeast Portland also features Mt. Tabor, a cinder cone volcano that has become one of Portland's more scenic and popular parks.

Peacock Lane is a street known locally for lavish Christmas decorations and displays.

== History ==
Southeast Portland has blue-collar roots and has evolved to encompass a wide mix of backgrounds. The Hawthorne district in particular is known for its hippie/radical crowd and small subculturally oriented shops.

Between the 1920s and the 1960s, Southeast was home to Lambert Gardens.

== See also ==
- National Register of Historic Places listings in Southeast Portland, Oregon
- Neighborhoods of Portland, Oregon
