= Roses in Portland, Oregon =

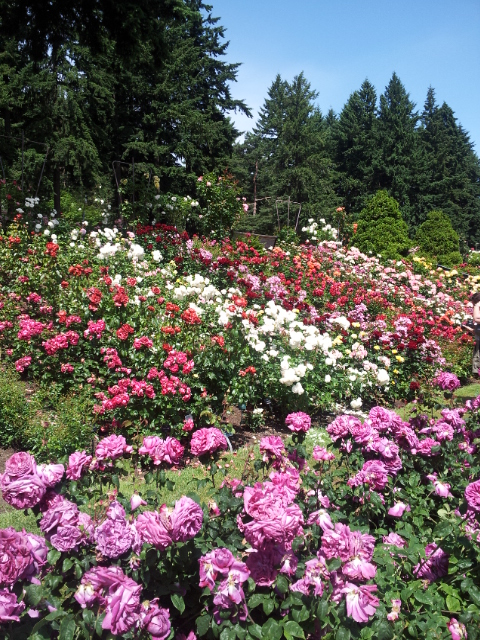
The International Rose Test Garden in 2013

The city of Portland, Oregon is ideal for growing roses outdoors due to its location within the marine west coast climate region, its warm, dry summers and rainy but mild winters, and its heavy clay soils. Portland has been known as the City of Roses, or Rose City, since the late 19th or early 20th century, after Madame Caroline Testout, a large pink variety of hybrid tea rose bred in France, was introduced to the city. Thousands of rose bushes were planted, eventually lining 200 miles (320 km) of Portland's streets in preparation for the Lewis and Clark Centennial Exposition in 1905.

The Rose City Park neighborhood in northeast Portland was formed in 1907, the same year of the first annual Portland Rose Festival. During World War I, nursery owners in Portland began planning a large rose garden to protect European rose varieties from the war. The garden was established in Washington Park as the International Rose Test Garden in 1917. Today, the Portland Rose Festival takes place each June with a carnival, parades, and navy ships docked along the Tom McCall Waterfront Park to promote the city. The International Rose Test Garden is currently one of the oldest public rose test gardens in the United States, covering 4.5 acres (1.8 ha) with over 8,000 rose plants, and more than 550 different varieties. In 2003, Portland adopted the "City of Roses" as its official nickname.

== History ==
In 1888, Georgiana Burton Pittock, the wife of Oregon newspaper publisher and business tycoon Henry Pittock, invited friends and neighbors to display their roses in a tent set up in her garden in the area now known as Pittock Block. In 1889, lawyer and civic leader Frederick Van Voorhies Holman helped found the Portland Rose Society. The rose cultivar Mme. Caroline Testout, a hybrid tea rose variety named after a French dressmaker, was introduced by French rosarian Joseph Pernet-Ducher in 1890. The cultivar gained popularity, and by 1905 Portland had 20 miles (32 km) of rose-bordered streets, with about half-a-million rose bushes planted, attracting visitors to the Lewis and Clark Centennial Exposition.

In 1915, rose hobbyist and Oregon Journal editor Jesse Currey convinced city officials to establish a rose test garden to protect hybrid roses grown in Europe during World War I. Portland's Park Bureau approved the idea in 1917, allowing rose enthusiasts in England to send roses to Portland for preservation. City landscape architect Florence Holmes Gerke began designing the International Rose Test Garden and accompanying amphitheatre in 1921. The garden was dedicated in June 1924 with Currey as the first curator. He served until his death in 1927. A stone bench in the garden honors Currey's work as founder.

== City of Roses ==
The official and most common nickname for Portland is the "City of Roses", or "Rose City". According to Charles Paul Keyser, Portland Parks Superintendent from 1917 to 1950, the first known reference to Portland as "The City of Roses" was made by visitors at an Episcopal Church convention in 1888. The city's first annual rose show was held the following year, and by 1904, the Portland Rose Society began sponsoring fiestas to accompany the shows. The nickname grew in popularity after the 1905 Lewis and Clark Centennial Exposition, when mayor Harry Lane suggested that the city needed a "festival of roses". The first Portland Rose Festival was held two years later and remains the city's major annual festival a century later. The Portland Rose Society, which offers educational programs on "rose culture" and advocates the use of roses in the landscape, remains in operation today.

In Portland, the nickname is often attributed to Leo Samuel, who founded the Oregon Life Insurance Company in 1906 (known today as Standard Insurance Company). Samuel grew roses outside his home and placed a pair of shears outside his garden, so people could snip a rose from his garden to take for themselves. On June 18, 2003, the city council unanimously approved a resolution adopting "the City of Roses" as the city's official nickname.

== Gardens ==
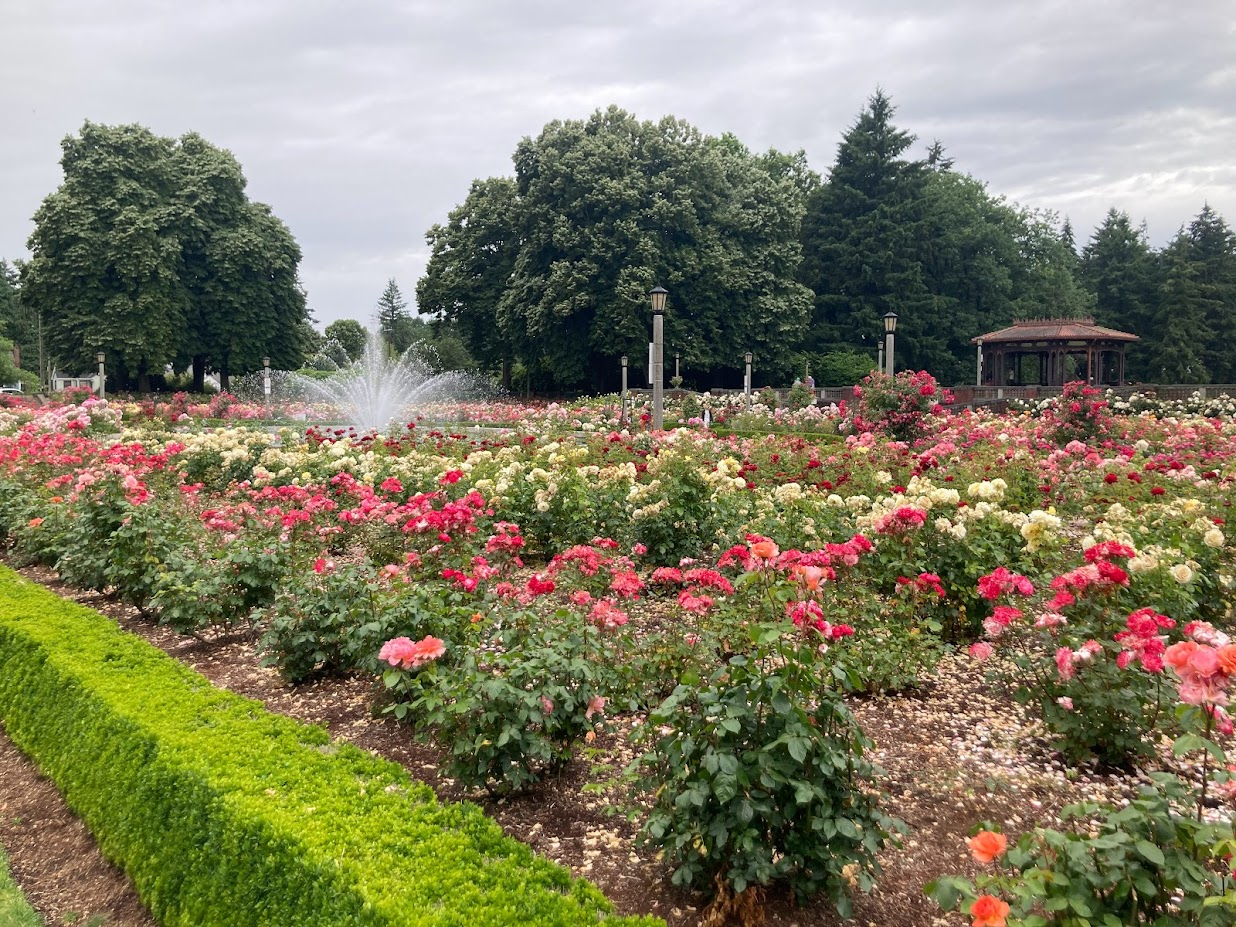
Peninsula Park, 2022

Many rose gardens are found throughout Portland, the most prominent of which is the International Rose Test Garden. Peninsula Park became the city's first public rose garden in 1909 when it was purchased for $60,000 ($2,150,000 in 2025) with funds raised in a 1908 bond measure. Designed by Emanuel L. Mische, the 2-acre (0.81 ha) garden contains 8,900 plantings featuring 65 rose varieties. Mme. Caroline Testout, the official rose of Portland, was grown at Peninsula Park. In 1913, the park was chosen as the location for an annual rose show, where it remained until Washington Park was selected as the location of the International Rose Test Garden in 1917. The park remains a popular Portland tourist destination, with more than 9,500 rose bushes representing over 600 varieties.

The Ladd's Addition neighborhood has four diamond-shaped rose gardens originally designed by William Sargent Ladd in the 1890s. Emanuel Mische designed landscaped areas in the park in 1909. Mische planted roses in the diamond gardens giving it a "stained glass effect". The park was acquired by Portland Parks & Recreation in 1981 and currently features 3,000 roses representing sixty varieties that were popular in the early 20th century.

== Events ==
The Portland Rose Festival is an annual civic festival held during the month of June. Events, including multiple parades, a carnival, fleet week, and the crowning of a queen, are organized by the volunteer non-profit Portland Rose Festival Association with the purpose of promoting the Portland region. Coinciding with the festival is the Annual Spring Rose Show, considered to be one of the largest and longest-running in the nation. The Portland's Best Rose event, sponsored by the Portland Rose Society, began in 1996. The competition includes 100 judges ranking varieties in a blind contest. One day prior to the competition, the public is invited to vote for the People's Choice award recipient.

== Local namesakes ==
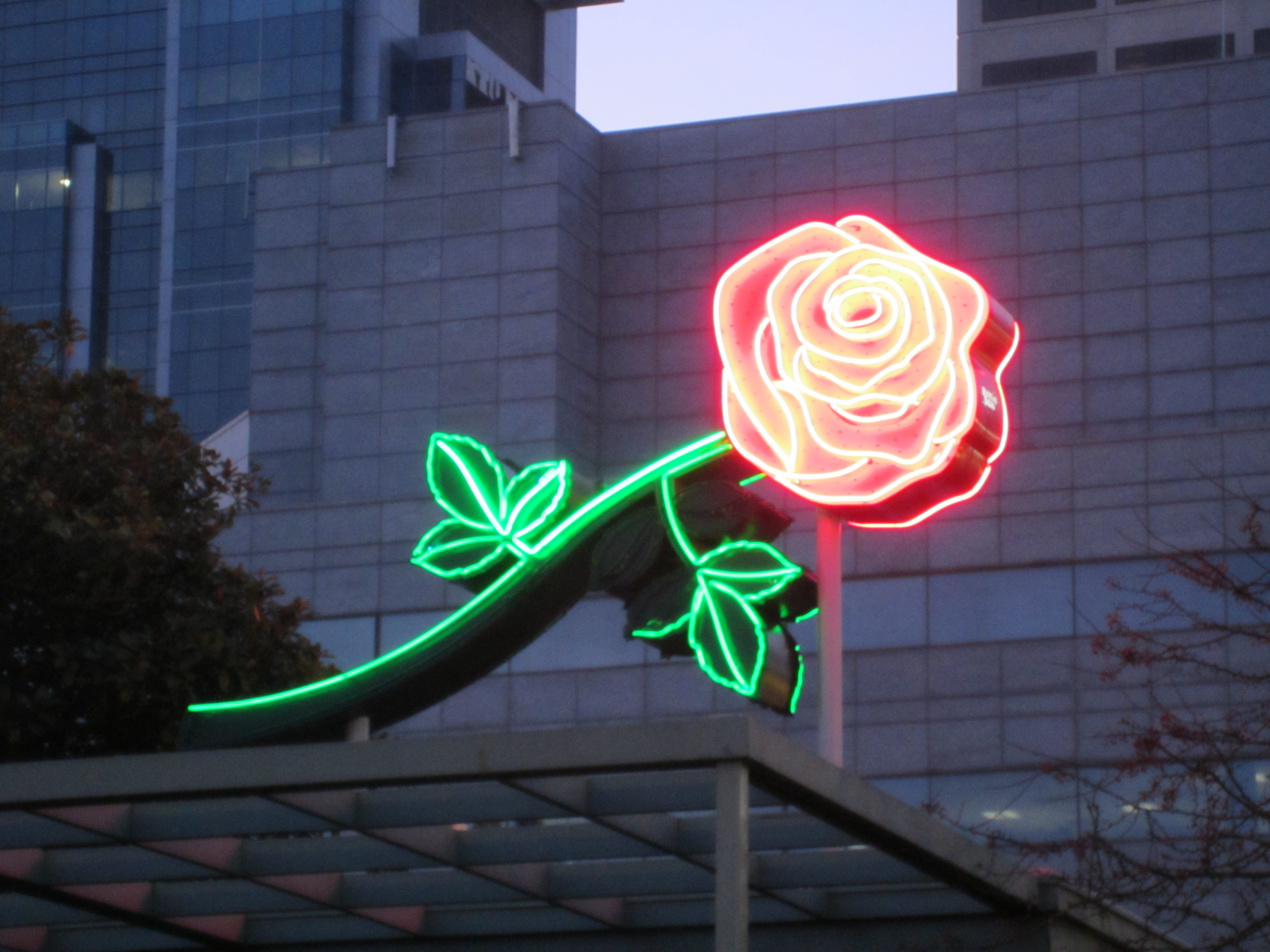
Neon rose sign at the Visitors Information Center.

Rose City Park is a neighborhood and park in northeast Portland. The neighborhood formed in 1907, the year of the first Portland Rose Festival. The headquarters of the rose festival are at the Visitors Information Center, also known as the Rose Building. The building was designed by architect John Yeon in 1948 and served as a chamber of commerce office and visitor center, city offices, and a restaurant, as well as the rose festival's headquarters. Located along Tom McCall Waterfront Park, it was added to the National Register of Historic Places in 2010 and features a rose garden and neon rose sign. Other namesakes include murals depicting roses painted on sides of buildings in Portland, and the private company Rose City Transit, which provided most mass transit service in Portland from 1956 to 1969.

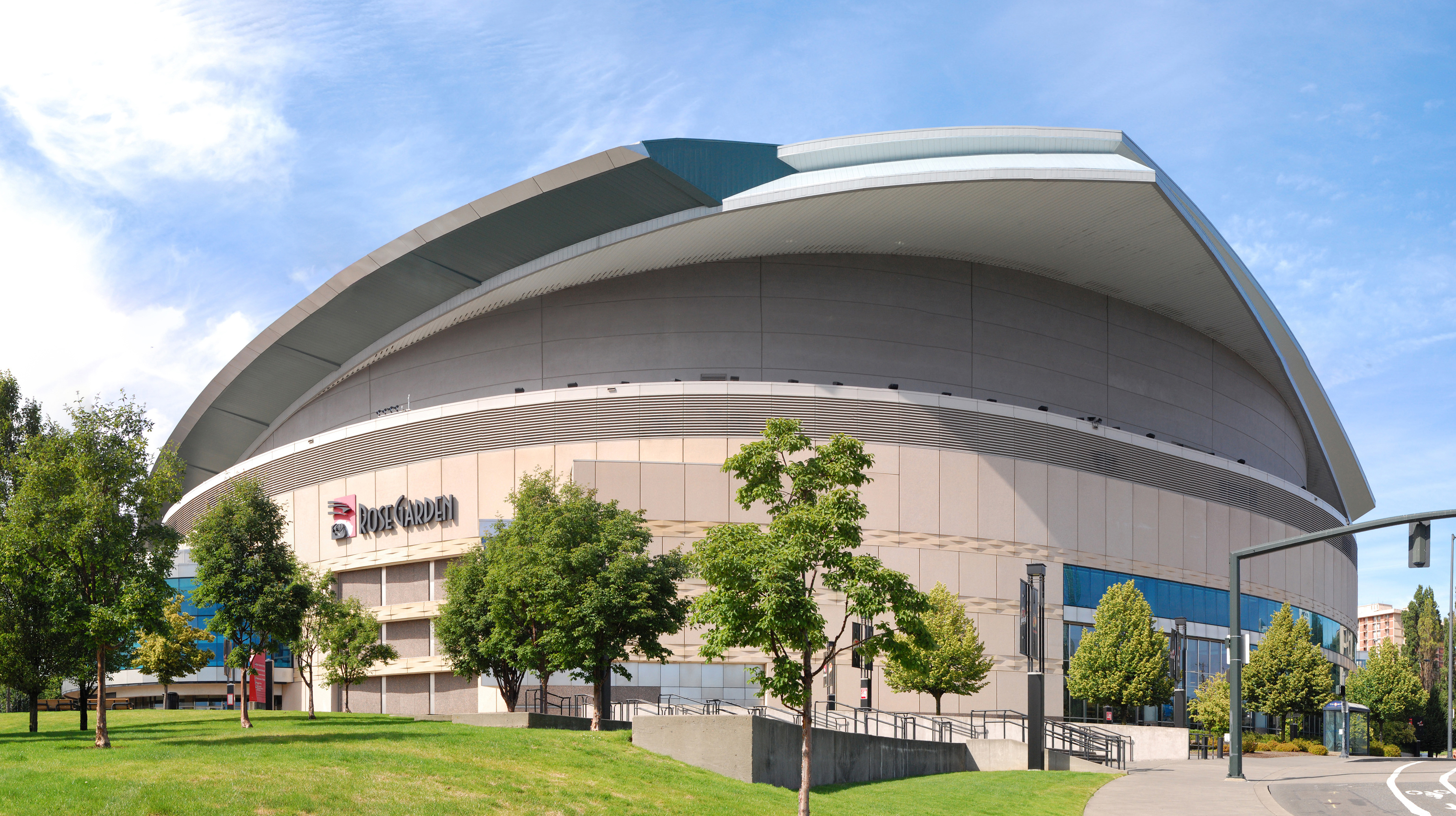
The Moda Center, formerly known as the Rose Garden, is home to the Portland Trail Blazers.

Roses have long been associated with sports in Portland. The Moda Center, known as the Rose Garden for many years, is an indoor sports arena in the Rose Quarter, a sports and entertainment center in the Lloyd District neighborhood. The venue was one of the last National Basketball Association (NBA) facilities to have its naming rights sold. In addition, three professional sports teams were named the Portland Rosebuds during the first half of the 20th century; they were two professional men's ice hockey teams that played home games at the Portland Ice Arena and one Negro league baseball team in the West Coast Baseball Association that was also known as the "Portland Roses". The first hockey team played in the Pacific Coast Hockey Association from 1914–1918. During the 1915–1916 season the Rosebuds became the first American team to participate in the Stanley Cup Final series. The second hockey team played in the Western Hockey League's fifth and final season (1925–1926). Other teams have incorporated the "Rose City" nickname into their brand. The Rose City Rollers, an all-female roller derby league within the Women's Flat Track Derby Association, was established in 2004 and supports four local teams and two traveling teams. The Rollers support a junior league known as the Rosebuds. Two women's professional football teams have been named the Rose City Wildcats, the first formed for the 2001 season of the Women's American Football League and the second for the 2011 season of the Women's Spring Football League. A women's soccer team named the Portland Thorns FC was formed in 2012 by the Portland Timbers and have played in the National Women's Soccer League since 2013.

== Music ==
Portland born recording artist Esperanza Spalding has a song called "City of Roses" on her album Radio Music Society.

== See also ==
- Cherry blossoms in Portland, Oregon
- Portland Japanese Garden, another garden within Washington Park
- Rose (mascot)
- Rose trial grounds
- Royal Rosarians
