= International Rose Test Garden =

Public park and rose garden in Portland, Oregon, United States

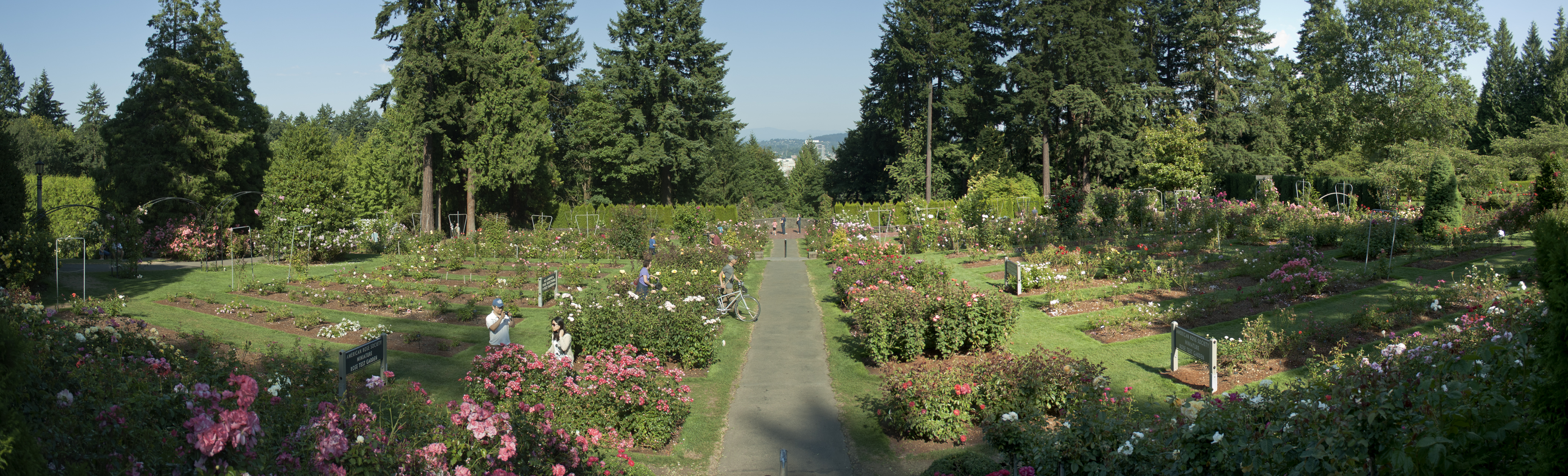
- A panoramic view of the International Rose Test Garden

- Location within Portland, Oregon Location within Oregon Location within the United States
- Type: Rose garden
- Location: 400 SW Kingston Ave. Portland, Oregon
- Coordinates: 45.5191°N 122.7054°W
- Area: 6.90 acres (2.79 ha)
- Opened: 1917
- Owner: City of Portland
- Operator: Portland Parks & Recreation
- Visitors: 700,000 (estimated)
- Plants: 10,000+
- Collections: Shakespeare Garden; Gold Medal Garden; Royal Rosarian Garden; Miniature Rose Garden
- Public transit: 63
- Website: Official website

The International Rose Test Garden is a rose garden in Washington Park in Portland, Oregon, United States. There are over 10,000 rose bushes of approximately 650 varieties. The roses bloom from April through October with the peak coming in June, depending on the weather. New rose cultivars are continually sent to the garden from many parts of the world and are evaluated on several characteristics, including disease resistance, bloom formation, color, and fragrance. It is the oldest continuously operating public rose test garden in the United States and exemplifies Portland's nickname, "City of Roses". The garden draws an estimated 700,000 visitors annually.

== History ==
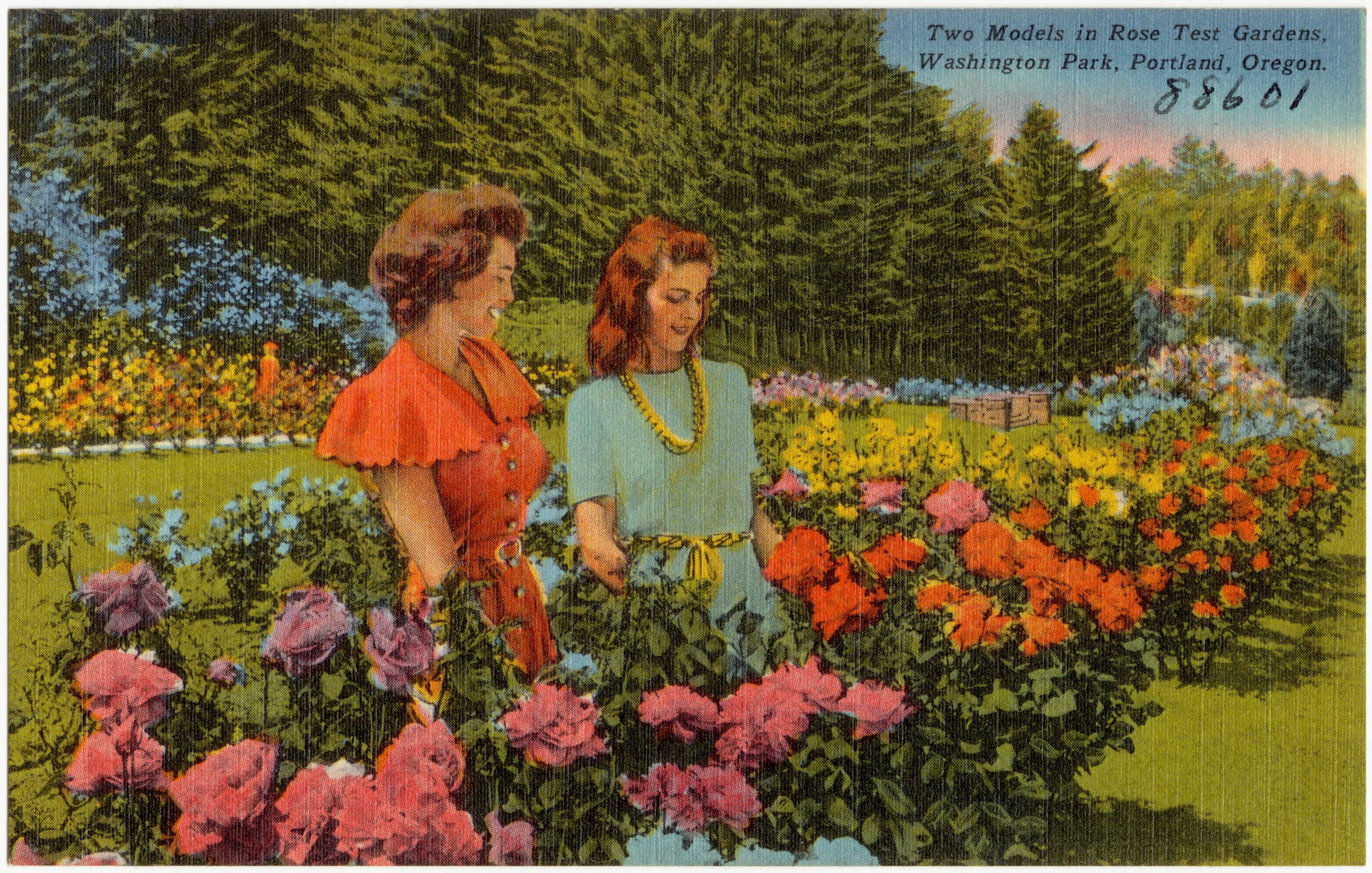
Vintage postcard of two women in the garden.

In 1915 Jesse A. Currey, president of Portland's Rose Society and Sunday editor of the Oregon Journal, convinced city officials to institute a rose test garden to serve as a safe haven during World War I for hybrid roses grown in Europe. Rose lovers feared that these unique plants would be destroyed in the bombings. The Park Bureau approved the idea in 1917 and by early 1918, hybridists from England began to send roses.

A decade before the test garden was proposed, 20 miles (32 km) of Portland's streets had been lined with rose bushes for the 1905 Lewis and Clark Centennial Exposition. Portland was already dubbed "The City of Roses" and the test garden was a way to solidify the city's reputation as a rose-growing center internationally.

In early 1918, the garden began receiving plants from growers in England and Ireland, as well as Los Angeles, Washington and the Eastern United States. In 1921 Florence Holmes Gerke, the landscape architect for the city of Portland, was charged with designing the International Rose Test Garden and the amphitheater. The garden was dedicated in June 1924. Currey was appointed as the garden's first rose curator and served in that capacity until his death in 1927. Since 1940, the rose garden has been one of the official testing gardens for what is now called the All-America Rose Selections.

Originally, the garden occupied about a block, sandwiched between a playground and an elk corral. A parking lot replaced the original rose garden when the garden moved to its current location in 1928. The garden later expanded in the 1950s when Washington Park's zoo moved to its current location.

The award called Portland's Best Rose was established in 1996. Rose experts from around the world attend a one-day judging in June and select the best rose that day from thousands of submissions. Portland remains the only North American city to issue such an award.

By 2013, the garden's collection had expanded to over 10,000 rose bushes of over 650 varieties.

== Features ==
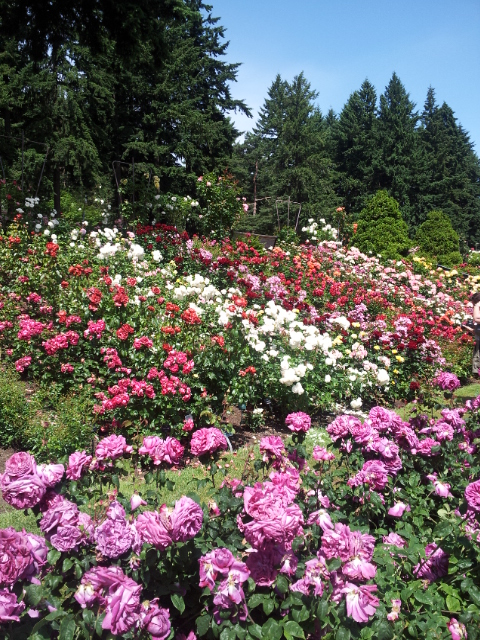
A view of one area of the gardens.

The International Rose Test Garden covers 4.5 acres (18,000 m^{2}) in several tiers facing downtown Portland, the Willamette River, and East Portland. On clear days, there are views of the Cascade Range, with Mount Hood featured prominently. The Queens Walk is a brick walkway at the base of the garden with bronze plaques featuring each Queen's hand written name and year, honoring each Rose Festival queen since 1907. The plaques originally were installed in Lambert Gardens near Reed College, but were moved to the International Rose Test Garden in the early 1950s.

The roses and other plantings are tended by three paid staffers and dozens of volunteers. The garden is one of eleven American Garden Rose Selections test sites in the United States. Rose breeders and distributors from across the world typically donate about 2,500 roses per year to the garden. Sometimes the garden gets roses a year or two before they're introduced to the market, but most of the roses in the garden are commercially available. The garden features an inventory that shows the names and locations for all of the roses.

The Rose Garden Store opened May 1, 2000. The store sells rose-themed books, merchandise, and garden supplies. The garden includes an amphitheater designed with the original garden. It hosts many events throughout the year, predominantly classical music concerts and a few plays. During good weather, the amphitheater is popular for picnicking and flying disc games. The Frank E. Beach Memorial Fountain (officially titled Water Sculpture) is an abstract stainless steel sculpture and fountain along the main promenade, designed and built by Oregon artist Lee Kelly and dedicated in 1975. The fountain honors Frank Edwin Beach (1853–1934), the man who is said to have christened Portland the "City of Roses" and who first proposed the annual Rose Festival. Royal Rosarian is a bronze statue depicting a Royal Rosarian tipping his hat. It was created by American artist Bill Bane and dedicated in 2011.

=== Gardens ===
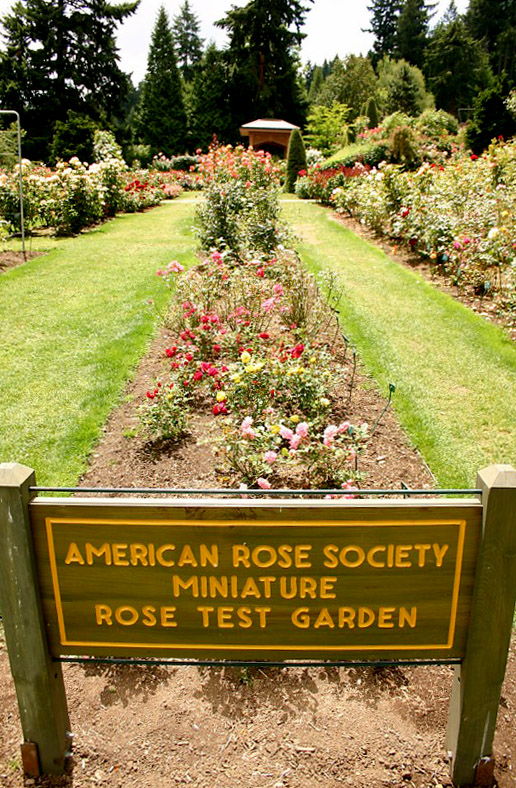
The American Rose Society's Miniature Rose Test Garden

The American Garden Rose Selection (AGRS) test garden covers two terraces of the Rose Garden. The roses testing in the garden are identified by number rather than by name; the plants are evaluated for two years by multiple criteria before being judged. The Gold Award Garden, dedicated in 1970, features award-winning roses from the AGRS Test Garden. The garden features a gazebo added in 1991, and a wall honoring past presidents of the Portland Rose Society. It is a popular site for weddings.

The Royal Rosarian Garden displays roses honoring past Prime Ministers of the Royal Rosarians, a civic group which serves as the official greeters and goodwill ambassadors for the City of Portland who serve in the many Rose Festival events, and features a stone bench honoring Jesse Currey. The Royal Rosarian Garden contains many roses that are no longer commercially available.

Established in 1975, the Miniature Rose Garden is a test ground to help determine what miniature roses will go to market. The Miniature Rose Garden is one of only eight such miniature rose testing grounds for the American Rose Society. The national annual American Rose Society winners are displayed in the middle of the garden along the center aisle.

The Shakespeare Garden was donated by the Shakespeare Society in 1943. It originally featured botanicals mentioned in the works of William Shakespeare. Over time, the Shakespeare Garden has evolved, planted with summer annuals, tropical plants, year-round shrubs, and roses. The rose varieties are named after characters in Shakespeare's plays. The Shakespeare Garden includes a formal walkway and a raised sitting area.

== Public access ==
Parking at the International Rose Test Garden costs $2 per hour, to a maximum of $8 per day. The rose garden is connected daily to downtown Portland by TriMet bus route 63-Washington Park, and to other destinations in the park, including MAX Light Rail, by the free Washington Park Shuttle.

== Gallery ==
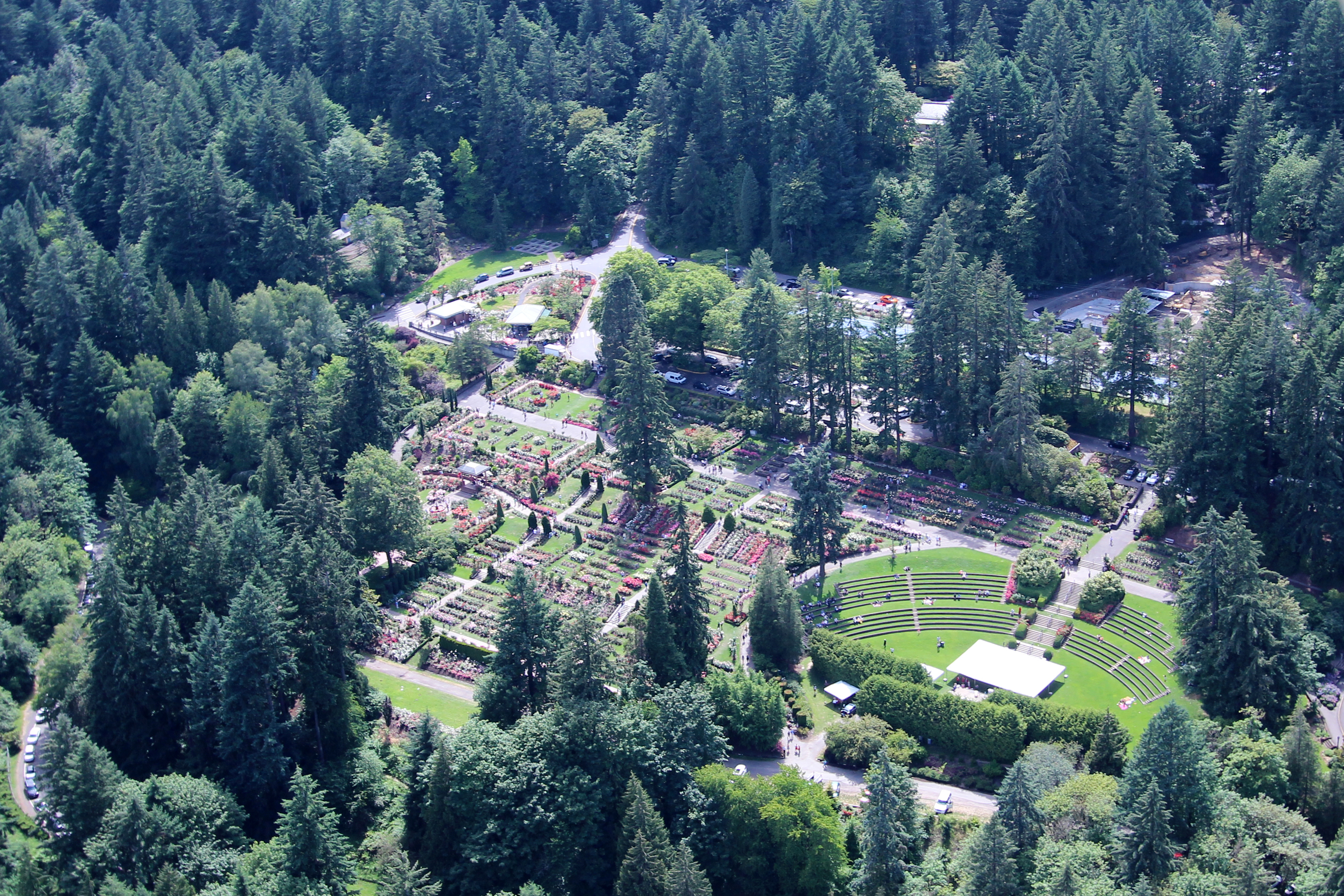
Aerial view.

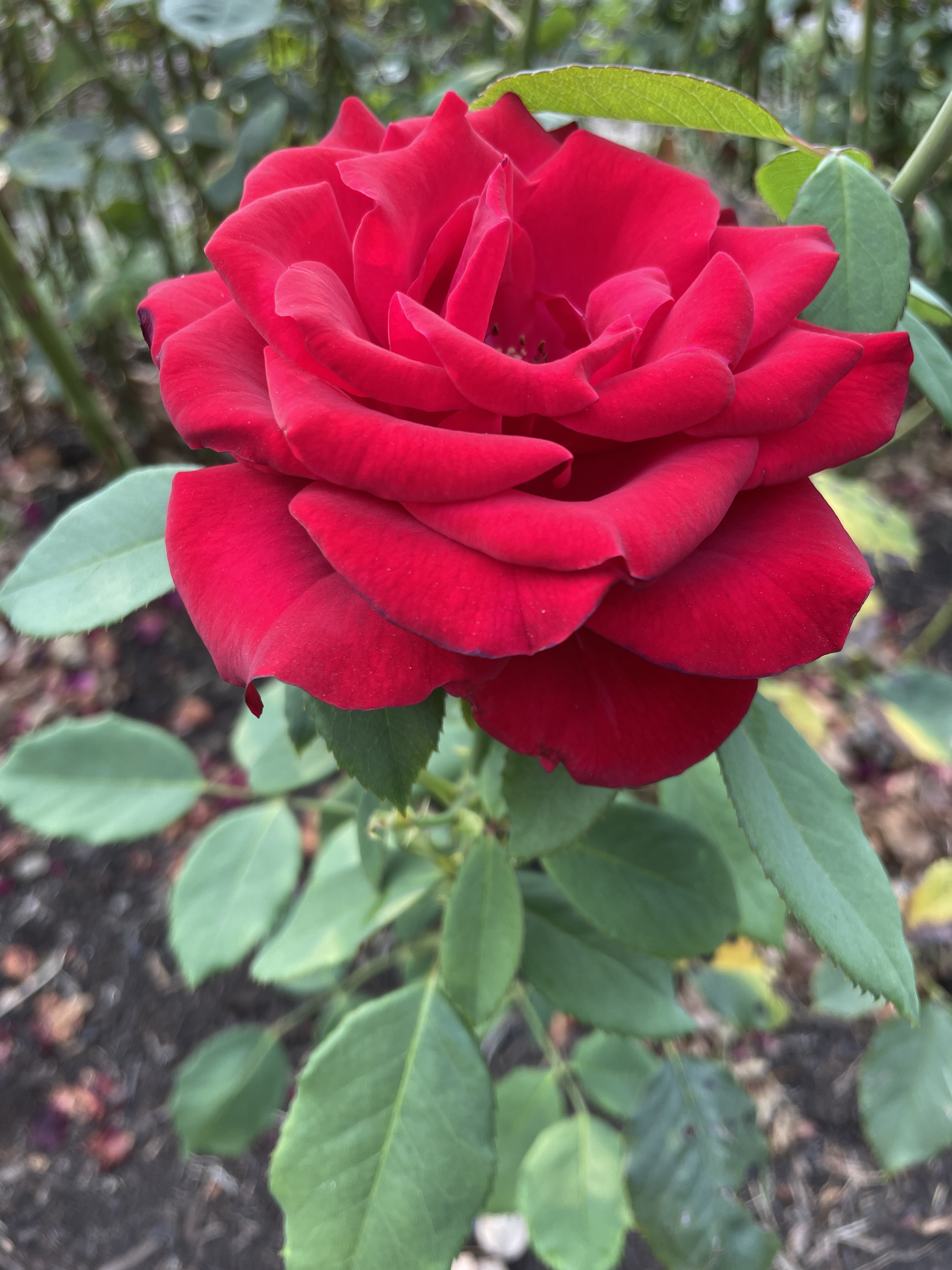
Close-up of a rose.

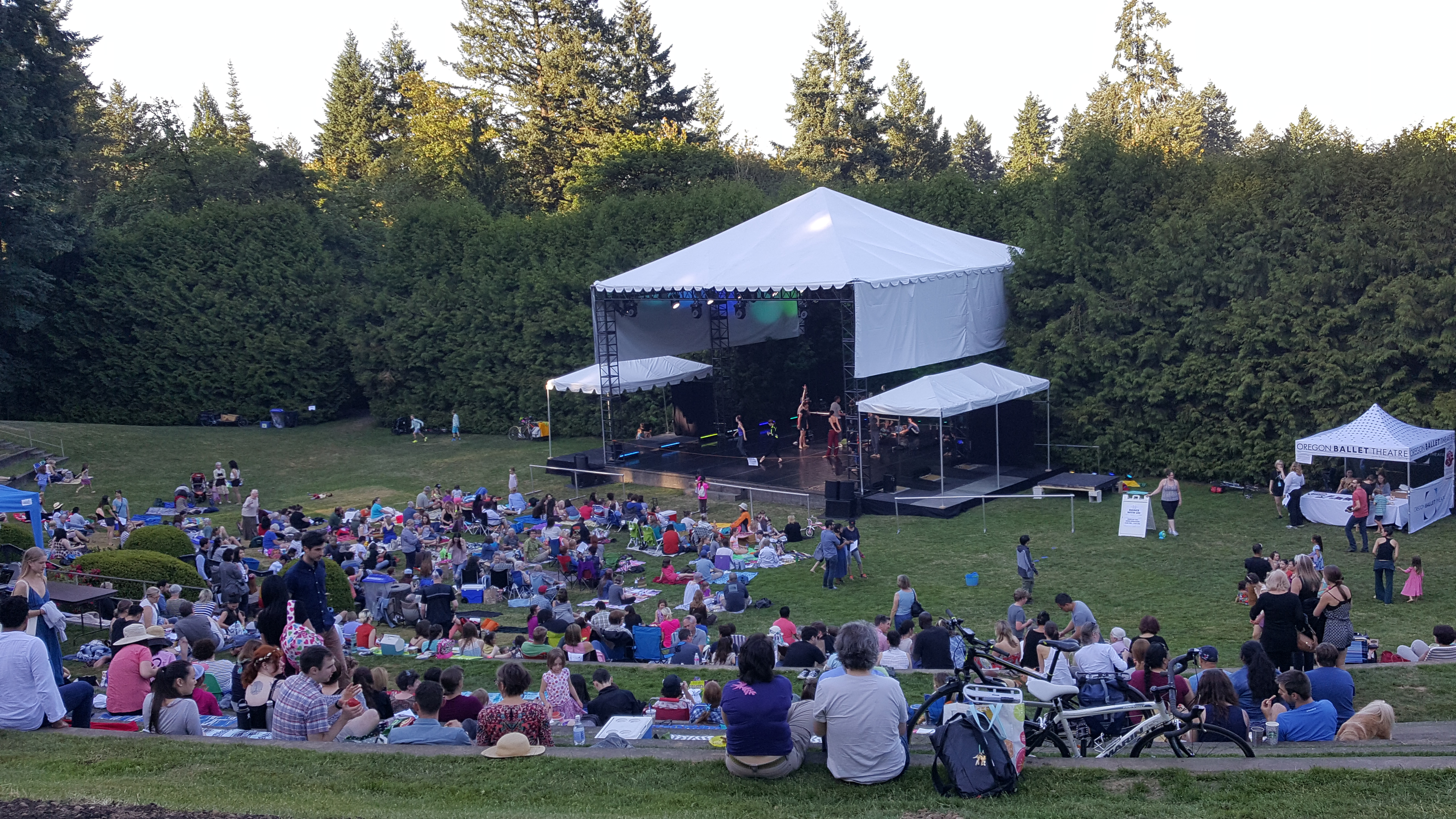
Many events are held at the amphitheater.

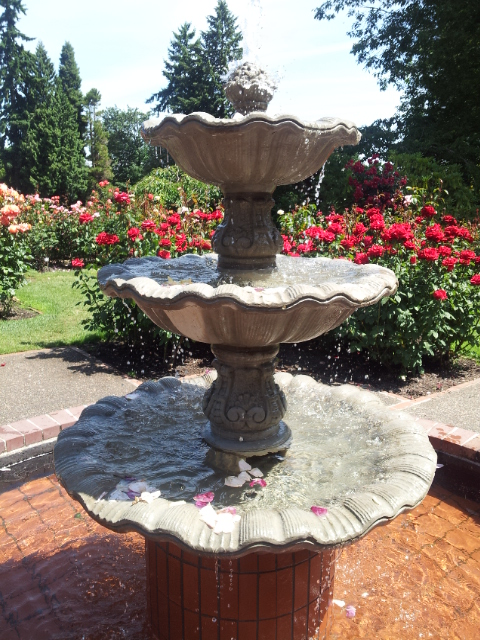
Fountain.

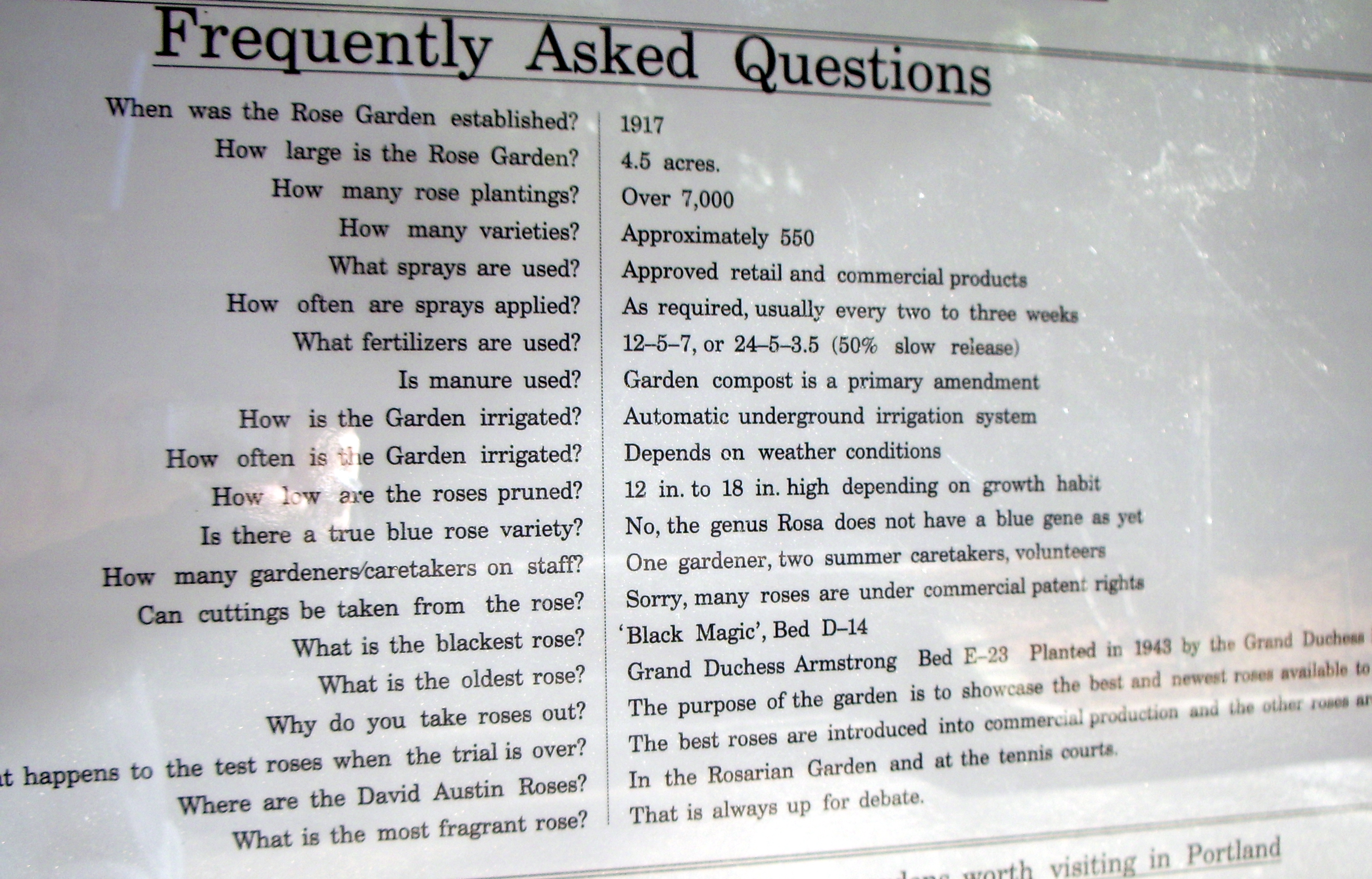
FAQ sign.

== See also ==
- All-America Rose Selections
- American Garden Rose Selections
- Roses in Portland, Oregon
