= Irving Park (Portland, Oregon) =

Public park in Portland, Oregon, U.S.

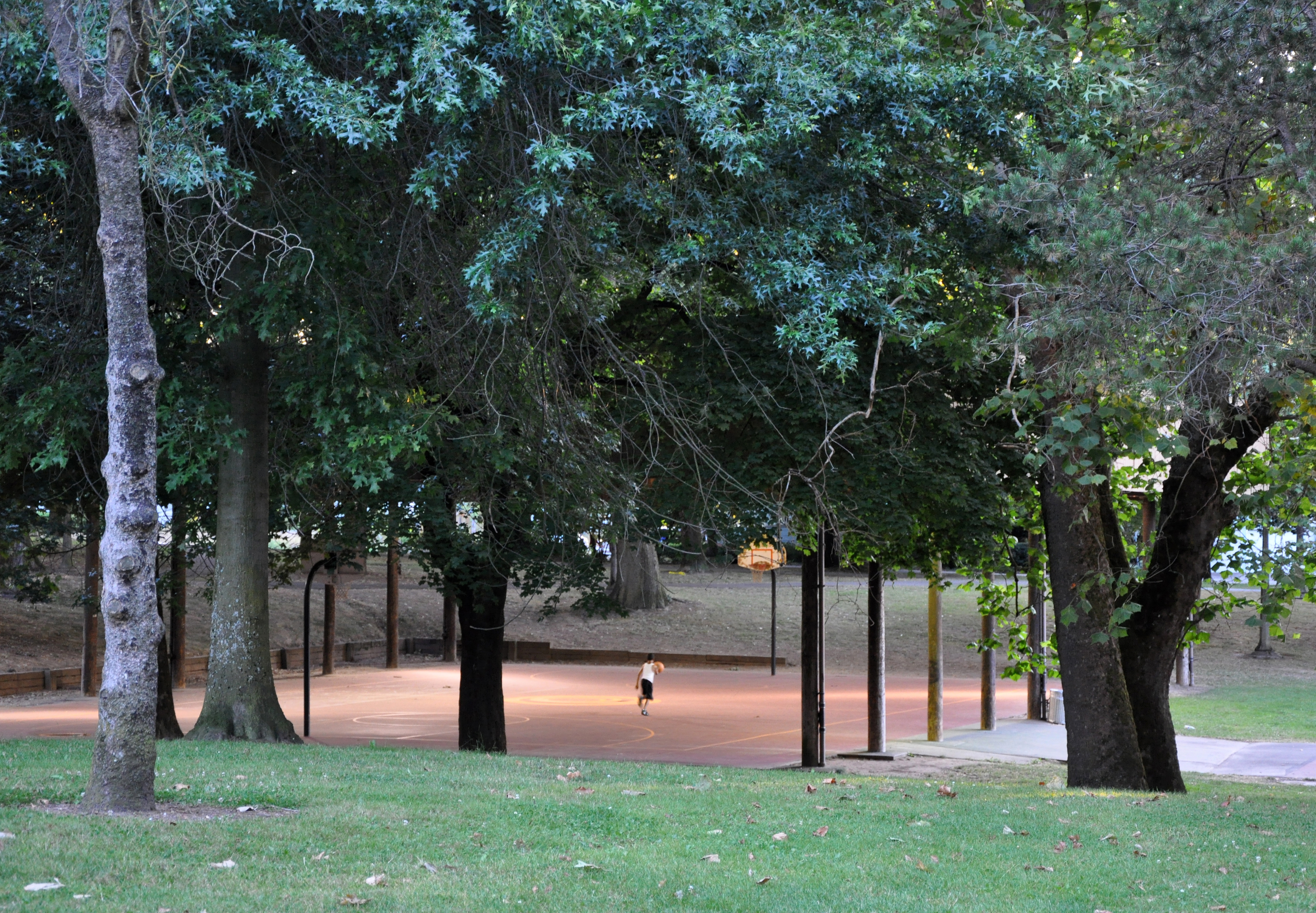
- Basketball court in the park, 2010
- Interactive map of Irving Park
- Type: Urban park
- Location: NE 7th Ave. and Fremont St. Portland, Oregon
- Coordinates: 45°32′49″N 122°39′23″W
- Area: 16.08 acres (6.51 ha)
- Designer: Florence Holmes Gerke
- Operator: Portland Parks & Recreation
- Status: Open 5 a.m. to midnight daily

Irving Park is a city park in northeast Portland, in the U.S. state of Oregon. Measuring about 16 acres (6.5 ha), it was designed by landscape architect Florence Holmes Gerke. It is located at Northeast 7th Avenue and Fremont Street in the Irvington neighborhood. The park is on land that was originally owned by William Irving, for whom the neighborhood was named. The Irvington Racetrack once occupied part of the land.

Irving was a mid-19th century mariner who operated ships on the Columbia and Willamette rivers. Arriving in Oregon in 1849, he soon acquired a donation land claim. In 1858, he sold his steamship interests in Oregon and moved to British Columbia in Canada. His land claim, left to heirs, became the Irvington subdivision in 1887. Irving Street in Portland is also named for him.

Park amenities include fields for baseball, softball, and soccer; courts for basketball, tennis, and volleyball; paved paths, picnic tables, a playground, a horseshoe pit, and an off-leash area for dogs. The park is open daily from 5 a.m. to midnight. Hours for the off-leash area are from 5 to 10 a.m. and 6 p.m. to midnight from June 15 through September 1. From September 2 through June 14, off-leash hours are from 5 to 10 a.m. and 4 p.m. to midnight.
