= Bridgeton, Portland, Oregon =

Bridgeton
- Neighborhood
- Interactive map of Bridgeton
- Coordinates: 45°36′06″N 122°40′09″W
- Country: United States
- State: Oregon
- City: Portland

Government
  - Association: Bridgeton Neighborhood Association
  - Coalition: Northeast Coalition of Neighborhoods

Area
  - Total: 0.27 sq mi (0.70 km^{2})

Population (2020)
  - Total: 996
  - Density: 3,689/sq mi (1,424/km^{2})

Housing
  - No. of households: 585
  - Occupancy rate: 80.5% occupied
  - Owner-occupied: 273 households (58%)
  - Renting: 149 households (32%)
  - Avg. household size: 1.7 persons

Bridgeton is a compact neighborhood of detached houses, rowhouses, apartment and condominium complexes, floating homes, and houseboats in the north and northeast sections of Portland, Oregon. It occupies a narrow strip of land around a levee between the Columbia River (North Portland Harbor) and Bridgeton Slough.

In 1907, a one-room schoolhouse, the Columbia School, was constructed in the area. Between 1915 and 1930, housing was developed in the area, which was the terminus of the Vancouver Interurban streetcar line. The Faloma post office served the area from August 13, 1921, to June 15, 1935; the USGS still uses this name for the place. Local citizens chose this from the initials of three local landowners (Force, Love and Moore) after the United States Postal Service rejected Bridgeton as too common.

The Bridgeton Neighborhood Association was formed in March 1992 to deal with crime and traffic issues, and shortly thereafter was instrumental in defeating a rezoning request for a superstore to be constructed nearby.

== Notable people ==
- Florence Holmes Gerke (1896–1964), landscape architect who lived in Faloma
