= Nicknames of Portland, Oregon =

Slang terms for the city in Oregon, United States

There are several well-known and commonly used nicknames referring to Portland, Oregon.

== Nicknames ==
=== City of Roses ===
The official, and also most common, nickname for Portland is The City of Roses or Rose City. The first known reference to Portland as "The City of Roses" was made by visitors to an 1888 Episcopal Church convention.

In 1889, the Portland Rose Society was founded, and promoted the planting of 20 miles (32 km) of Portland's streets with roses in advance of the 1905 Lewis and Clark Centennial Exposition. The nickname grew in popularity after the exposition, where Mayor Harry Lane suggested that the city needed a "festival of roses."

The nickname is often attributed to Leo Samuel, who founded the Oregon Life Insurance Company in 1906 (known today as Standard Insurance Company). Samuel, who moved to Portland in 1871, grew roses outside his home. He placed a pair of shears outside his garden so people could snip a rose from his garden to take for themselves. This encouraged other people and businesses to plant their own roses outside their homes and business. Today, roses are still planted outside the Standard Insurance Company's home office building in downtown Portland.

The first Portland Rose Festival was held in 1907, and remains the city's major annual festival more than a century later. In 1917, the International Rose Test Garden was established, and it now features more than 7,000 rose plants of 550 varieties. It is the oldest continuously operating public rose test garden in the United States.

The "City of Roses" nickname inspired the name for the four-year-old female Asian elephant who arrived in 1953, Rosy. The first elephant ever to live in Oregon, she remained the matriarch of the Oregon Zoo's herd and gave birth to six calves before her death in 1993. On August 31, 1994, her daughter Me-Tu became the first elephant in North America to have twins. On August 23, 2008, her granddaughter Rose-Tu (the surviving twin) gave birth to Samudra, the first third-generation elephant born in the United States.

On June 18, 2003, the city council unanimously approved a resolution adopting "City of Roses" as the city's official nickname.

=== Stumptown ===
Stumptown was coined in a period of phenomenal growth in Portland after 1847. The city was growing so rapidly that the stumps of trees were left behind until manpower could be spared to remove them. In some areas the stumps remained for so long that locals whitewashed them to make them more visible. They also used them to cross the street without sinking into the mud. Captain John C. Ainsworth commented that there were "more stumps than trees" in Portland in the early 1850s.

=== Rip City ===
The nickname Rip City is usually used in the context of the city's NBA team, the Portland Trail Blazers. The term was coined by the team's play-by-play announcer Bill Schonely during a game against the Los Angeles Lakers on February 18, 1971, the Blazers' first season. In the days prior to the three-point field goal, Blazers guard Jim Barnett took an ill-advised long-distance shot that nonetheless went in, giving the new team hope for a victory against the powerful Lakers. Excited, Schonely exclaimed "Rip City Baby!" Schonely admits that he has no idea how he came up with the expression, but it became synonymous with the team and the city of Portland.

=== Beervana ===
This nickname reflects the wide variety of craft beers brewed in Portland and throughout the state of Oregon.

=== PDX ===
The city of Portland is nicknamed PDX after the International Air Transport Association airport code for the Portland International Airport which is within the city limits. For example, the domain name for Portland State University of pdx.edu was chosen in 1987, since psu.edu had already been given to Pennsylvania State University in the previous year. As well, many Portland businesses include pdx in their web sites' domain names to denote their Portland location. Although licensed in adjacent Vancouver, WA, KPDX-TV's call letter reflect this nickname.

== Ordinary or obscure nicknames ==
=== City of Churches ===
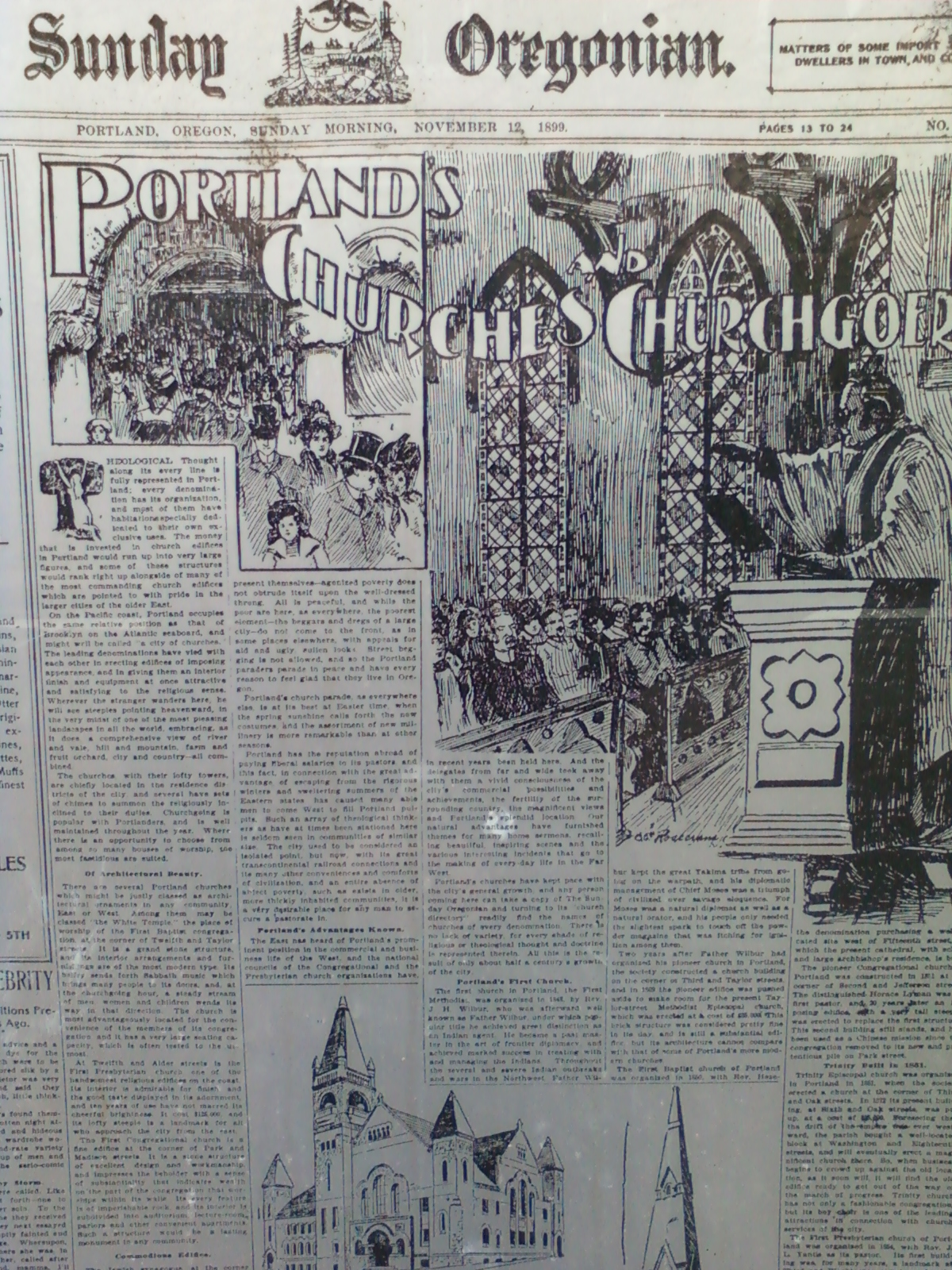

Portland was once compared with Brooklyn, New York, whose official nickname was "city of churches", by the Sunday Oregonian as seen on the front page of its November 12, 1899 issue of which a reproduction can be seen on the outside of the Oregonian's building. It reads, "On the Pacific coast, Portland occupies the same relative position as that of Brooklyn on the Atlantic seaboard and might well be called "a city of churches"...Wherever the stranger wanders here he will see steeples pointing heavenward, in the very midst of one of the most pleasing landscapes in all the world, embracing, as it does the comprehensive view of river and vale, hill and mountain, farm and fruit orchard, city and country—all combined."

In more recent years Portland is considered one of the least churched major cities in the United States.

=== Little Beirut ===
Staffers of former U.S. President George H. W. Bush used to refer to Portland as Little Beirut because of the protesters he encountered during his visits.

=== Forbidden City of the West ===
Portland has been referred to as the Forbidden City of the West, an allusion to Beijing's Forbidden City. The city received the nickname due to its history of Shanghaiing and the legends that such actions took place in the city's Shanghai tunnels.

=== P-Town ===
Portland is sometimes called P-Town by some locals.

=== Bridge City or Bridgetown ===
The City of Portland is bisected by the Willamette River. Twelve Portland bridges span the Willamette River. Because of the many bridges, Portland has earned the nickname Bridge City.

=== Soccer City USA ===
Portland is home to a MLS franchise, the Portland Timbers and a NWSL franchise, the Portland Thorns. The Portland Timbers hosted the 2021 MLS Cup. The Portland Thorns have won three NWSL Championships, most recently in 2022.

=== City of Neighborhoods ===
Because of the variety of its communities, Portland has often been termed a City of Neighborhoods.

== See also ==
- Roses in Portland, Oregon
- International Rose Test Garden
- List of city nicknames in the United States
