= Royal Rosarian =

Statue in Portland, Oregon, U.S.

- The statue in 2011
- Artist: Bill Bane
- Year: 2011
- Type: Sculpture
- Medium: Bronze
- Subject: Royal Rosarian
- Dimensions: 1.9 m × 0.66 m × 0.51 m (6.2 ft × 2.2 ft × 1.7 ft)
- Location: Portland, Oregon, United States; 45.51837°N 122.70552°W
- Owner: City of Portland

Royal Rosarian is an outdoor 2011 bronze sculpture by American artist Bill Bane, located at the International Rose Test Garden, Washington Park in Portland, Oregon, United States.

== Description and history ==
Royal Rosarian, designed by Oregon artist Bill Bane, was installed in Washington Park in 2011, becoming the park's third bronze sculpture. Depicting a Royal Rosarian tipping his hat, the sculpture measures 76 inches (1.9 m) x 26 inches (0.66 m) x 20 inches (0.51 m). It cost $41,000 and was commissioned by the Rosarians and the Royal Rosarian Foundation to commemorate the civic group's 100th anniversary. A dedication ceremony was held in October 2011, beginning a series of celebrations associated with the organization's centennial. The statue was presented to City Commissioner Nick Fish as a gift to Portland from the Royal Rosarians. It is owned by the City of Portland.

== See also ==
- 2011 in art
