= Peninsula Park =

Public park in Portland, Oregon, U.S.

Coordinates: 45.568015°N 122.673168°W

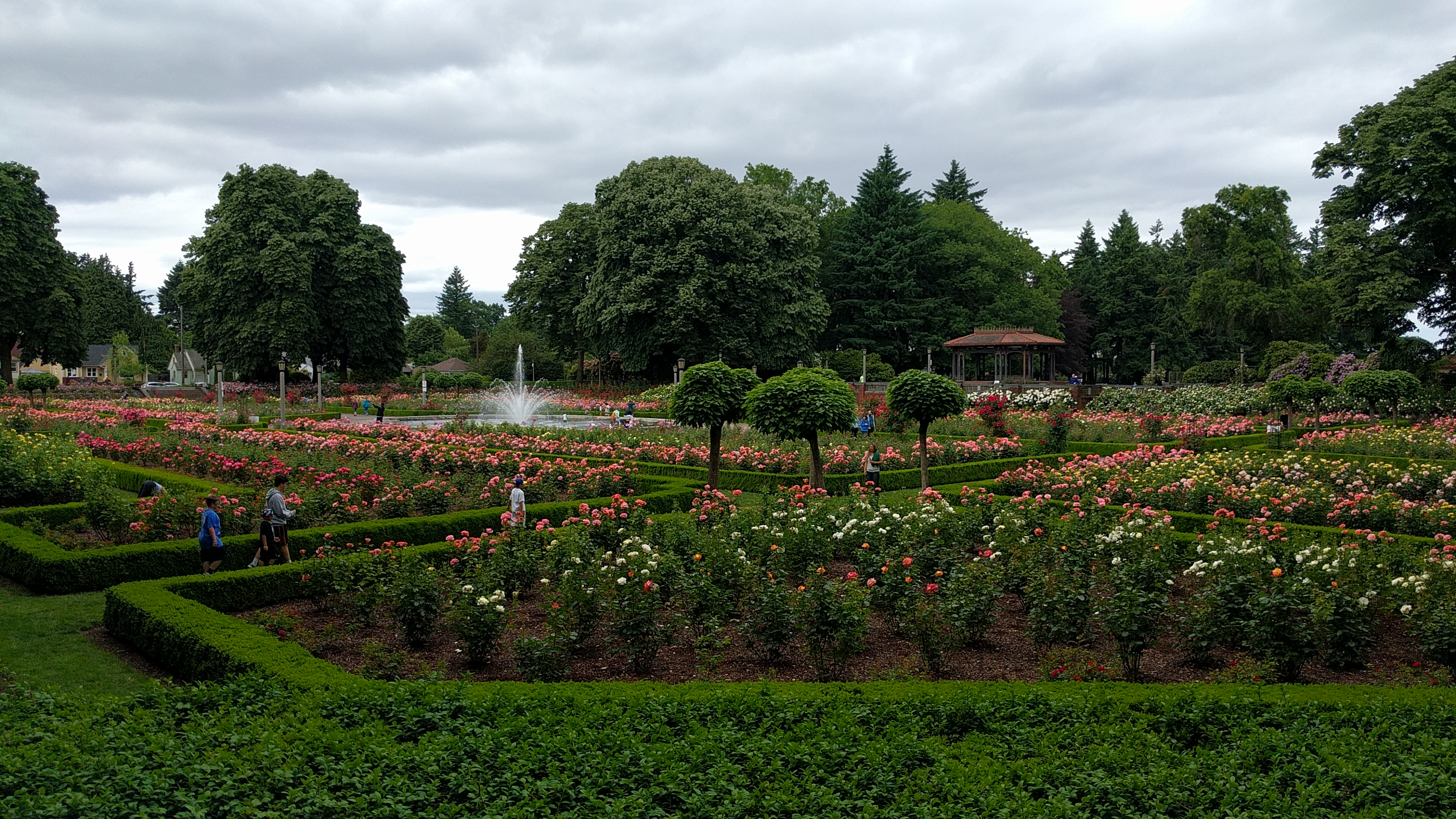
- The park's rose garden in 2017
- Interactive map of Peninsula Park
- Location: 700 N. Rosa Parks Way; Portland, Oregon, United States
- Area: 16.27 acres (6.58 ha)
- Created: 1909
- Operator: Portland Parks & Recreation
- Status: Open 5 a.m. to midnight daily

Peninsula Park is a public park in the Piedmont neighborhood of Portland, Oregon, United States. The 16.27-acre (6.58 ha) park is located in the North Portland neighborhood and contains an outdoor swimming pool, community center, baseball fields, playgrounds, basketball courts, tennis courts, covered picnic areas, a historic gazebo and other amenities. In 2007, area residents started to propose a piece of public art be added to the park honoring Rosa Parks, as the park lies along Rosa Parks Way.

== Rose garden ==
Peninsula Park became the city's first public rose garden in 1909 when it was purchased for $60,000 with funds raised in a 1908 bond measure. Designed by Emanuel L. Mische, the two-acre garden contains 5,700 roses featuring 75 varieties. The official rose of Portland, named Mme. Caroline Testout, was cultivated at Peninsula Park. In 1913, the park was chosen as the location for an annual rose show, where it remained until Washington Park was selected as the location of the International Rose Test Garden in 1917.

== See also ==
- List of parks in Portland, Oregon
- Roses in Portland, Oregon
