= Florence Holmes Gerke =

American landscape architect

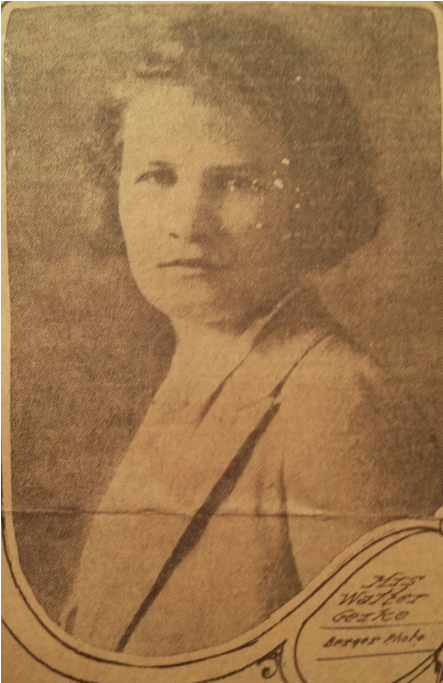
- Florence Holmes Gerke (1923)
- Born: Florence Holmes Hill; February 16, 1898; Portland, Oregon, U.S.
- Died: August 22, 1964 (aged 66); Portland, Oregon
- Education: Oregon State Agricultural College; Cambridge School of Architecture and Landscape Architecture; Museum Art School
- Occupation: Landscape architect
- Spouse: Walter Henry Gerke
- Children: 1
- Parents: Joseph A. Hill; Edith Knight Holmes Hill
- Relatives: Mary Holmes Goodall (sister)
- Practice: Municipal Landscape Architect, City of Portland
- Design: International Rose Test Garden

Florence Holmes Gerke (1898–1964) was an American landscape architect and newspaper editor.

== Early life and education ==
Florence Holmes Hill was born in Portland, Oregon, February 16, 1898. Her father was Joseph A. Hill. Her mother, Edith Knight Holmes Hill, was acolumnist for The Oregonian, while her sister, Mary Holmes Goodall, was a columnist for The Oregon Daily Journal.

In her early life, Gerke was a resident of San Francisco and Oakland, California.

She was a graduate of the Oregon State Agricultural College in Landscape Architecture. She studied gardens in Europe, and took a post graduate course at the Cambridge School of Architecture and Landscape Architecture, Cambridge, Massachusetts. She also attended Museum Art School at the Portland Art Museum.

== Career ==
Gerke served as municipal Landscape Architect for the City of Portland and designed Grant Park, Irving Park, Dawson Park, and Eastmoreland's Shakespeare Garden. She designed the International Rose Test Garden and the amphitheater at Washington Park and many features of Portland parks and playgrounds. She also designed the planting for Shriners Hospital for Children, and several other public and private institutions. With her husband, she worked on the gardens at Lloyd Center and Dammasch State Hospital.

Gerke wrote many articles for leading technical magazines on landscaping, as well as in American Home, House Beautiful, and Sunset. She served as club and society editor at the Portland Telegram before becoming an editor for The Oregon Daily Journal, where she wrote a weekly series.

She was a member of the Professional Woman's League, Chi Omega. She made her home in Faloma, Multnomah County, Oregon.

== Personal life ==
She married Walter Henry Gerke (c. 1891–1982), a landscape architect. They had a daughter, Marianne.

Florence Holmes Gerke died in Portland, Oregon, August 22, 1964.

The Walter H. and Florence Holmes Gerke landscape architecture drawings and photographs are held by the University of Oregon Libraries.

== Selected works ==
- "Public Convenience Buildings in the Parks of Portland Oregon", Architectural Record, January 1927, vol. 61, no. 1, pp. 23–26 (text)
- "The Garden Theater", The Playground, May 1925, vol. 10, no. 2, p. 100 (text)
- "The Industrious Anemone", Garden Magazine & Home Builder, May 1925, vol. 41, no. 3, p. 238 (text)
- "Oregon Women who Farm and Garden", Farm and Garden, December 1922, vol. 10, no. 6, p. 3-6 (text)
