= Dawson Park (Portland, Oregon) =

Public park in Portland, Oregon, U.S.

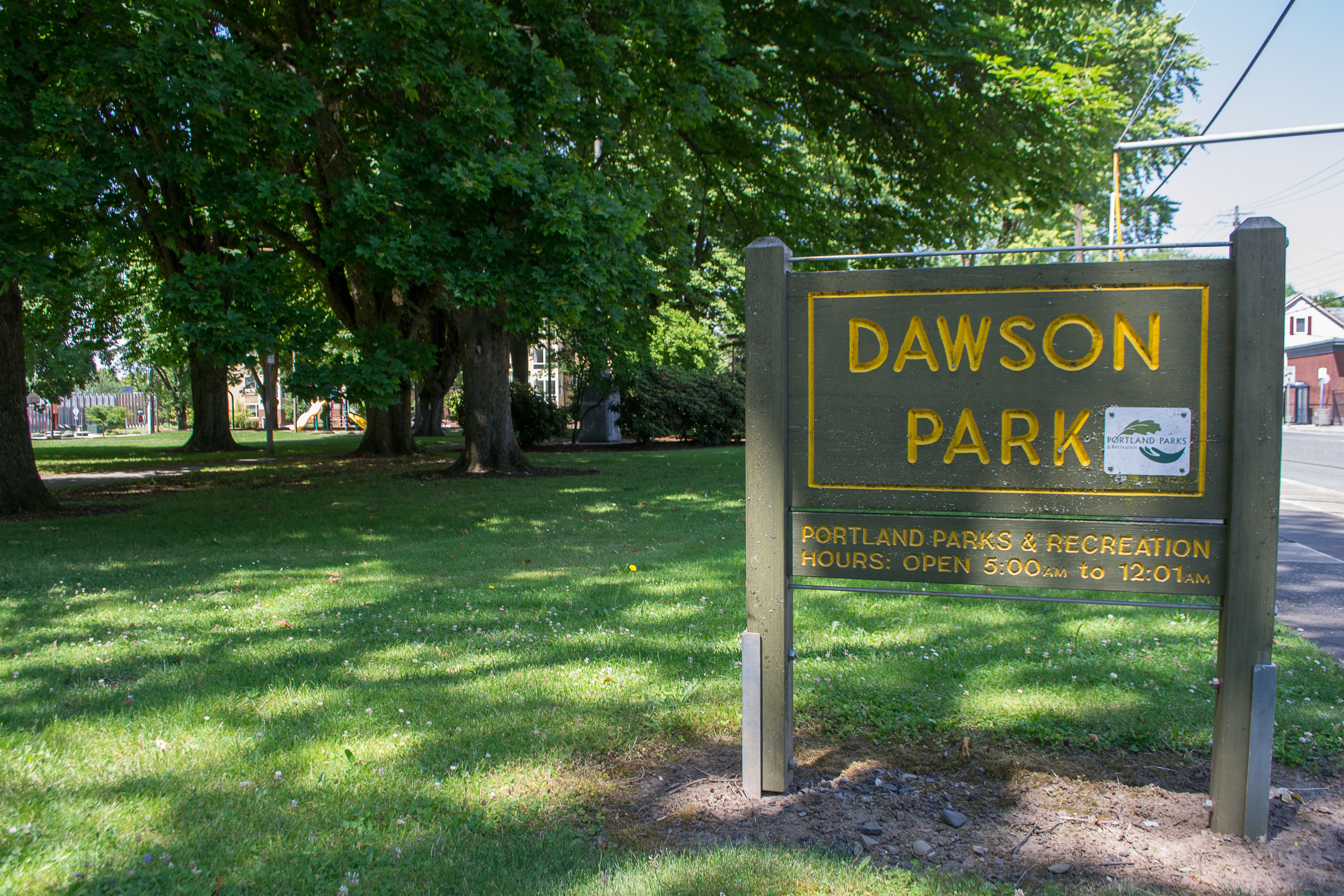
- Signage for the park in 2013
- Interactive map of Dawson Park
- Location: N Stanton St. and Williams Ave. Portland, Oregon
- Coordinates: 45°32′39″N 122°40′03″W
- Area: 2.05 acres (0.83 ha)
- Created: 1921
- Designer: Florence Holmes Gerke
- Operator: Portland Parks & Recreation

Dawson Park is a historic urban park in north Portland, Oregon, in the United States. The 2.05 acres (0.83 ha) park is located at Stanton Street and North Williams Avenue.

== History ==
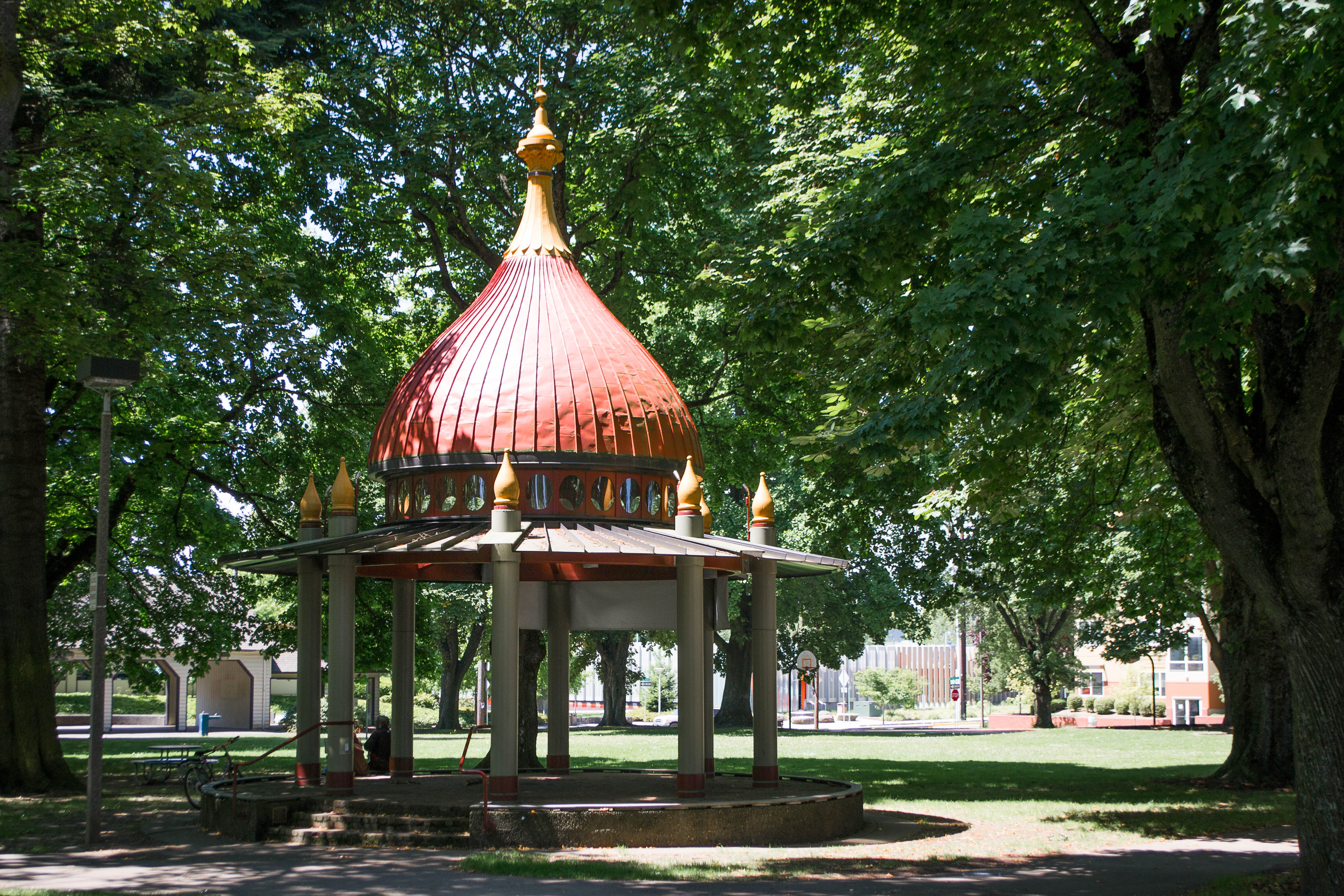
Gazebo in 2013

Dawson Park was designed by Florence Holmes Gerke, and acquired by Portland Parks & Recreation in 1921.

In November 2013, a $2.6 million renovation began, resulting in the park's closure for nearly a year. City officials, aware of gentrification of the surrounding neighborhood, utilized community input to preserve the park's role as a gathering place favored by African Americans. The upgraded park now includes a new playground and interactive water feature, enhanced accessibility and lighting, and new barbecue and picnic areas. Dawson Park also features double-sided artistic medallions designed by Isaka Shamsud-Din, with traditional African patterns on one side and depictions of the neighborhood on the opposite side. Additionally, the twelve artistic "story boulders" were added to the park to help preserve its history.

== See also ==
- African Americans in Oregon
- List of parks in Portland, Oregon
