= Lambert Gardens =

Botanical garden open in Portland, Oregon between 1930 and 1968

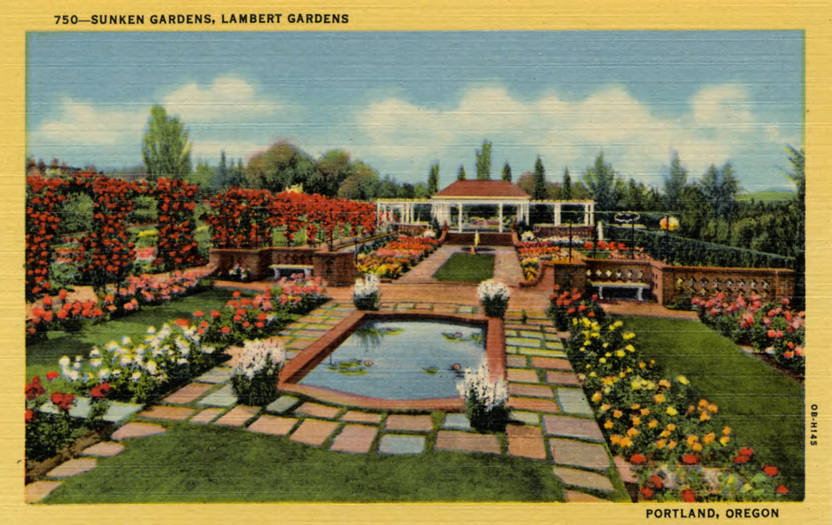
- 1940s postcard featuring the reflecting pool in the Sunken Gardens
- Interactive map of Lambert Gardens
- Type: Botanical garden
- Location: Portland, Oregon, United States
- Coordinates: 45°29′9.11″N 122°38′13.9″W
- Area: 30-acre (12 ha)
- Opened: 1930
- Closed: 1968
- Owner: Andrew Lambert
- Visitors: 2,000,000+
- Status: Closed
- Collections: Sunken Rose Gardens; Italian Court; English Gardens; Spanish Gardens; French Gardens

Lambert Gardens was a botanical garden of over 30 acres (120,000 m^{2}) in the Reed neighborhood of Portland, Oregon, USA. It opened in 1930 and closed in 1968 and had a total estimated visitor count of 2,000,000, most of them believed to be out-of-towners.

== History ==
Andrew Lambert, a landscaper in Georgia, visited Portland in 1925 and liked the flora so much he decided to settle there permanently. He gave his half of the family business to his brother and purchased land at 5120 SE 28th Avenue in the late 1920s. He also bought 25 unused and overgrown acres from the nearby Reed College to start his gardens and by 1930, it was a tourist attraction. Despite the high unemployment rate during the Great Depression, Lambert was able to employ 20 landscapers to look after the gardens, including the Sunken Rose Gardens and the Italian Court. The gardens were home to peacocks, cranes such as the grey crowned crane, and flamingos. Money from the wishing well was given to the Oregon School for the Blind. After thieves stole hundreds of dollars from the wishing well on multiple occasions, Lambert decided to put up a 10 foot fence around the perimeter of the gardens.

While most of the visitors to Lambert Gardens were from out of town, Lambert was an active part of the community. He sold plants, including tulips imported from Holland, out of the gardens' nursery and collaborated on a number of projects with Meier & Frank. Each June, he reserved a plot for the town's Rose Festival so the elected queen and her court could take photos in front of it, and each Christmas, traditionally the slow season for botanical gardens, the Lambert Gardens had what was described as "one of the largest illuminated displays in the city". The gardens were used for weddings, entertaining dignitaries, and political speeches. Gardens employees also appeared on local TV to give gardening demonstrations, such as preparing a flowerbed for planting. The landscaping was so popular that in 1934, Lambert and his crew were hired to plant around the nearby U.S. Customs Courthouse. Some years later, they were also hired to overhaul and renovate the grounds at the University of Portland.

By 1968, Lambert sought a buyer for the gardens as he was becoming too old to maintain them but was unsuccessful. A development company eventually bought the plot to build a $16 million, 1,000-unit apartment complex, called Lambert Gardens Apartments. In 2005, another company bought the complex and renamed it Wimbledon Gardens.

Lambert died in January 1974.
