= Toret =

Bull-head drinking fountain in Turin, Italy

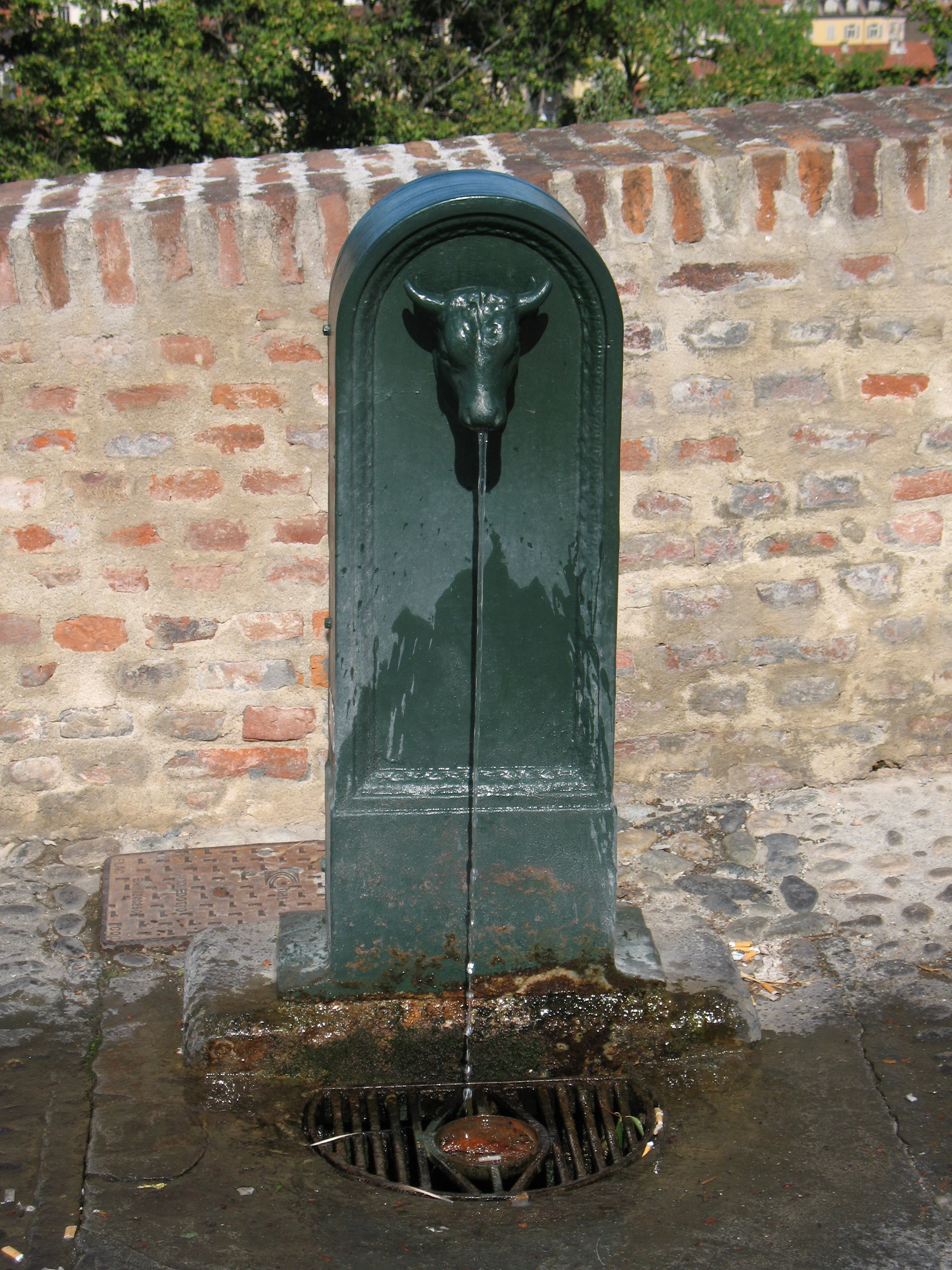
A toret at Monte dei Cappuccini

Torèt (IPA tʊˈrɛt) is a word in the Piemontese language that literally means "little bull". The term usually refers to the bull-head design of a type of public drinking fountain found across the city of Turin, Italy, which has become a symbol of the city itself.

== Description ==
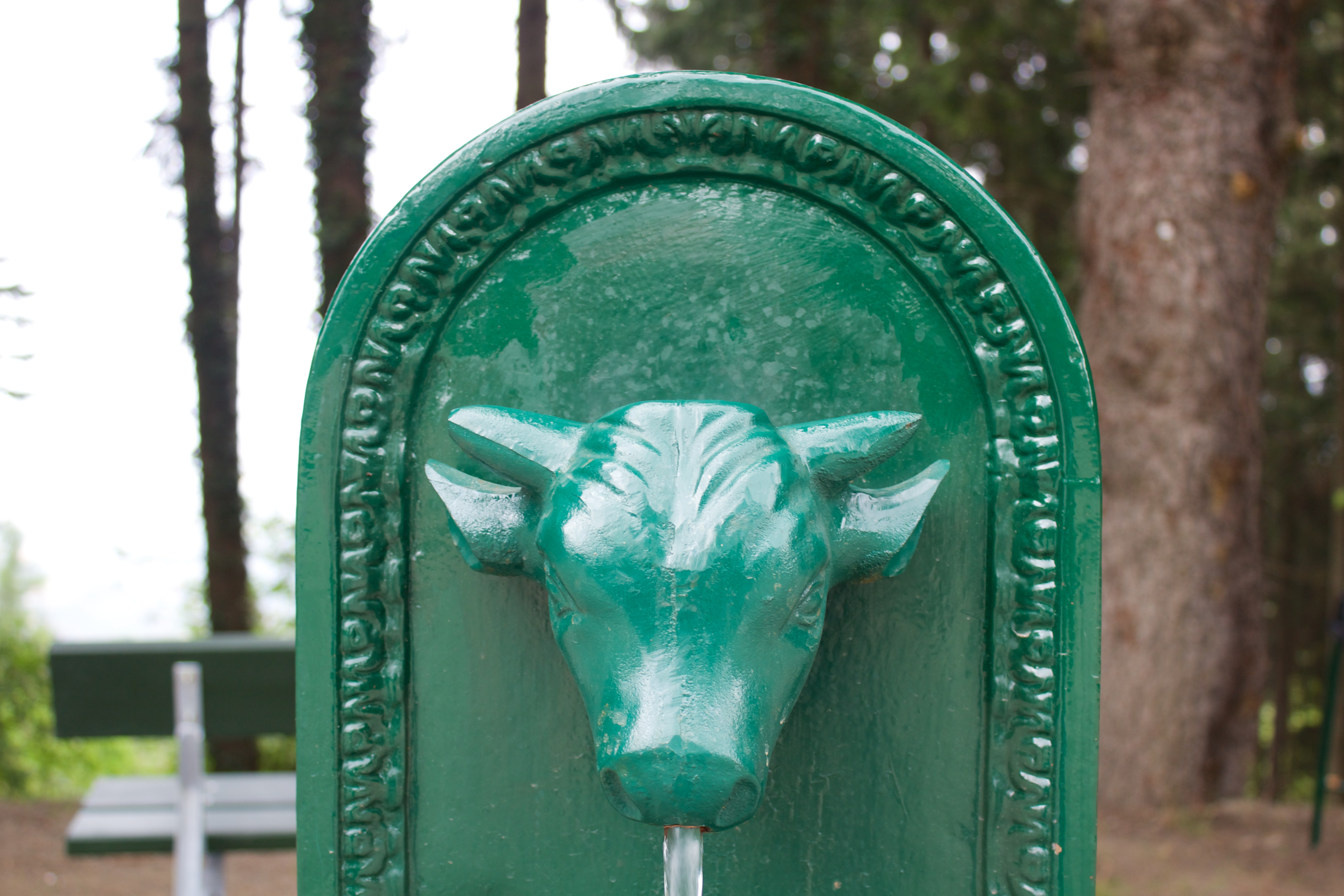
A typical toret.

The fountains are made from cast iron, with a vertical parallel-piped structure enclosed by a semi-cylindrical vault; it is painted a distinctive forest green. The spout on the front consists of a small bull's head with water flowing from its mouth. The bull's head is significant due to its status as the symbol of the city of Turin, also present on the official city emblems. The installation is completed on the ground by a semi-circular drainage grate, often featuring a central basin.

== History ==
According to documents held in the Historical Archives of Turin, the first project for the installation of drinking fountains in the city dates back to April 23, 1861 by the then chief engineer of the city of Turin, Edoardo Pecco. The document identifies 81 water supply points for various uses (drinking, irrigation, fire prevention, etc.) and specifies that some of them will make "decoration their main purpose".

On March 27, 1862, the City Council approved the installation of 21 drinking fountains, the first of which was installed in Borgo San Donato; Attached to the document are the plans for the new fountains, which in the drawings already fully present the "toret" shape still in use today. On July 7, 1862, the City Council decided that it was appropriate to increase the number of fountains to be installed to 45. Finally, following the signing of the "Conditions for the supply of cast iron fountains to be placed on public land" between the mayor of Turin, the councilors, and the founder Martino Polla (who committed to providing four fountains per week), the actual installation of the "toret" began: the document is dated July 17, 1862.

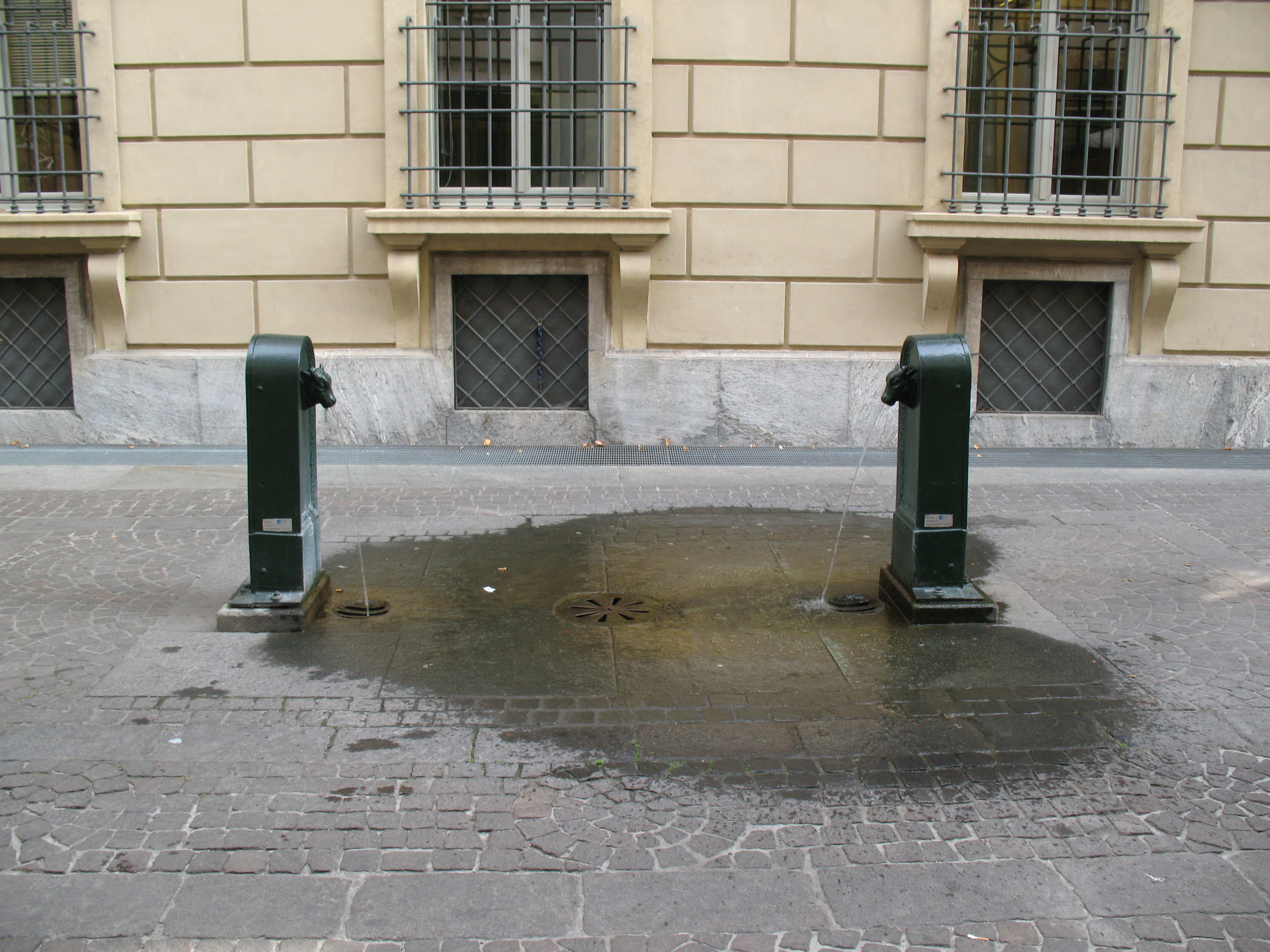
A "double" toret on Via Stampatori

In 1868, some of these fountains were already operational: in an article published in September 1868 in the "Rivista contemporanea" and titled "The Drinking Water Pipeline and the Turin City Hall; Historical and Statistical Notes", on page 349 the author writes "of the small fountains that the numerous bulls' heads are perpetually pouring out at various points in the city," evidently referring to the "toret".

By the 1930s the "toret" were numerous in the streets and squares of Turin, especially near the market areas, along the large tree-lined avenues, and in the public gardens. The cast-iron works, now produced by the Pinerolese Foundry of Frossasco, were occasionally replaced by large stone models, mainly located in the stately areas of the monumental gardens and on the hills.

Today, there are approximately 800 "toret" scattered throughout the streets of Turin. The water that fed the fountains originally came from the aqueduct of the Pian della Mussa and from the Dora Riparia basin near Collegno. Today they are fed by the ordinary municipal aqueduct network, which mixes spring water with water drawn from underground aquifers and sanitized water from the Po River.

== See also ==
- Nasone

== Bibliography ==
- Rossotti, Renzo (2008). Guida Insolita ai misteri, ai segreti, alle leggende e alle curiosità di Torino. Newton Compton Editori. under the term "Torèt"
- Fiorentini, Paola (2009). 101 cose da fare a Torino almeno una volta nella vita. Newton Compton Editori. pp. 101–103. ISBN 978-88-541-1455-5.
- Humbert, Riccardo (2006). Torinesi. Guida ai migliori difetti e alle peggiori virtù. Edizioni Sonda. pp. 88–90 and 145-147. ISBN 978-88-7106-542-7.
