= Pulpulak =

Armenian drinking fountain

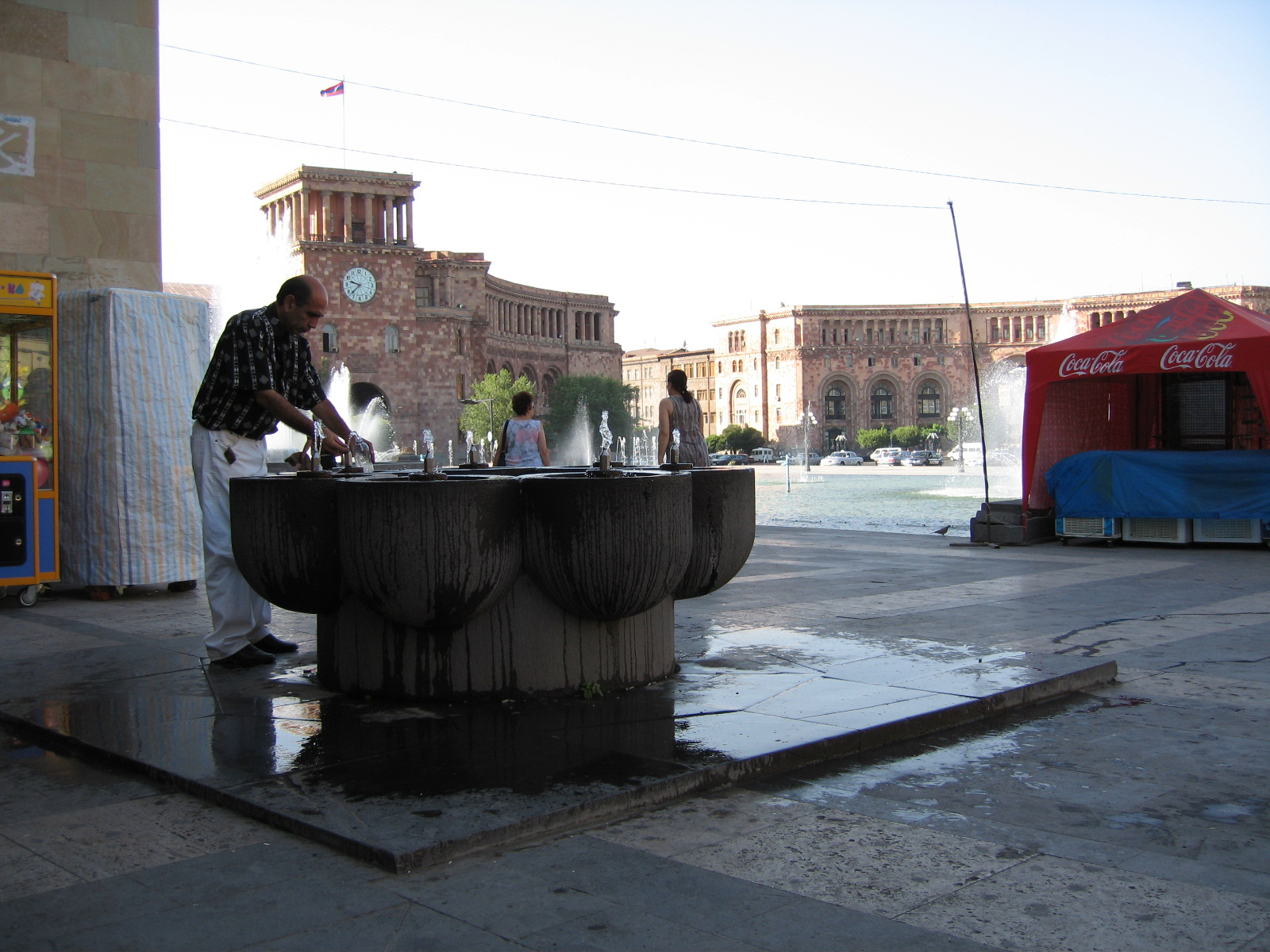
In Yerevan's Republic Square

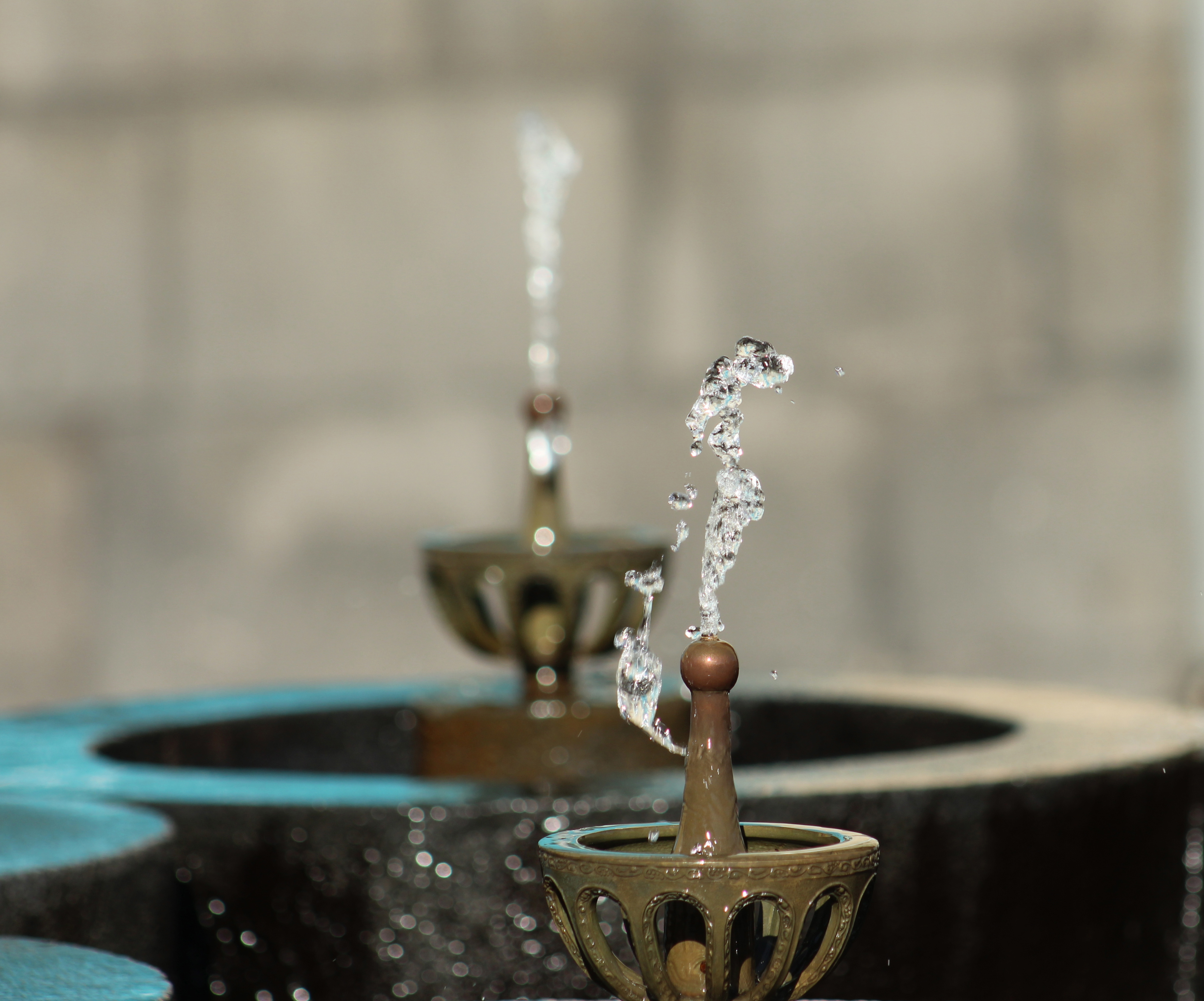
A closeup look at a pulpulak

A pulpulak (Armenian: պուլպուլակ, Armenian pronunciation: [pulpuˈlɑk]) is a public water fountain common in Armenia and in the former Armenian-populated Republic of Artsakh. Pulpulaks are a significant part of Armenian culture, and first appeared on the streets of Yerevan in the 1920s before becoming extremely popular. Pulpulaks were, and still are, often used by people to appoint meetings and by couples as dating locations.

== Name ==
The word pulpulak is colloquial and derives from the sound of the murmuring of water "pul-pul", suffixed with "ak" (ակ), meaning "water source". They are rarely referred to as tsaytaghbyur (Armenian: ցայտաղբյուր), meaning "squirt spring".

== Description ==
Pulpulaks are small, usually one meter tall, stone memorials with running water, often fed by a mountain spring. Some pulpulaks are erected in memory of dead relatives. In drinking from a memorial pulpulak, passersby give their blessing to the person in memory of whom it is constructed. Memorial pulpulaks are related to khatchkars.

== Yotnaghbyur ==
Yotnaghbyur (Յոթնաղբյուր, meaning "seven springs") is the name of the famous pulpulak in Yerevan's Republic Square. It was erected by Spartak Gndeghtsyan in 1965, and was restored in 2008 by Moscow-based Armenian designer Nur.

== Gallery ==
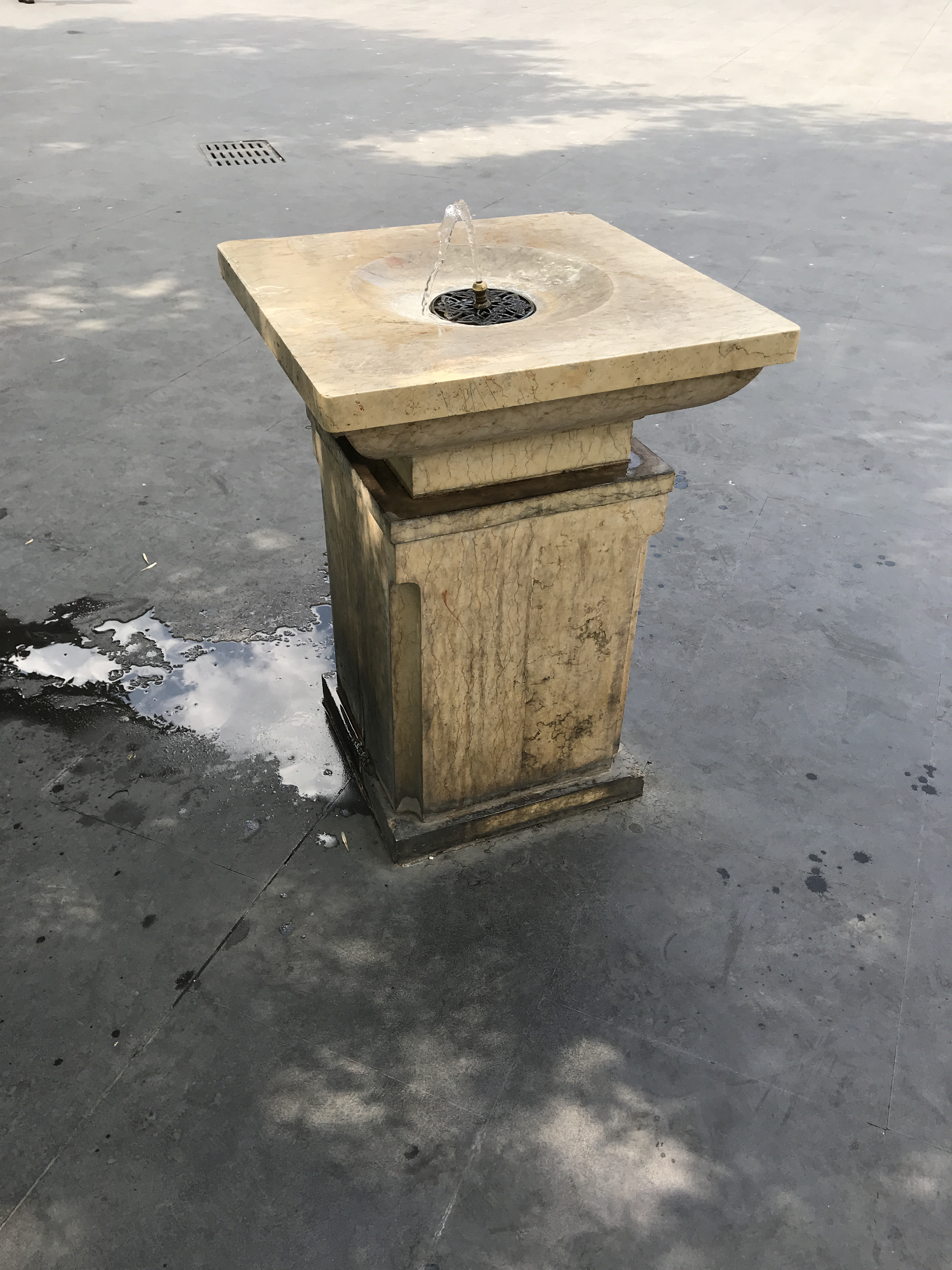
Pulpulak near the Katoghike Church, Yerevan

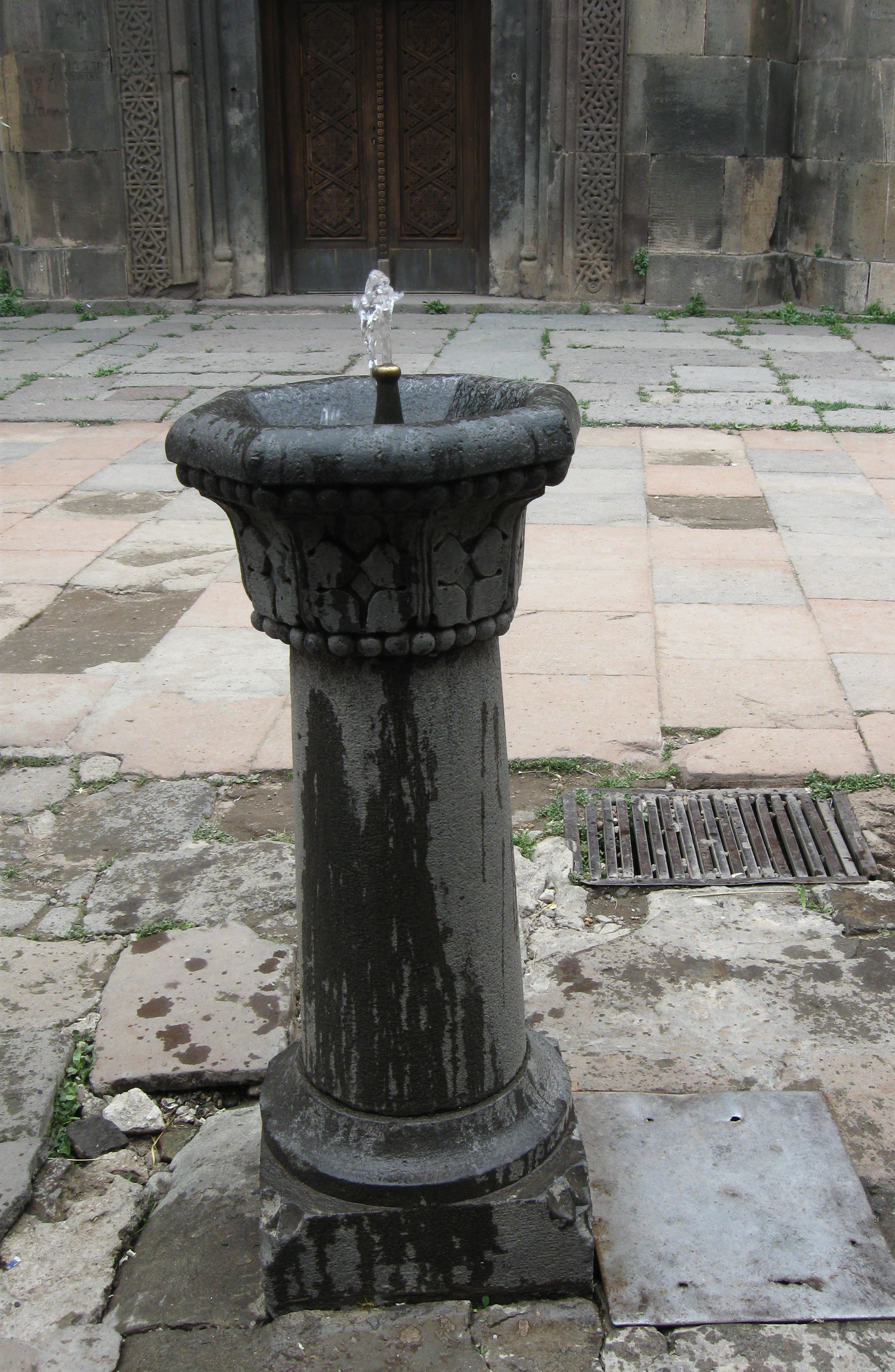
Pulpulak near the Geghard monastery

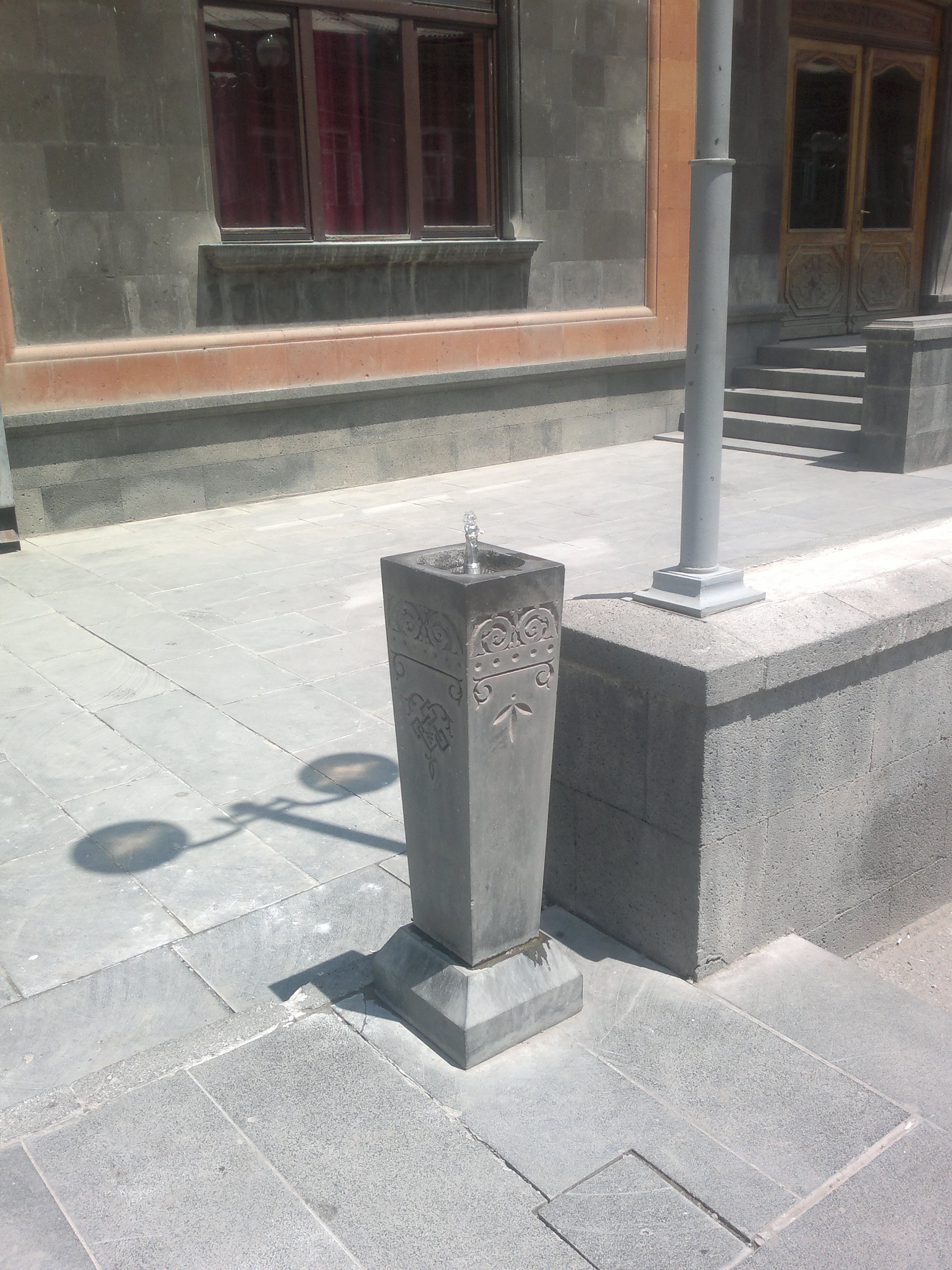

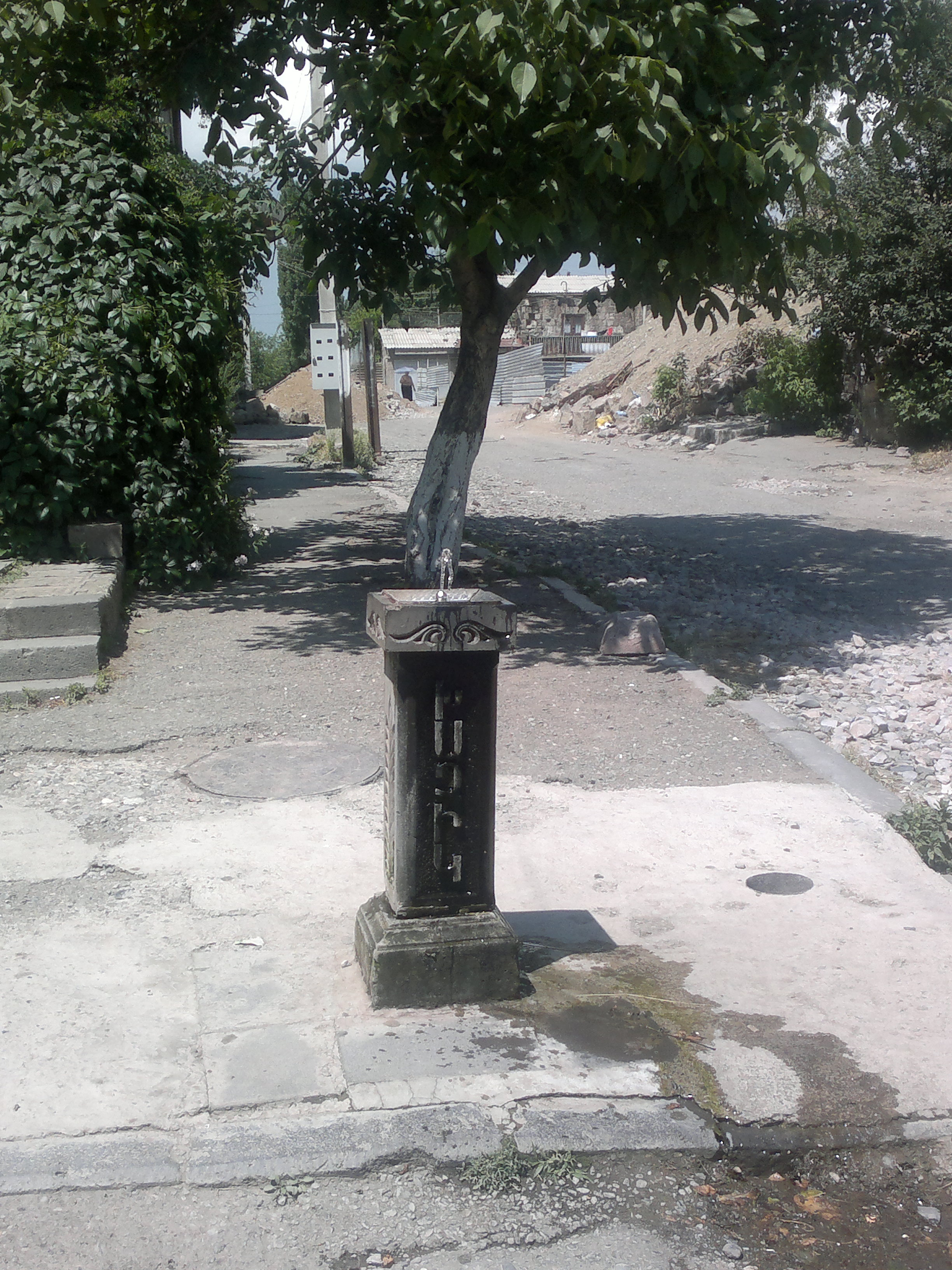

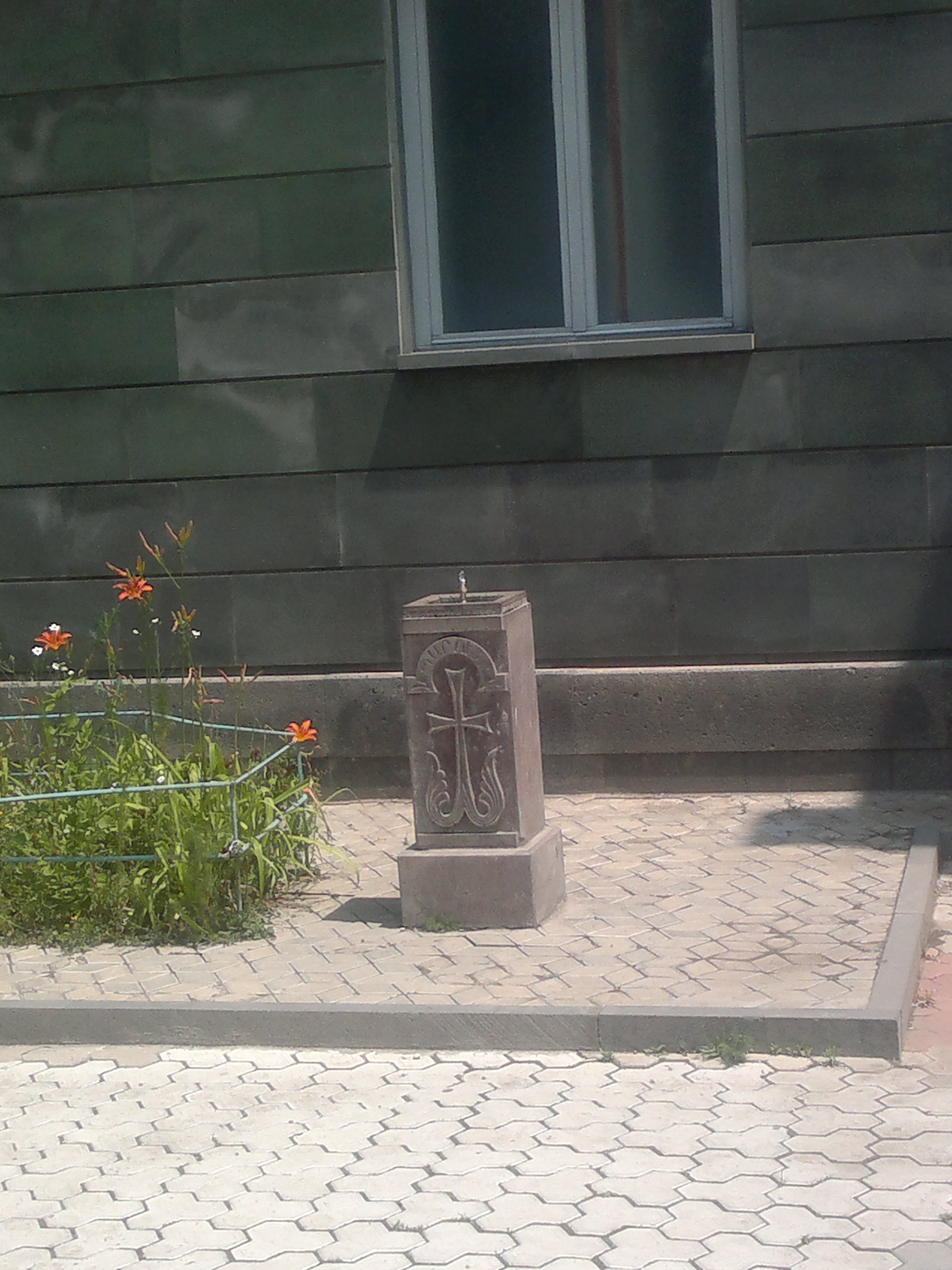

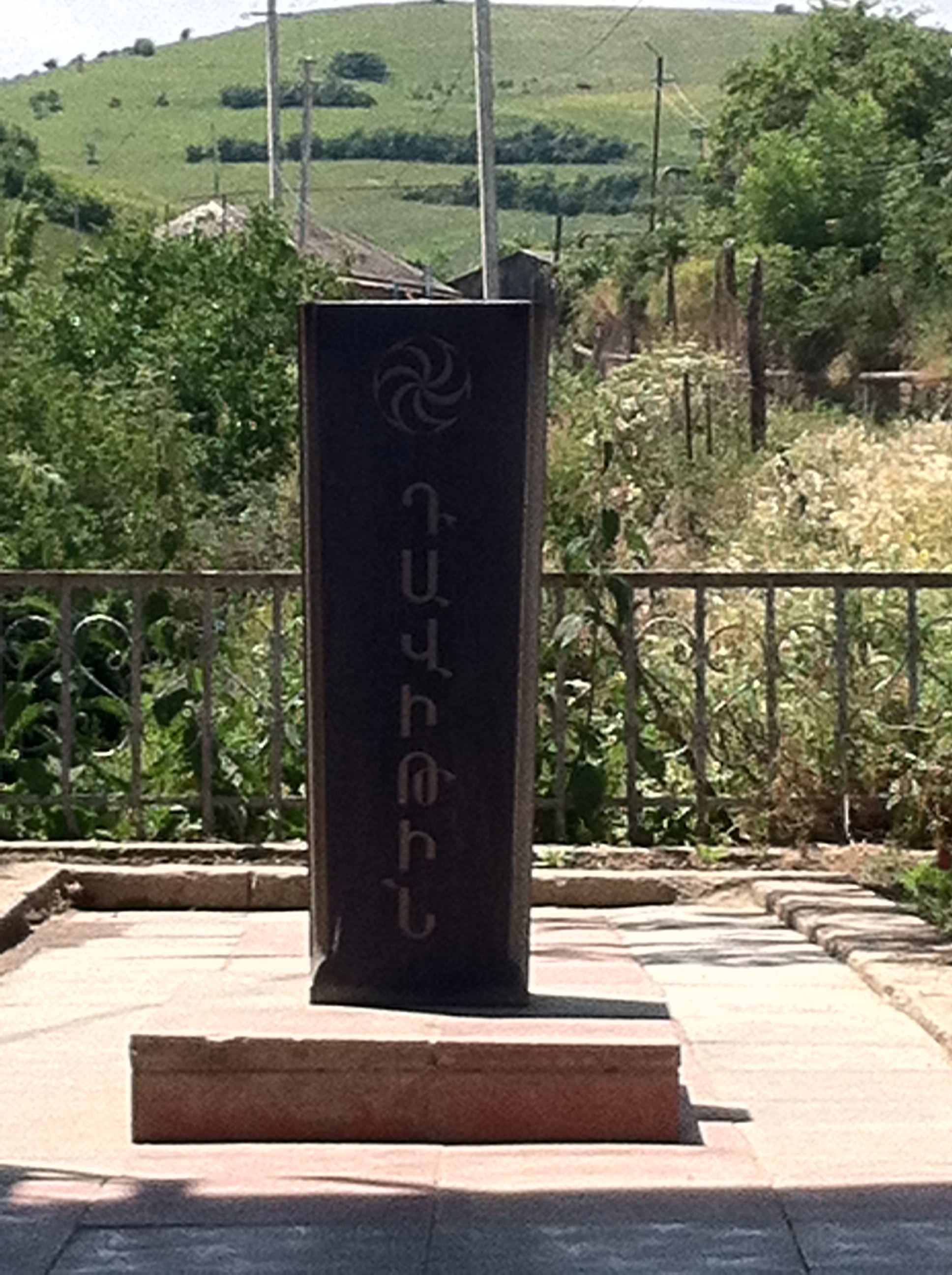

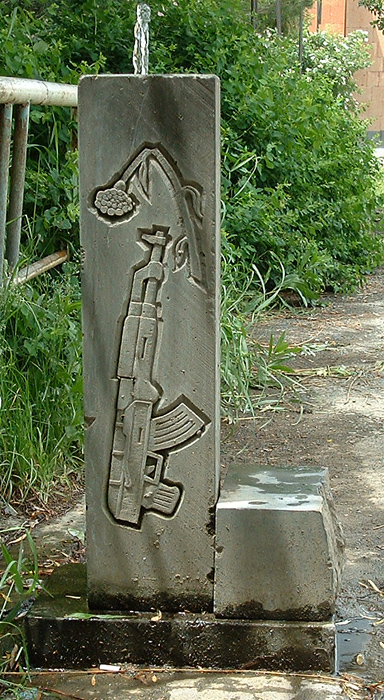
Pulpulak in honor of an Armenian soldier killed in the First Nagorno-Karabakh War

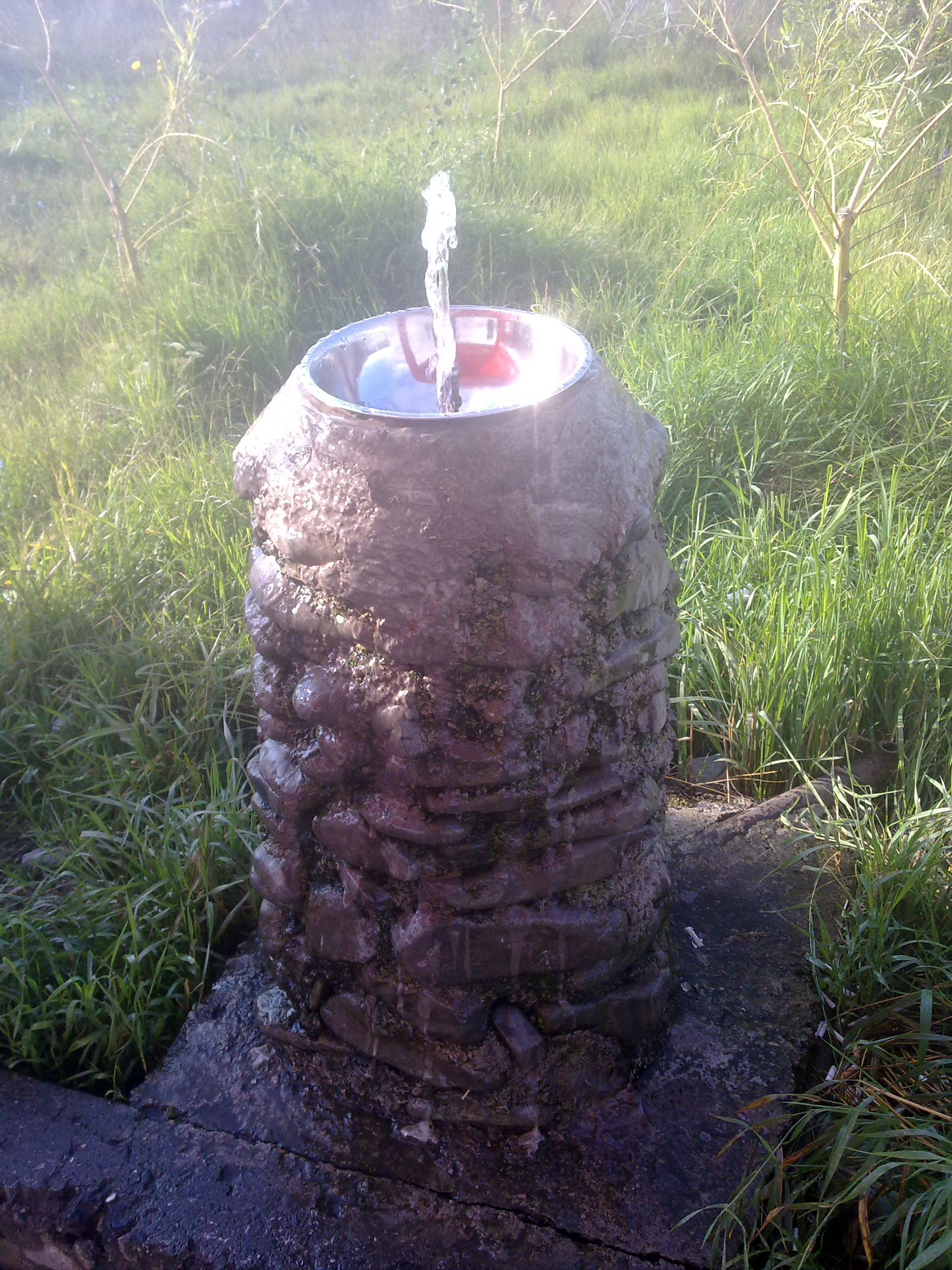
In Gegharkunik Province

In Bjni

== See also ==
- Khatchkars
- Armenian architecture
