= Nasone =

Public drinking water fountain in Rome

- Fountain
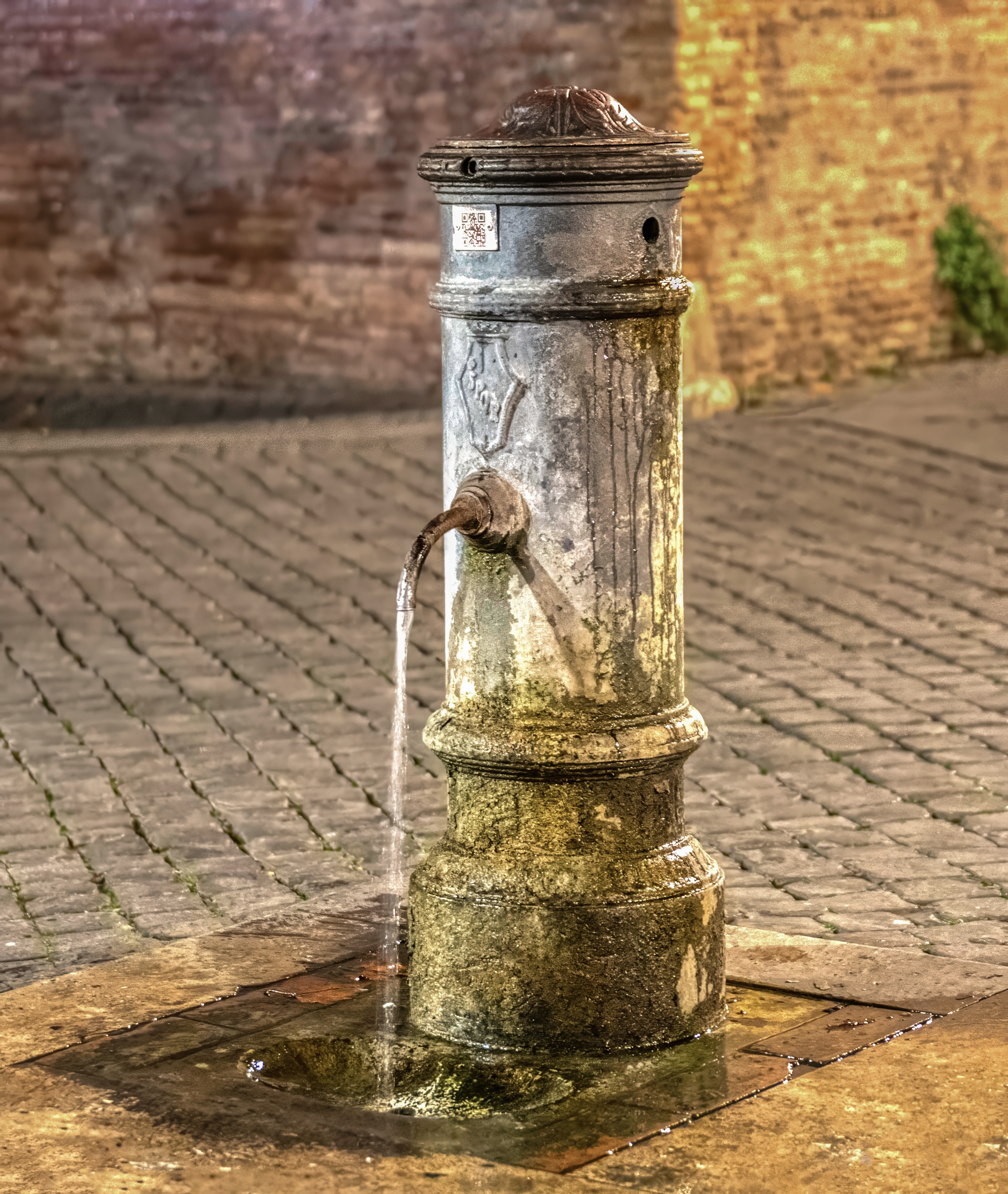
- A nasone from the 1930s
- Location: Piazza Sidney Sonnino, Rome, Italy

A nasone (plural nasoni), also called a fontanella (plural fontanelle, lit. "little fountains"), is a type of drinking fountain found in Rome, Italy. Literally meaning "large nose", they got their name from their characteristic design first introduced in the 1870s. There are approximately 2,500–2,800 nasoni in Rome, supplying people with free drinking water.

== Design ==
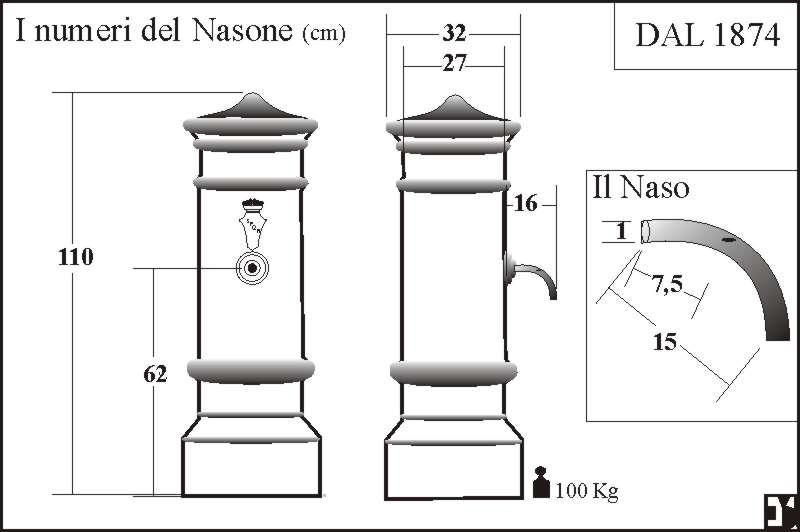
Schematics of a typical nasone.

Most nasoni share a design in the shape of a column. The form of the water spout varies but most nasoni have a metal spout protruding at mid-height which looks like a nose and gives the fountains their name "large noses". Other designs include wolf-heads, dragons and lions. Most are made of cast iron, although in the 1920s and 1930s nasoni were made of travertine marble, some of which remain today, mostly in parks and the Foro Italico area.

The water coming from the nasoni is the same supplied to the city's households and thus safe for drinking. It is continuously running from the fountain through a hole at the bottom of the spout. Additionally, most nasoni have a hole located at the top of the spout, allowing thirsty people to drink from the fountain more easily by blocking the bottom hole and forcing the water upwards.

== History ==
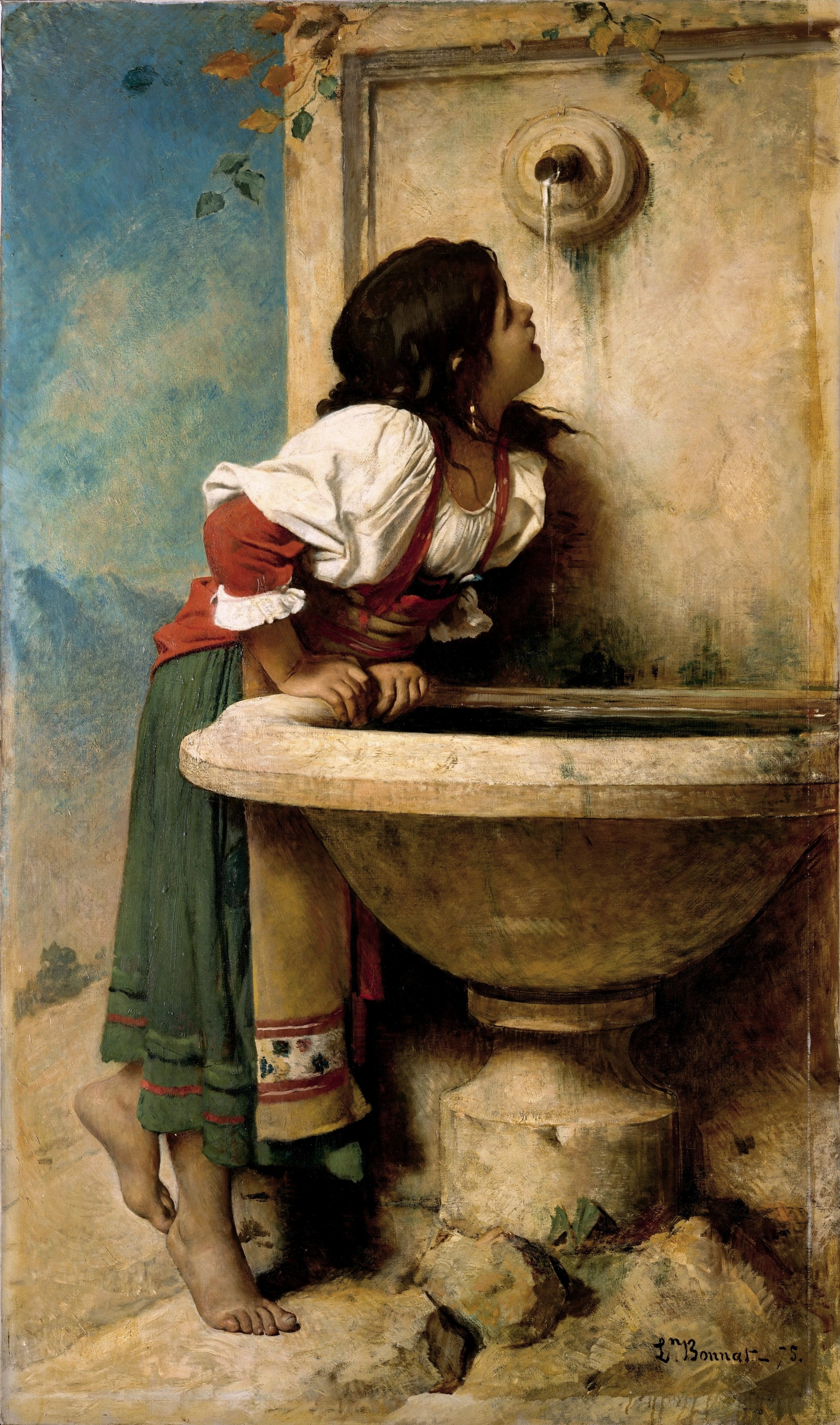
Léon Bonnat, Roman Girl drinking at a Fountain (1875)

Rome’s long-standing tradition of supplying fresh water through public fountains dates back to antiquity, when aqueducts fed hundreds of public basins (lacus) across the city.

The city of Rome began installing nasoni in the 1870s to provide a water supply for citizens. The exact year is not known: sources note both 1872 and 1874 as the first time a nasone was installed. The fountains' design went unchanged for decades. At the peak of their popularity, there were approximately 5,000 nasoni in Rome. While their number has dwindled as domestic water connections have become commonplace, there are still between 2,500 and 2,800 nasoni in greater Rome today, one tenth of them in the historical center.

Acea, the company responsible for maintaining the city's water supply, installed ten casa dell'acqua (lit. "house of the water") kiosks in 2015. Described as "hi-tech nasoni", these provide free tap and sparkling water as well as information for tourists and a place to recharge mobile devices.

== Benefits ==
Aside from the social-welfare benefits of supplying drinkable water to citizens (especially those without their own access), nasoni serve as needed ventilation valves for the Roman water-supply system. In addition, constantly flowing water keeps the water in the pipes from stagnating, which might otherwise allow bacteria to proliferate. While this has been criticized by some as a waste of drinking water, only 1% of the water is lost because of the nasoni running continuously, compared to nearly 50% of water lost due to old and leaky pipes. According to estimates, operating a nasone costs the city of Rome approximately 3–5 Euro per day, depending on the strength of the water flow.

== Shut-offs ==
In July 2017, Acea began to shut off some nasoni because drought had diminished the nearby Lake Bracciano, the city's main water reserve. The move was criticized from multiple quarters in Rome, citing concerns that the decision will be hurtful to Rome's homeless population and local animals, both of which rely on fresh water from these fountains.

== Variants ==
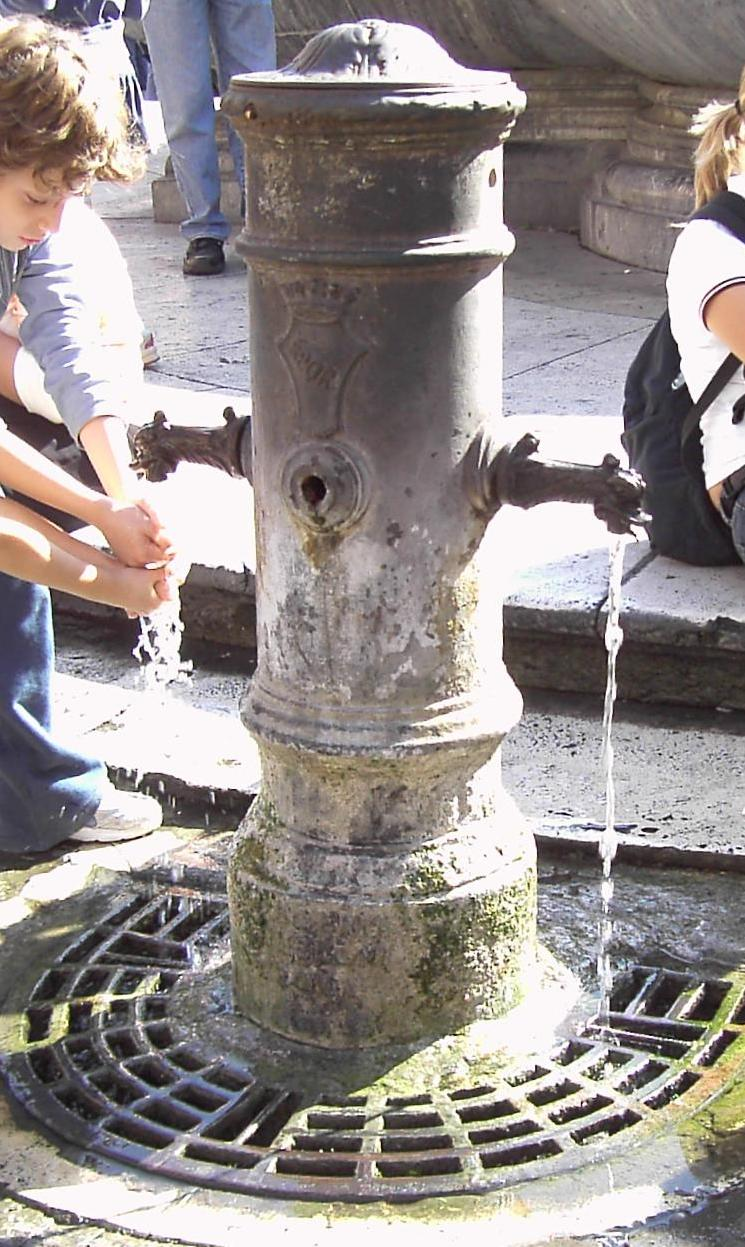
Nasone with two animal-heads as spouts on Piazza della Rotonda

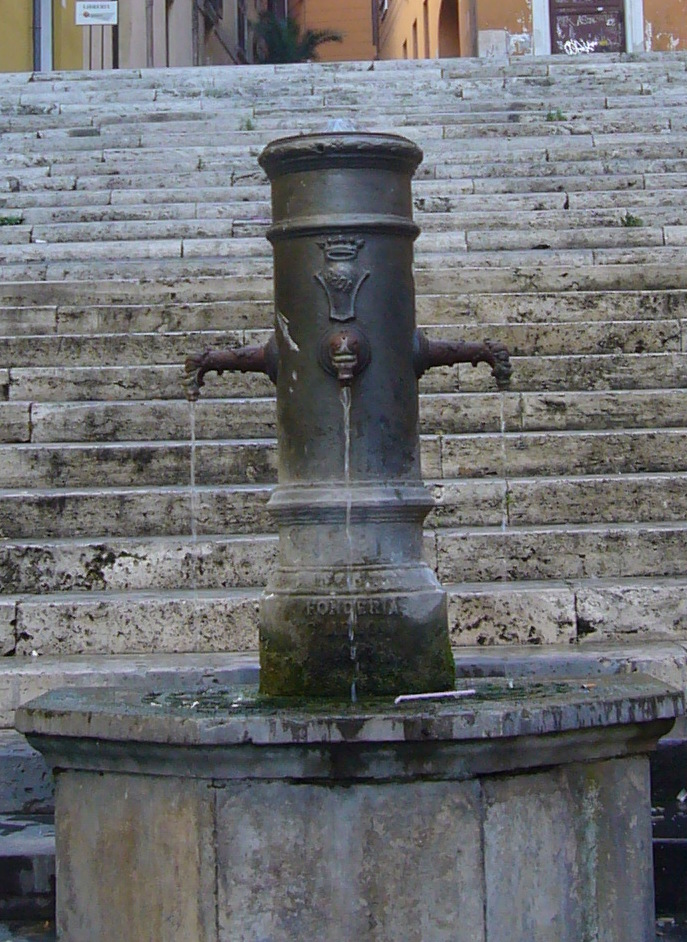
Fontana Delle Tre Cannelle (lit. "fountain of the three spouts") in Via Della Cordonata

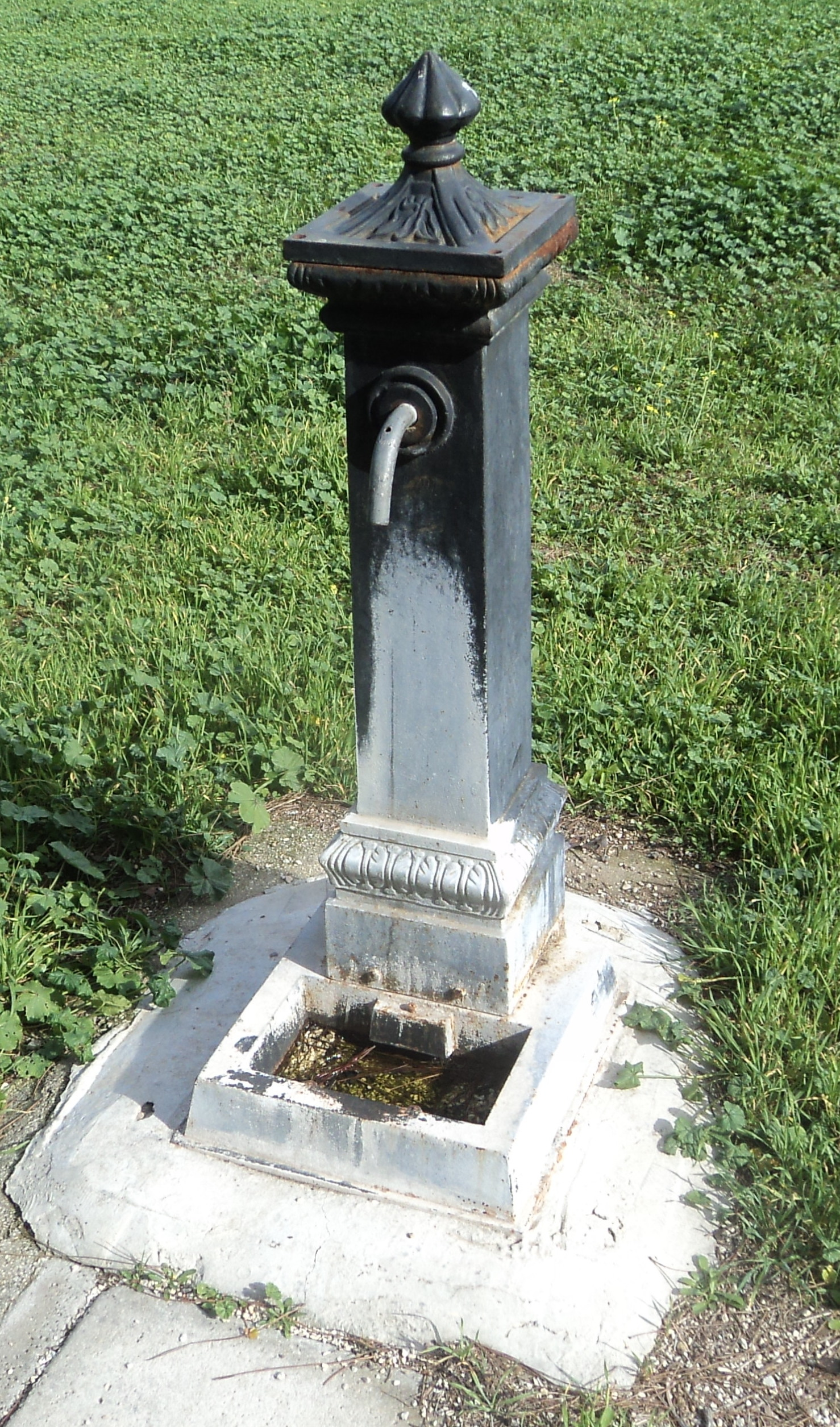
Square nasone in Parco Caduti di Marcinelle

Casa Dell'Acqua water dispenser located outside Rome Termini station

== See also ==
- List of fountains in Rome
- Toret

Preceded by Fontana del Moro	Landmarks of Rome; Nasone	Succeeded by Fontana della Navicella, Rome
