= Drinking fountain =

Fountain designed to provide drinking water

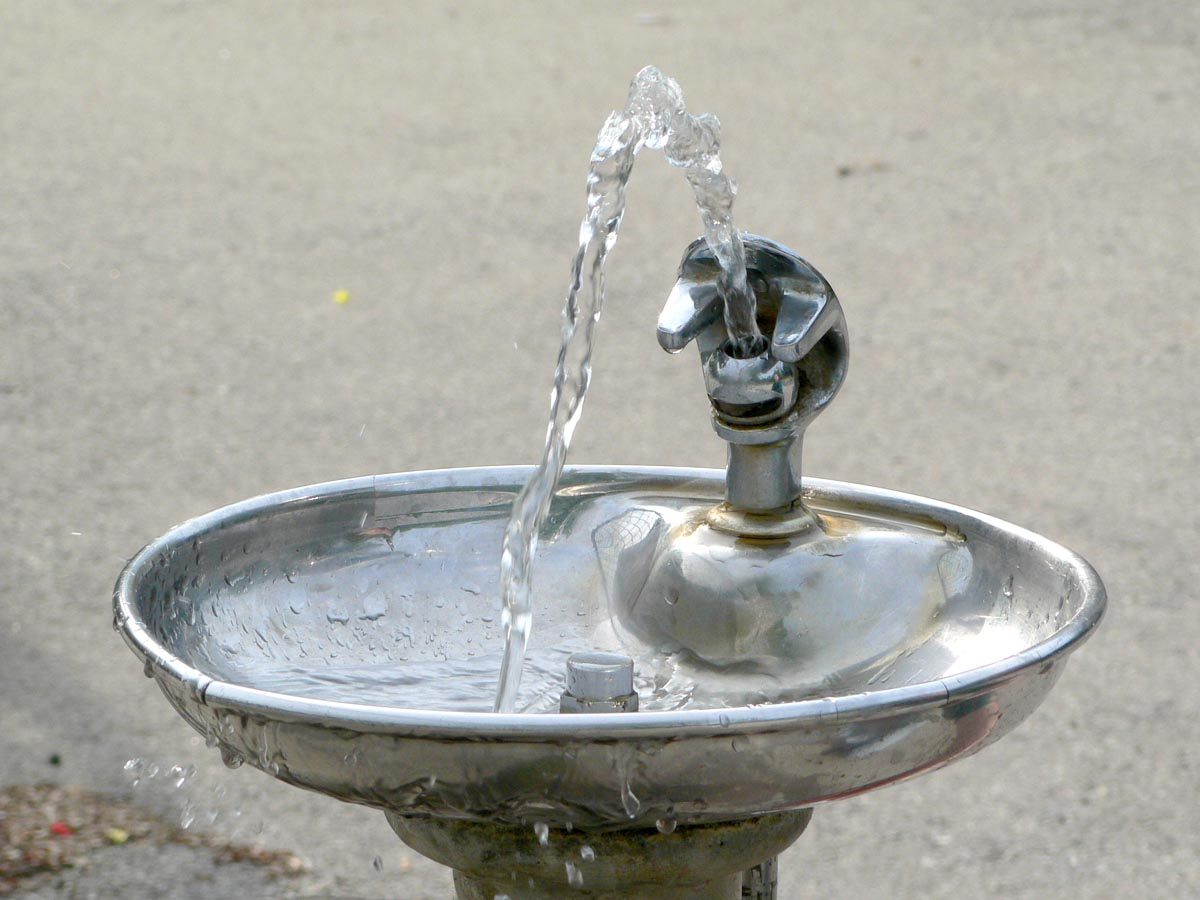
A typical drinking fountain

A drinking fountain, also called a water fountain or bubbler, is a fountain designed to provide drinking water. It consists of a basin with either continuously running water or a tap. The drinker bends down to the stream of water and swallows water directly from the stream. Modern indoor drinking fountains may incorporate filters to remove impurities from the water and chillers to lower its temperature. Drinking fountains are usually found in public places, like schools, rest areas, libraries, and grocery stores.

Drinking fountains are an important source of clean water in urban infrastructure. Many jurisdictions require drinking fountains to be wheelchair accessible (by sticking out horizontally from the wall), and to include an additional unit of a lower height for children and short adults. The design that this replaced often had one spout atop a refrigeration unit.

== History ==
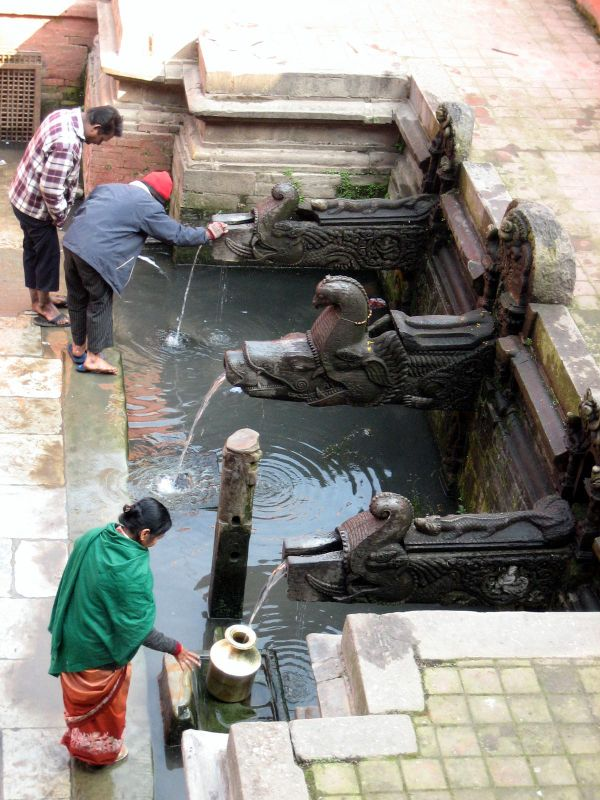
In 2026, people are still using this drinking fountain built in 570 AD called Manga Hiti in Lalitpur, Nepal

Before potable water was provided in private homes, water for drinking was made available to citizens of cities through access to public fountains. Many of these early public drinking fountains can still be seen (and used) in cities such as Rome, with its many fontanelle and nasoni (big noses).

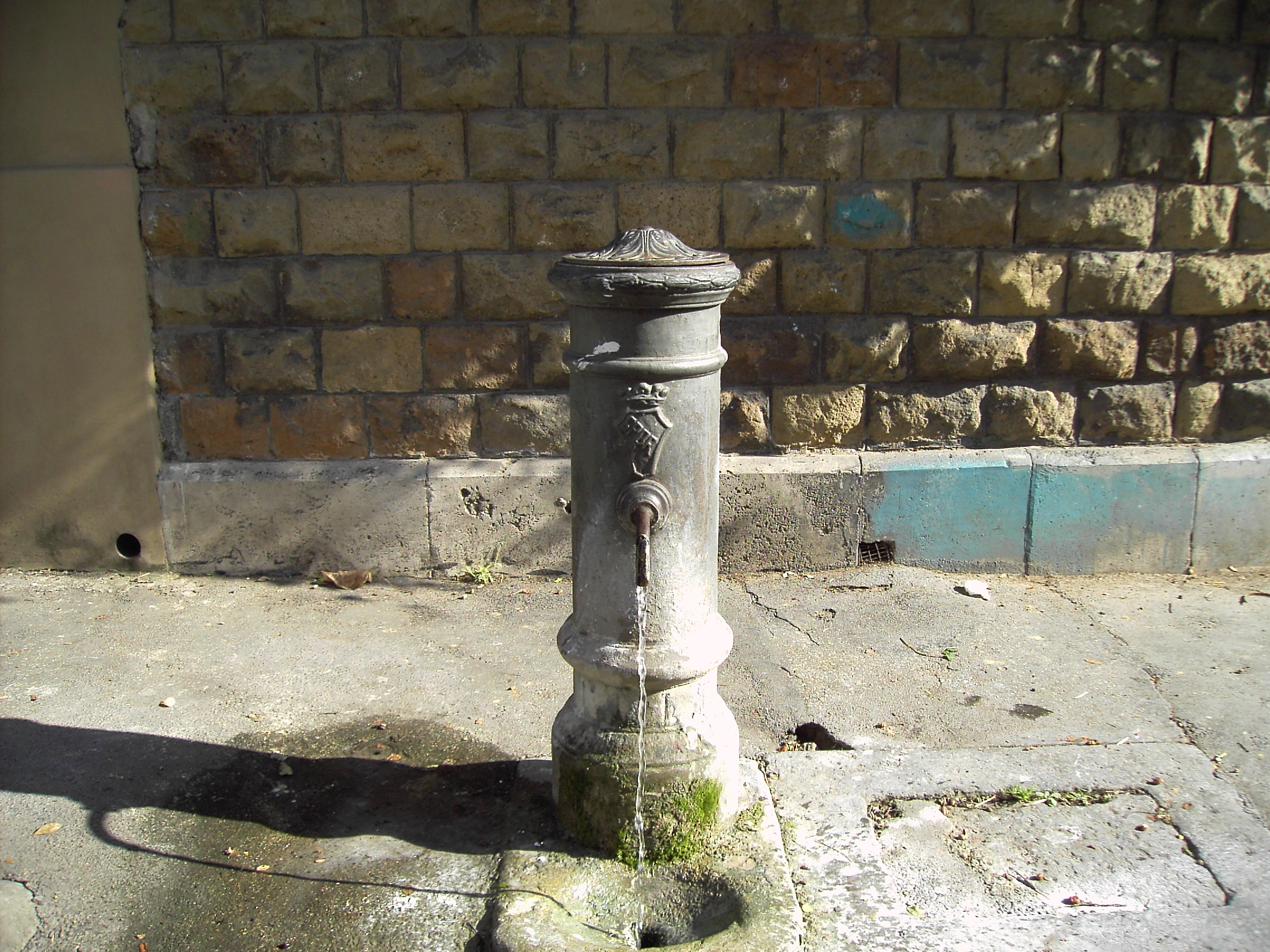
The typical drinking fountain in Rome, called nasone

=== Nepal ===
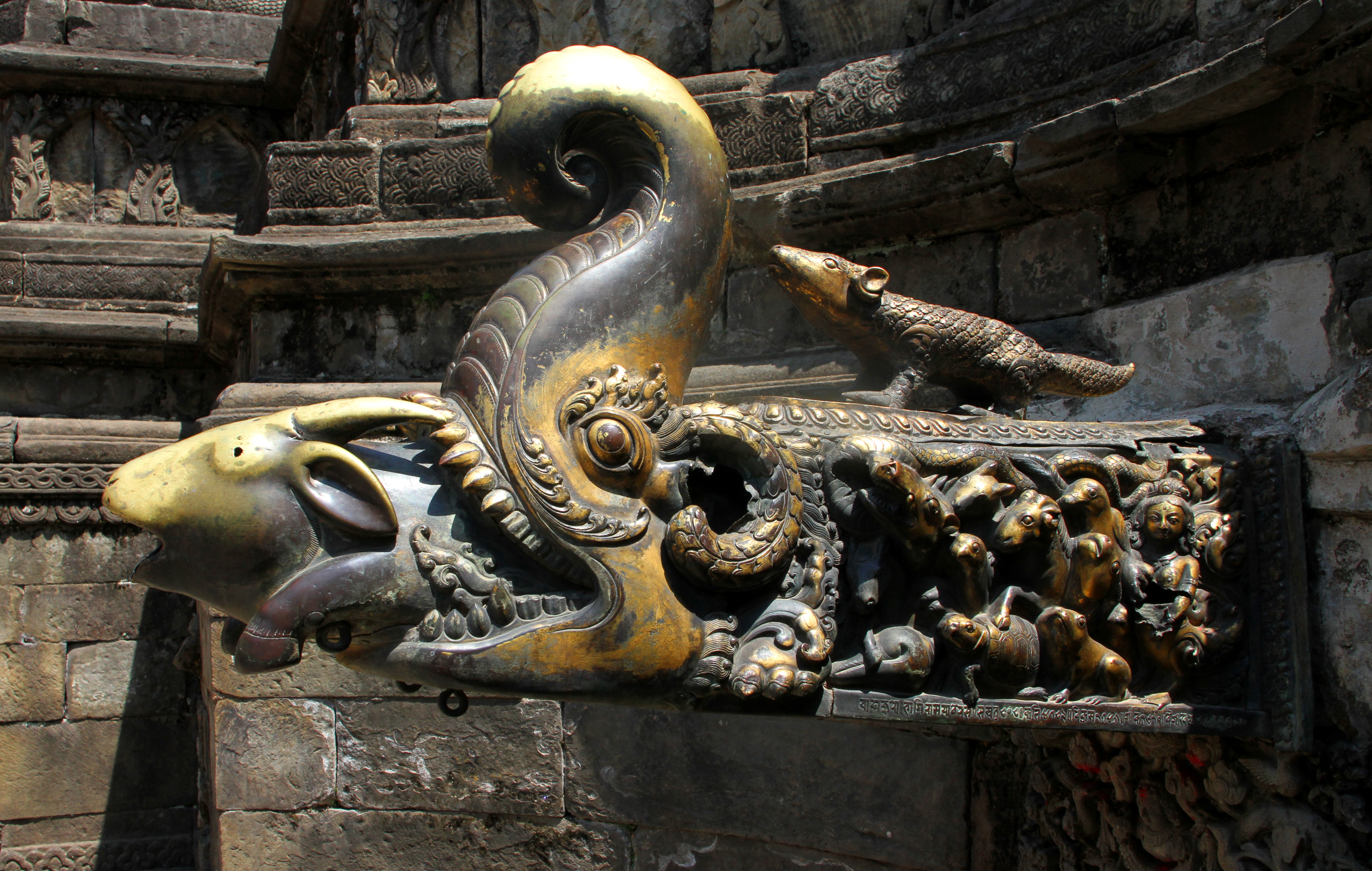
Ancient dhunge dhara (drinking fountain) of Bhaktapur

In Nepal there were public drinking fountains at least as early as 550 AD. They are called dhunge dharas or hitis. They consist of carved stone spouts through which water flows uninterrupted from underground sources. They are found extensively in Nepal and some of them are still operational. Many people of Nepal rely on them for their daily water supply. The tutedhara or jahru is another type of old drinking fountain found in Nepal. This is a stone container that can be filled with water and has a tap that can be opened and closed. The oldest of these is dated 530 AD. Very few jahrus are in use today, but the remnants can be found in many places.

=== United Kingdom ===
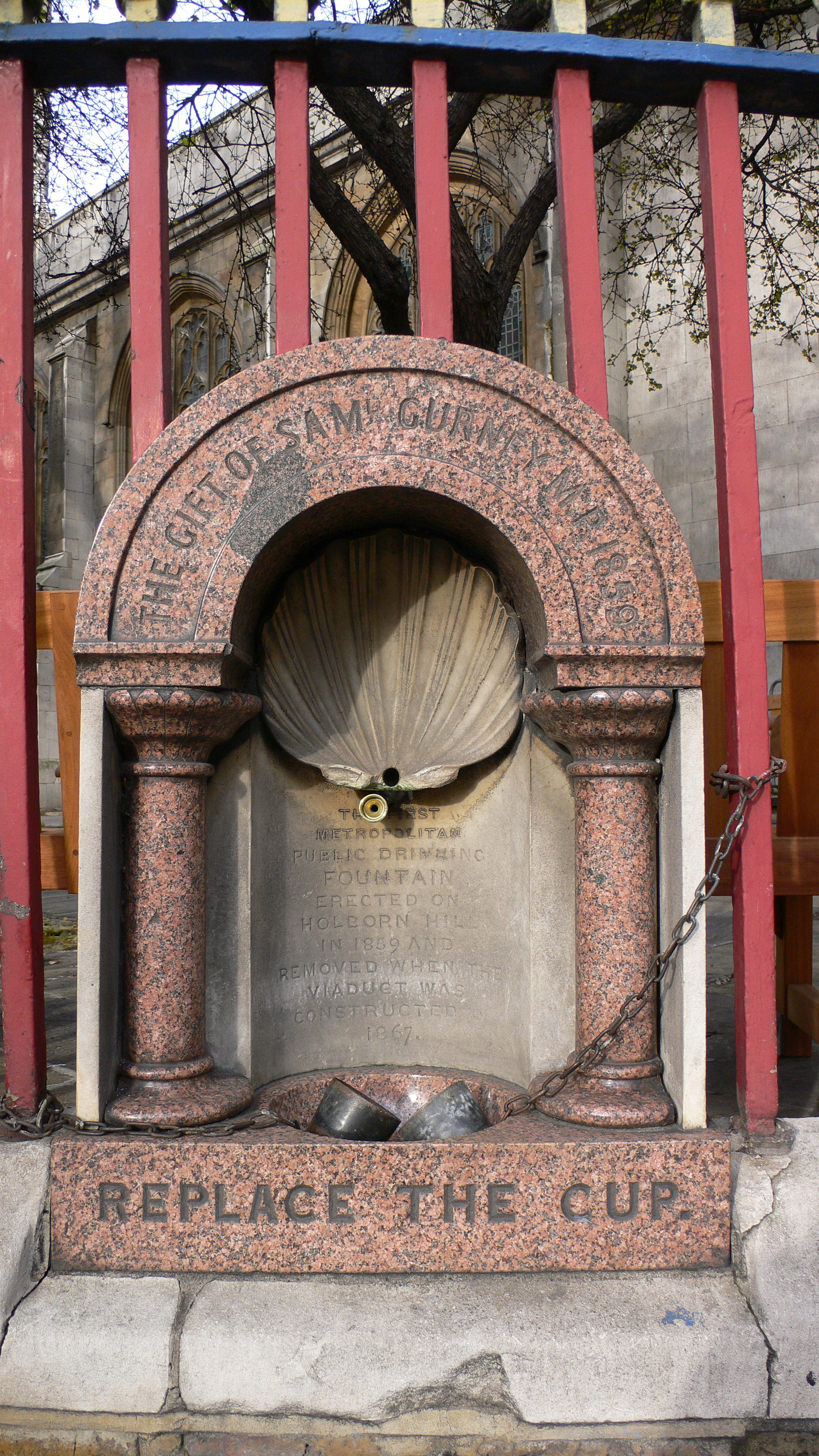
First fountain installed in London by the Metropolitan Free Drinking Fountain Association

In mid-19th century London, when water provision from private water companies was generally inadequate for the rapidly growing population and was often contaminated, a new law created the Metropolitan Commission of Sewers, made water filtration compulsory, and moved water intakes on the Thames above the sewage outlets. In this context, the public drinking fountain movement began. It built the first public baths and public drinking fountains.

In 1859 the Metropolitan Free Drinking Fountain Association was established. The first fountain was built on Holborn Hill on the railings of the church of St Sepulchre-without-Newgate on Snow Hill, paid for by Samuel Gurney, and opened on 21 April 1859.

The fountain became immediately popular, and was used by 7,000 people a day. In the next six years 85 fountains were built, with much of the funding coming directly from the association. The provision of drinking fountains in the United Kingdom soon became linked to the temperance movement; the same association in London drew support from temperance advocates. Many of its fountains were sited opposite public houses. The evangelical movement was encouraged to build fountains in churchyards to encourage the poor to see churches as supporting them. Many fountains have inscriptions such as "Jesus said whosoever drinketh of this water shall thirst again but whosoever drinketh of the water I shall give him shall never thirst". By 1877, the association was widely accepted and Queen Victoria donated money for a fountain in Esher. Many fountains, within London and outside, were called temperance fountains or would have a representation of the Greek mythical figure Temperance.

=== France ===
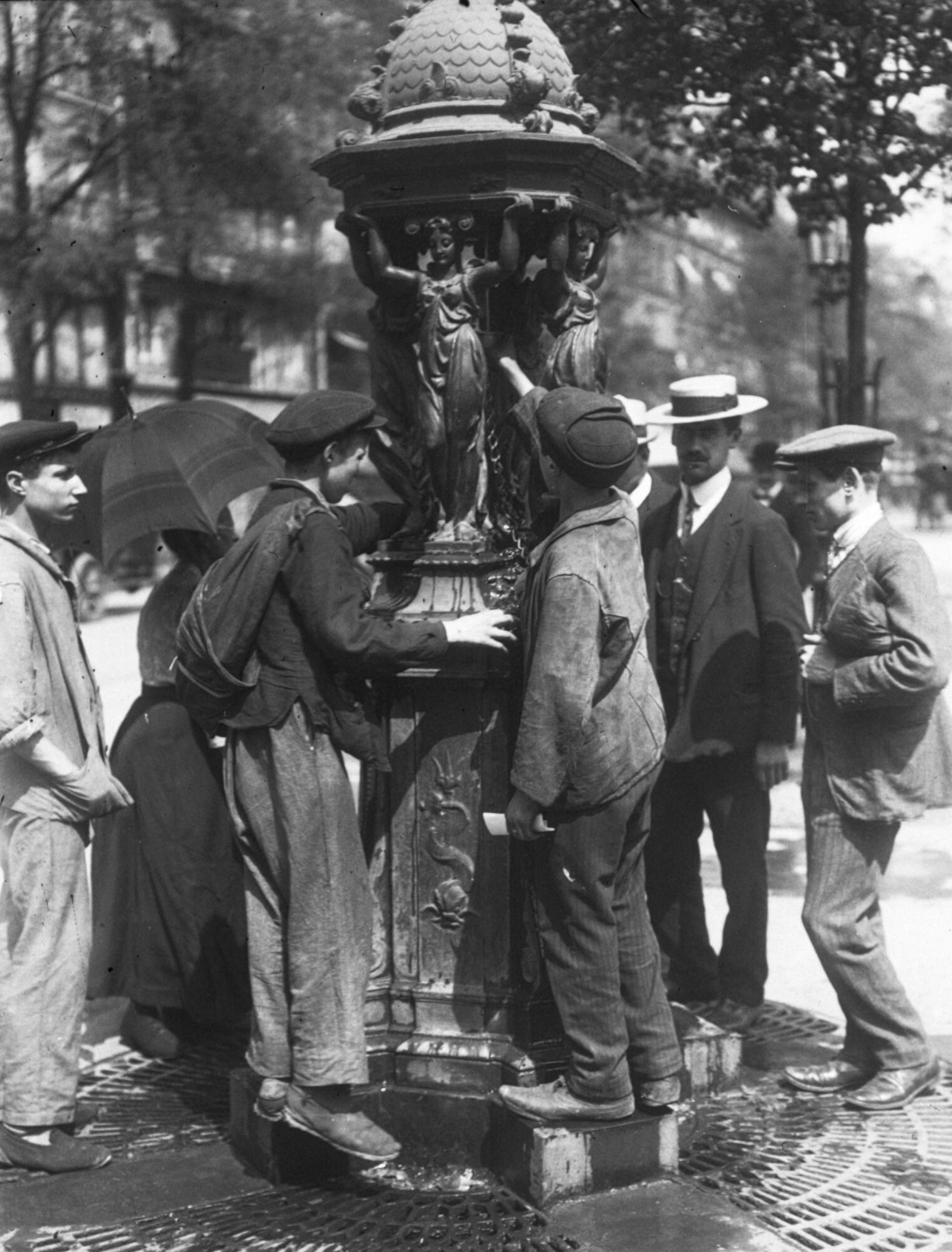
People drinking from a Wallace fountain during Bastille Day celebrations in 1911

After many of the aqueducts were destroyed after the siege of Paris in the 1870s, the Parisian poor had no access to fresh water. Richard Wallace, an Englishman, used the money from an inheritance to fund the construction of 50 drinking fountains (ever after known as ‘Wallace fountains’). Designed by Charles-Auguste Lebourg with four caryatids atop a green cylindrical base, these fountains have become iconic symbols of Paris.

=== United States ===
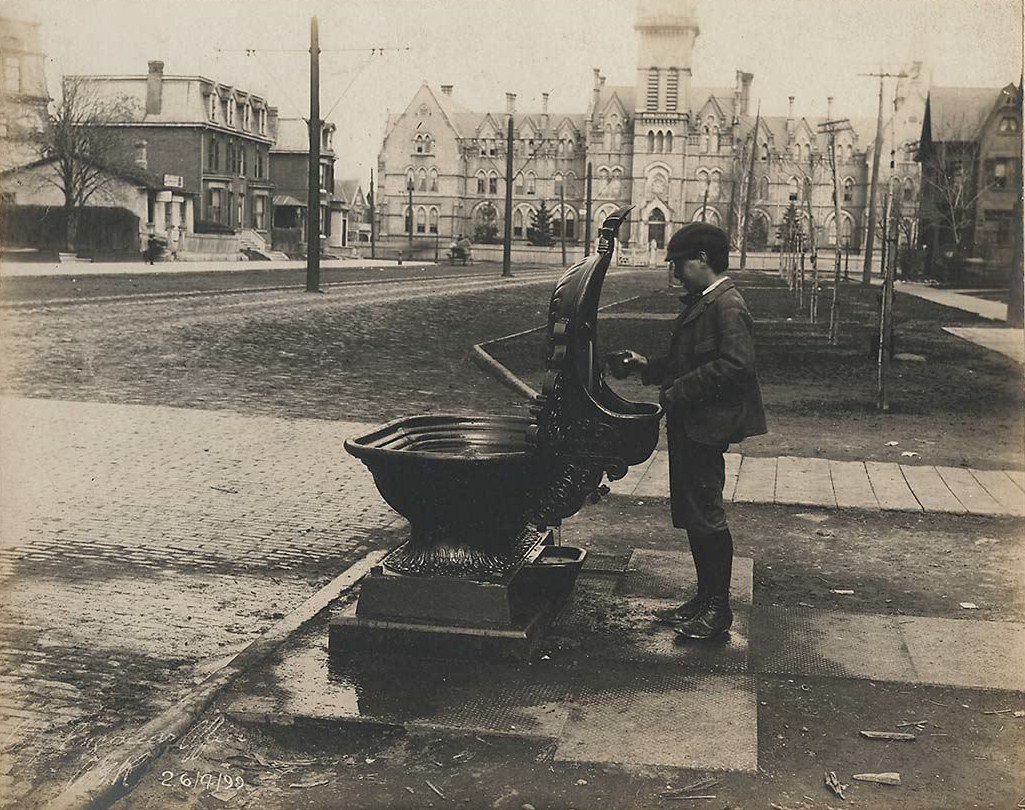
Combined drinking fountain for people, horses and dogs, Toronto, Canada, 1899

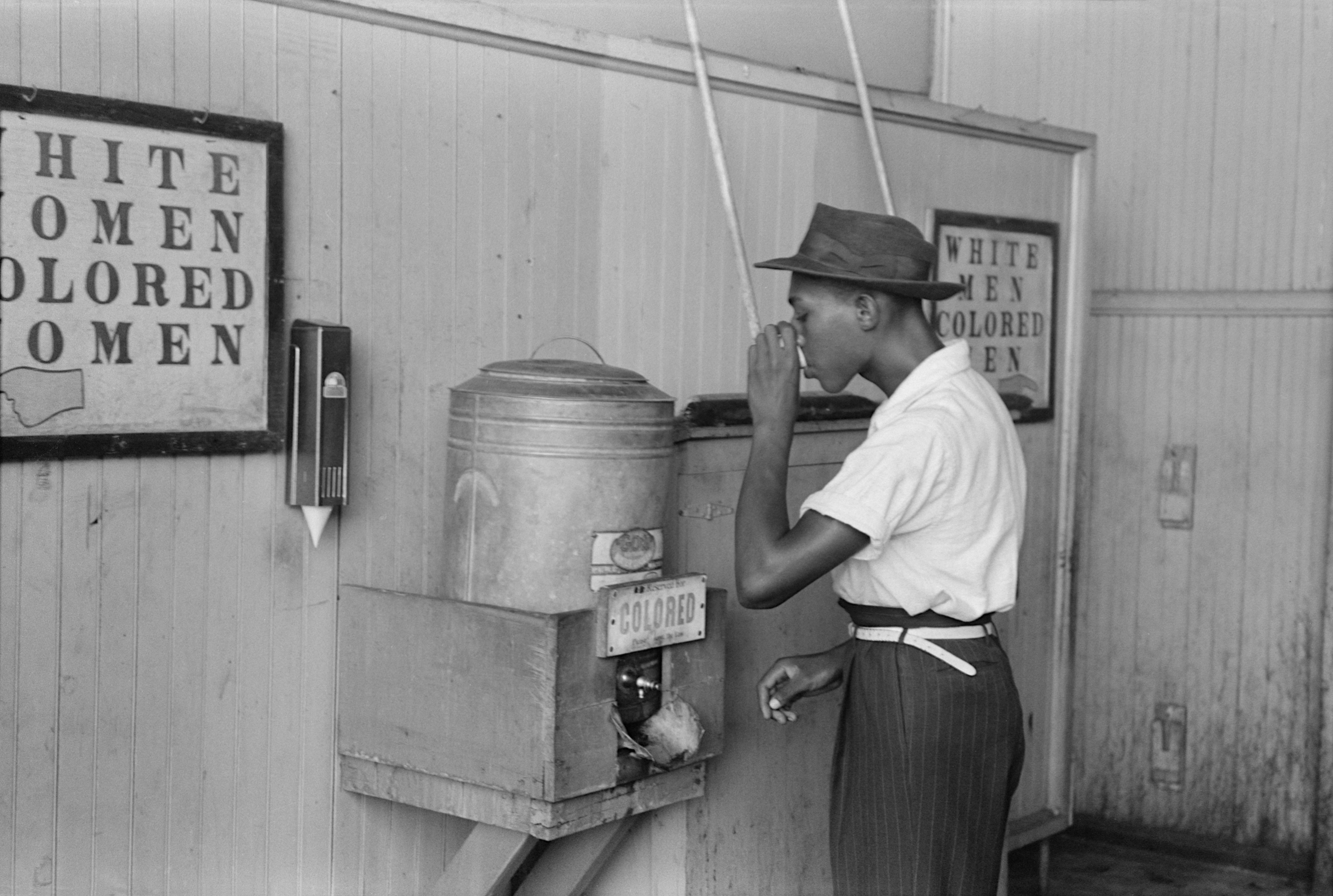
An African-American man drinking at a "colored" drinking fountain in a streetcar terminal in Oklahoma City, 1939.

Muddied and bad tasting drinking water encouraged many Americans to drink alcohol for health purposes, so temperance groups constructed public drinking fountains throughout the United States following the Civil War. The National Woman's Christian Temperance Union (NWCTU)'s organizing convention of 1874 encouraged its attendees to erect the fountains in their hometowns, as a means to discourage people from drinking in saloons. They sponsored temperance fountains in towns and cities across the United States.

The American Society for the Prevention of Cruelty to Animals, founded in 1866, expressed concern about the difficulty of finding fresh water for work horses in urban areas. Combined drinking fountains with a bubbler for people, a water trough for horses and sometimes a lower basin for dogs, became popular. In particular, over 120 National Humane Alliance fountains were donated to communities across the United States between 1903 and 1913.

The original 'Bubbler' shot water one inch straight into the air, and the excess water ran back down over the sides of the nozzle. During World War I, company founder Halsey W. Taylor invented the "Double Bubbler" drinking fountain. This fountain dispensed two streams of water in an arc. Several years later the Bubbler adopted this more sanitary arc projection, which also allowed the user to drink more easily from it. At the start of the 20th century, it was discovered that the original vertical design was related to the spread of contagious diseases.

In the United States, segregation of public facilities including but not limited to water fountains due to race, color, religion, or national origin was abolished by the Civil Rights Act of 1964. Prior to this, racially segregated water fountains with those for black people in worse condition than those for white people were common.

== Cleanliness ==
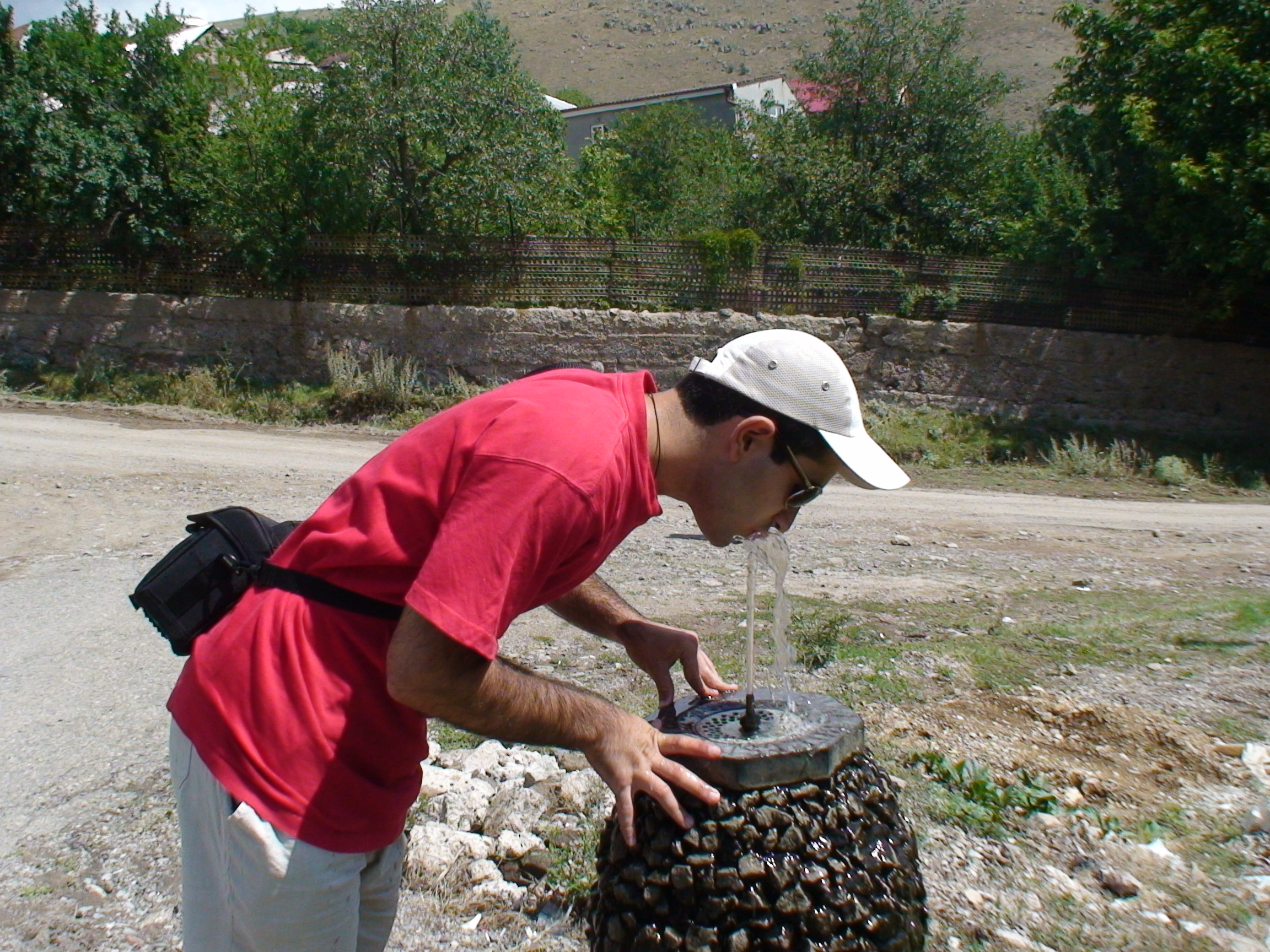
Man drinking from a pulpulak in Armenia. An example of the so-called 'vertical' design

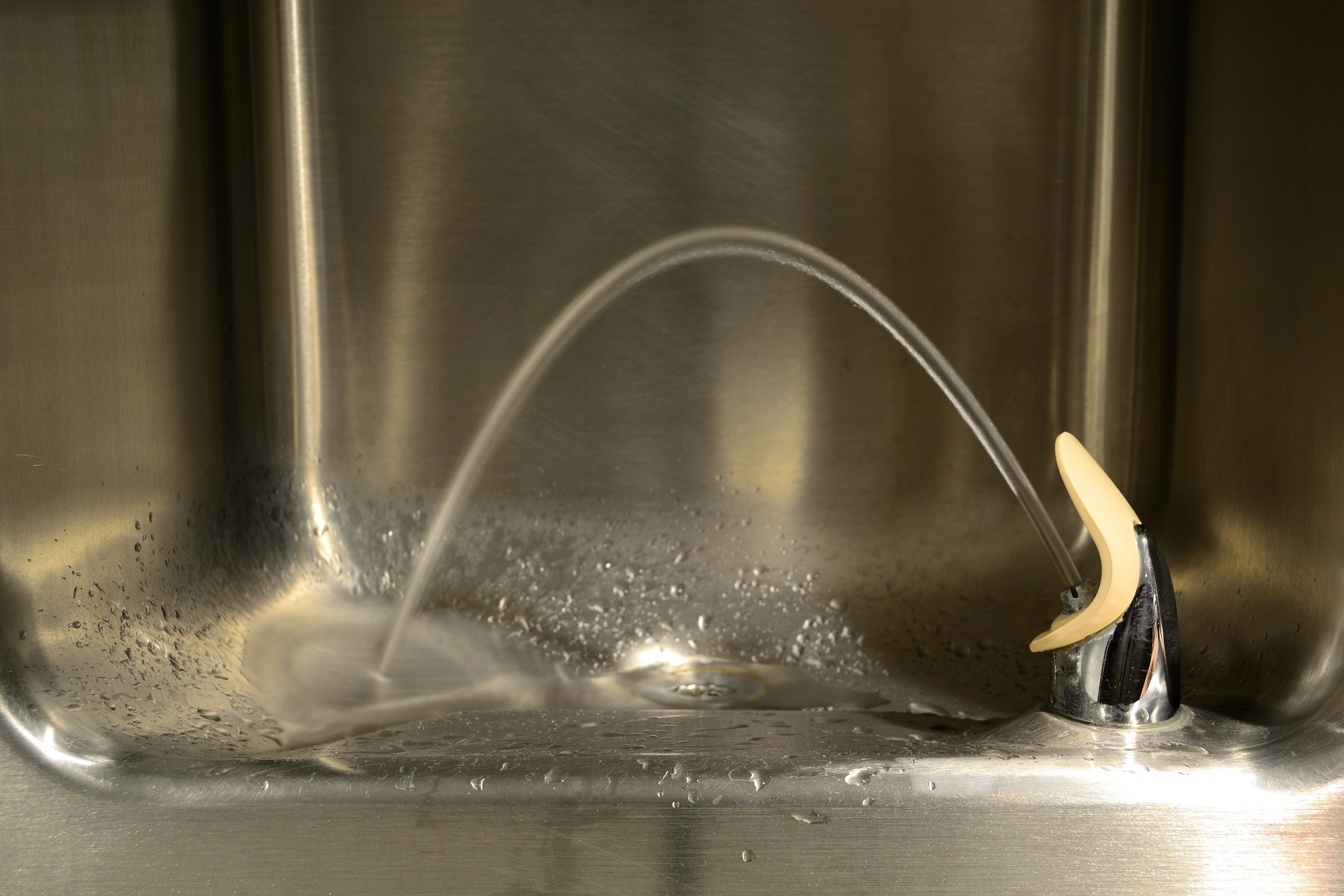
A drinking fountain with a guard to prevent contact between spigot and user's mouth.

In recent studies, it has been found that some drinking fountains have been contaminated with pathogens such as bacteria. In one study, a virus commonly known to cause diarrhea in young children, known as the rotavirus, has been found on drinking fountains in child day care facilities. Due to cases in the past where children have fallen ill due to coliform bacteria poisoning, many governments have placed strict regulations on drinking fountain designs. The vertical spout design is now illegal in most US jurisdictions. Some governments even require water spouts to be as long as four inches to meet health standards. It is also recommended for young children to allow drinking fountains to run before drinking, as the water may also be contaminated with lead. This is especially common in older buildings with obsolete plumbing. In the 1970s, this fear of contamination in tap water was hyped by producers of bottled water, thereby changing attitudes to publicly provided water in drinking fountains, which began to disappear from city streets.

== Terminology ==
The term bubbler is used in some regional dialects of the United States and Australia. A survey of US dialects undertaken between 2002 and 2004 found the word bubbler is commonly used in southern and eastern Wisconsin and in Massachusetts and Rhode Island. The phrase drinking fountain was common in the rest of the inland north and in the west, while water fountain dominated other parts of the country.

The term bubbler is sometimes used in the Portland, Oregon, region where in the early 1900s former Wisconsin resident Simon Benson installed 20 fountains, which are now known in the Portland area as "Benson Bubblers". Currently, there are 52 of these iconic four-bowl drinking fountains still providing free-flowing water in downtown Portland.

In Australia, bubbler is the dominant term used in New South Wales, Queensland and the Northern Territory, whereas in Tasmania, South Australia and Western Australia, the fixtures are most commonly referred to as drinking or water fountains. In Victoria the preferred term is (drinking) tap.

== Frost-resistant drinking fountains ==
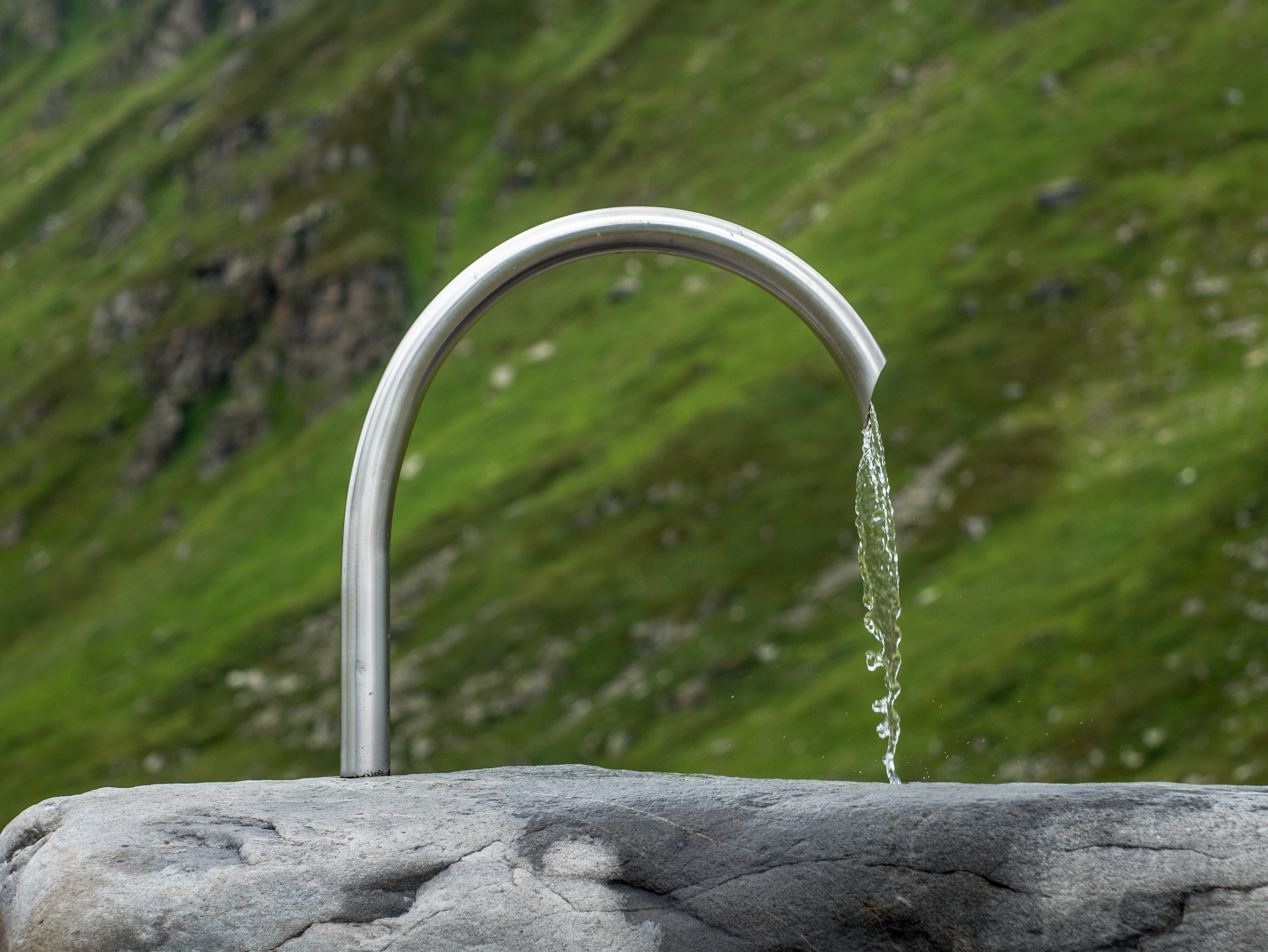
An outdoor fountain at the Barbara Chapel above the Bielerhöhe mountain pass, Vorarlberg, Austria.

Frost-resistant drinking fountains are used outdoors in cold climates and keep the control mechanisms below the frostline resulting in a delay for when water comes out.

== Drinking fountains as public goods ==
Most drinking fountains are freely available, however there are exceptions. Many private individuals in Armenia install pulpulaks (Armenian name for drinking fountain) in their yards or neighborhoods for various reasons, which include honoring dead relatives/friends or giving back to the community.

In Nepal, the construction of water conduits like dhunge dharas, dug wells and tutedharas is considered a pious act. This applies to kings and other dignitaries as well as to ordinary citizens.

Benefits of drinking fountains include increased access to hydration for the public and reduced reliance on single-use plastic bottles. They have also been found to be a benefit for improving public health through broad access to safe water.

== Gallery ==
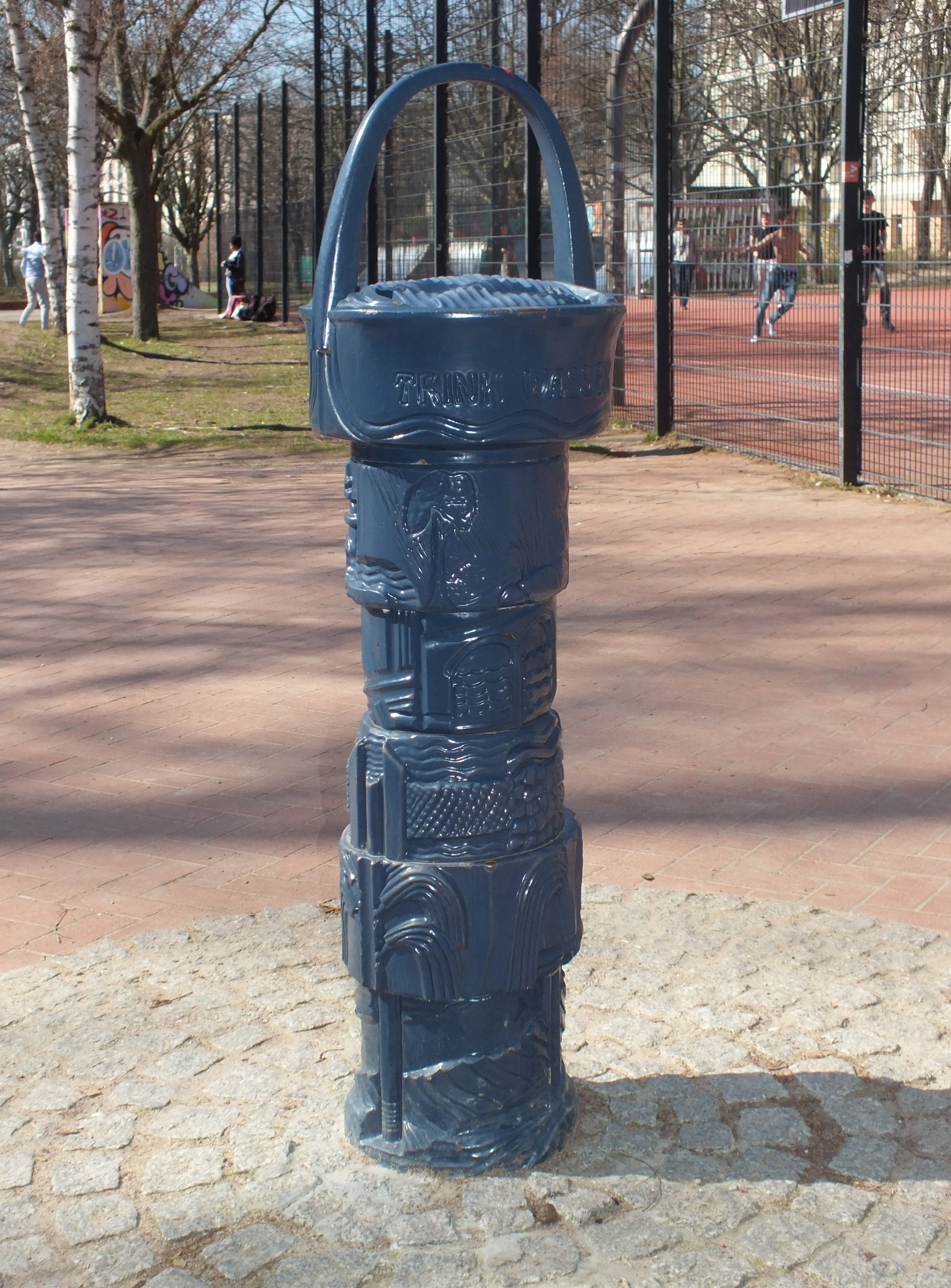
Drinking fountains in Berlin (in German Trinkbrunnen)

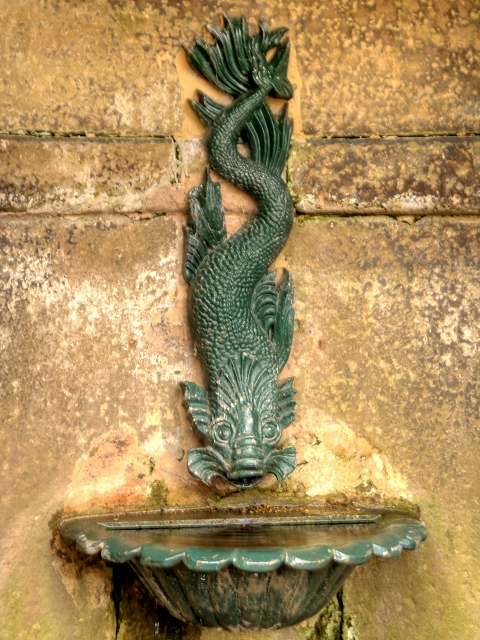
Drinking fountain, Avenham Park, Preston, Lancashire

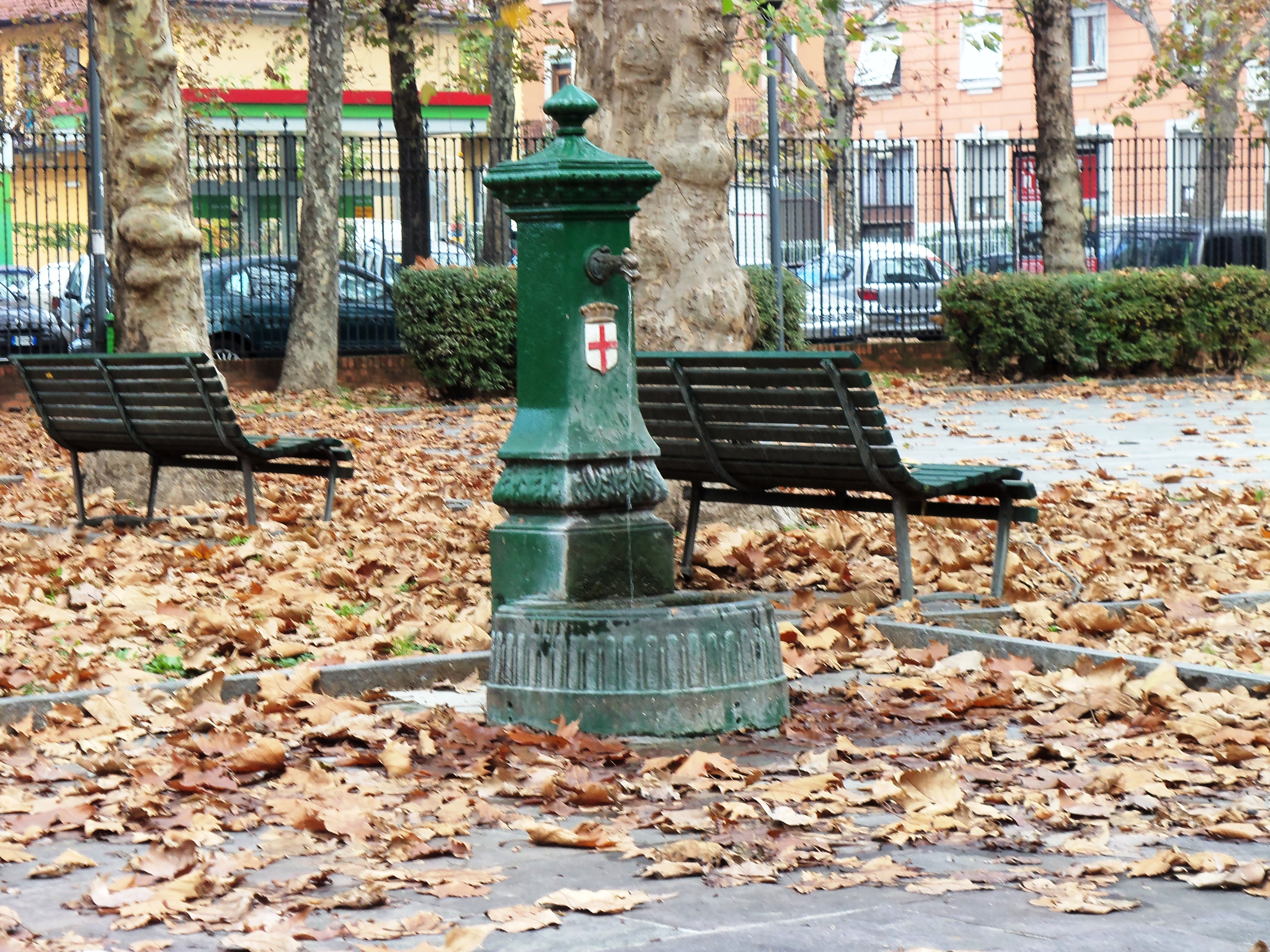
Draghi Verdi (Green Dragons) in Milan, there are 480 of them

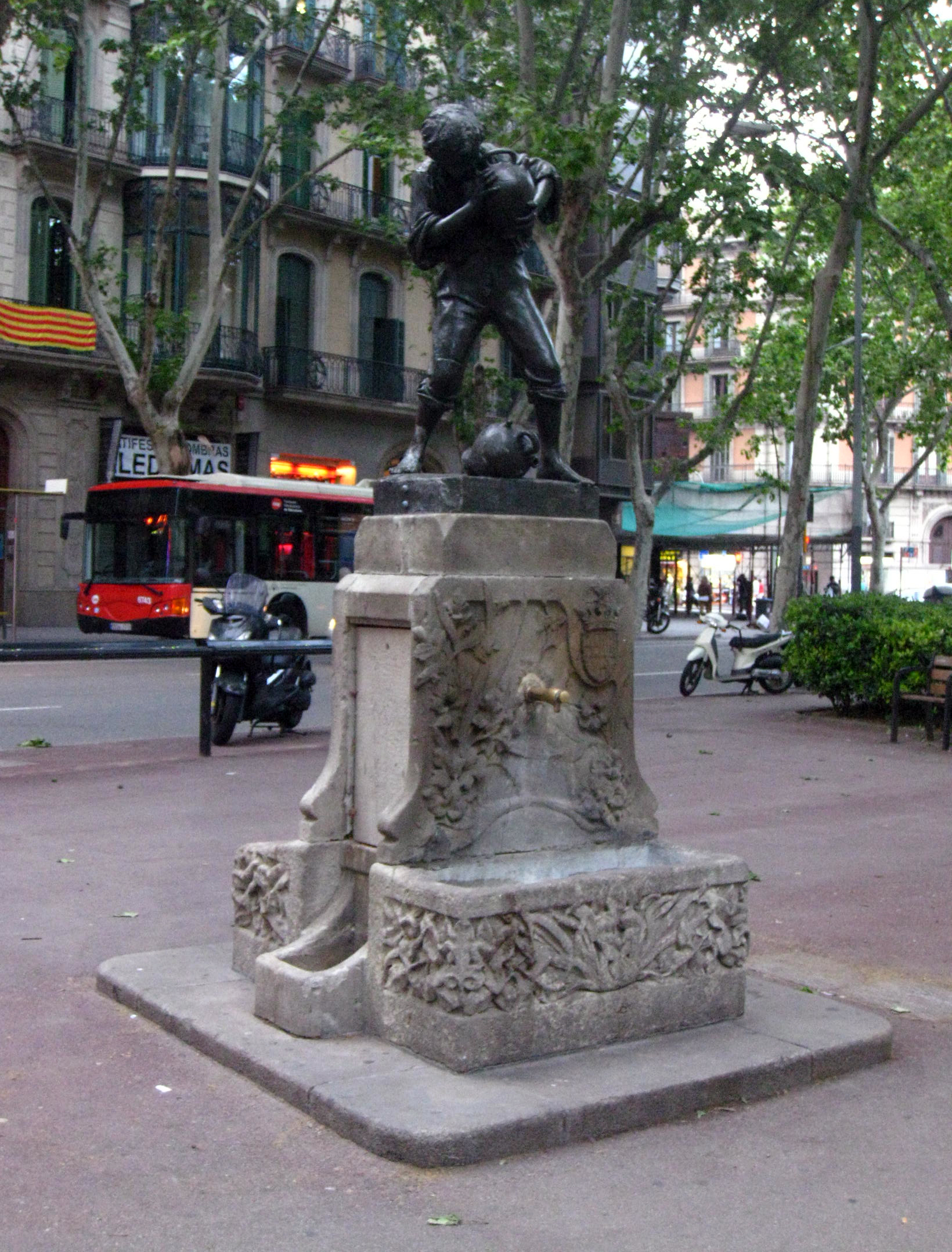
Font del Noi dels Càntirs, Barcelona

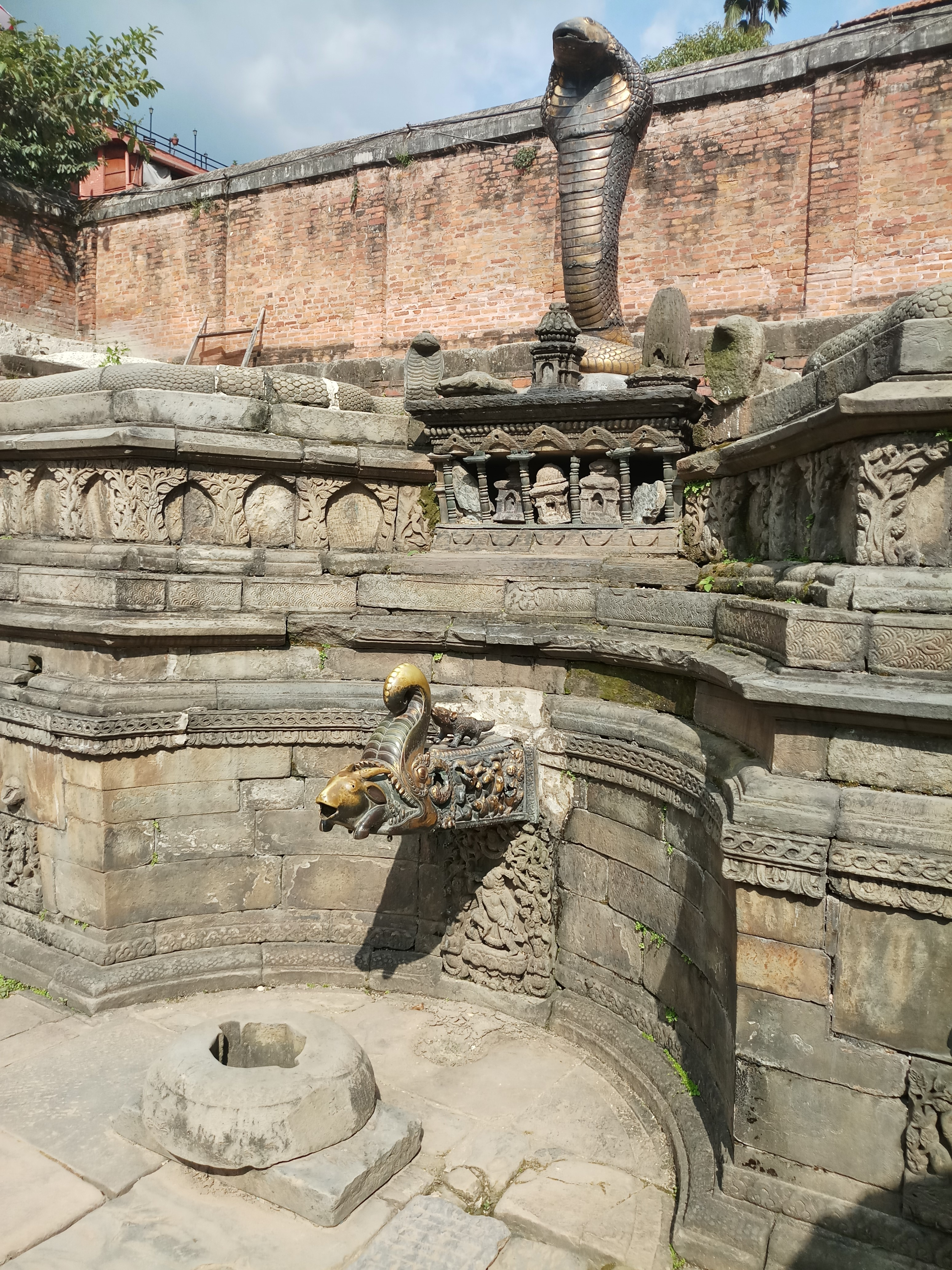
Gilded drinking fountain in Bhaktapur, Nepal

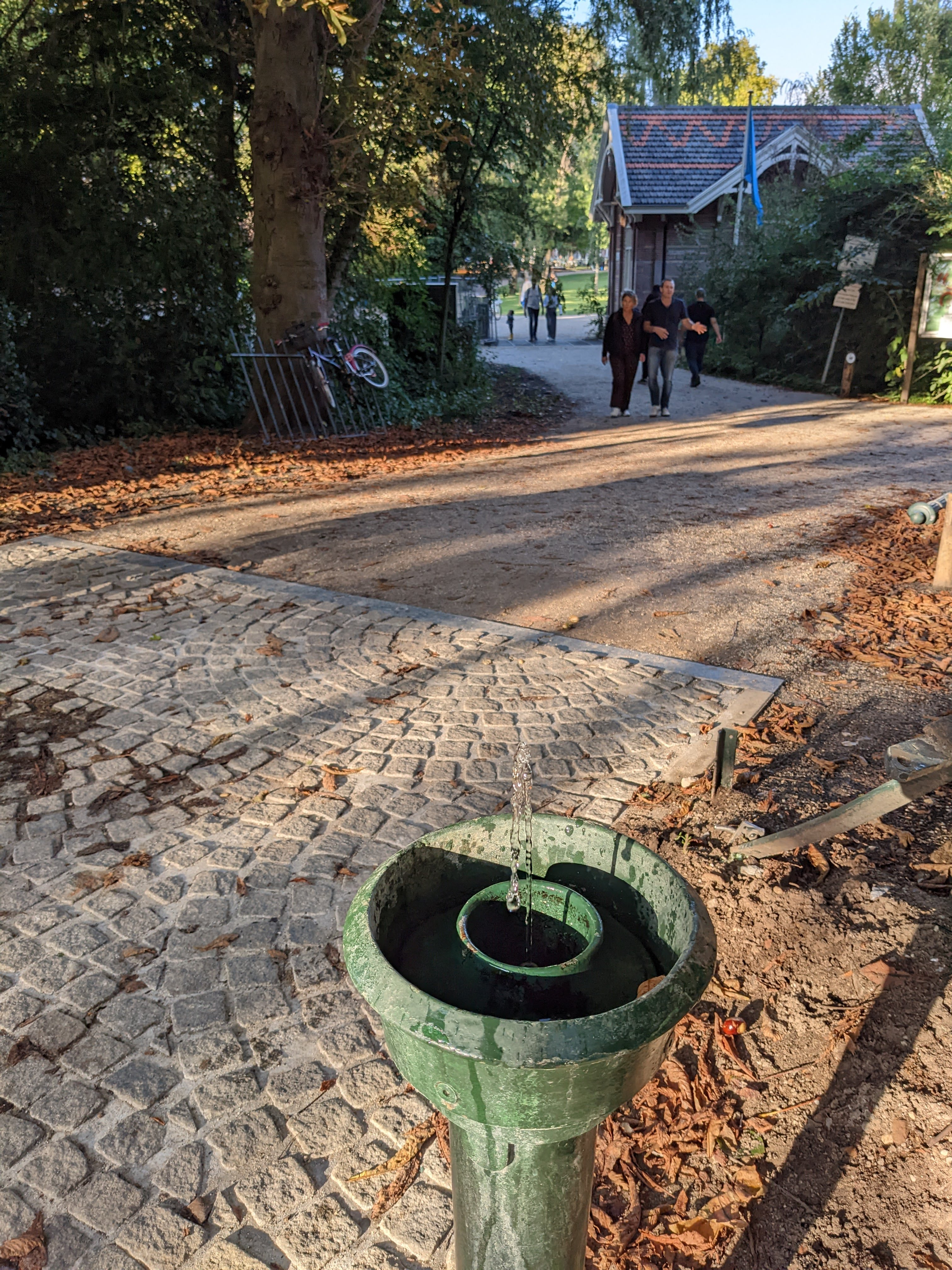
Drinking fountain at the western entrance of Sarphatipark, Amsterdam

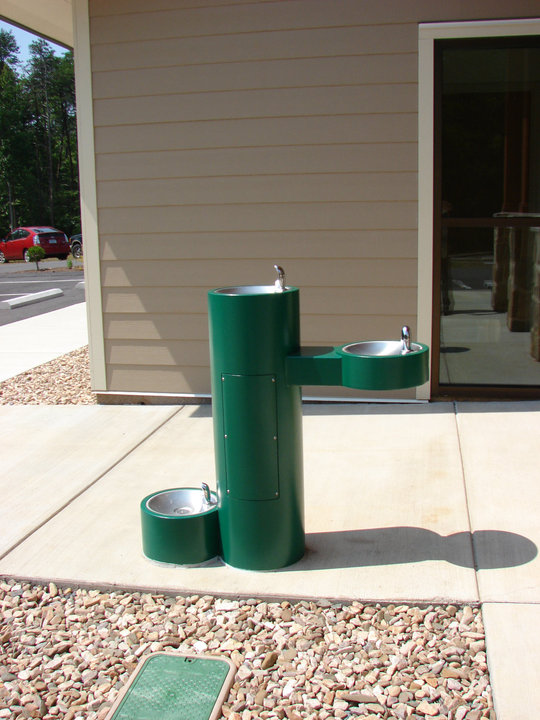
A drinking fountain with different levels for adults, youth and dogs

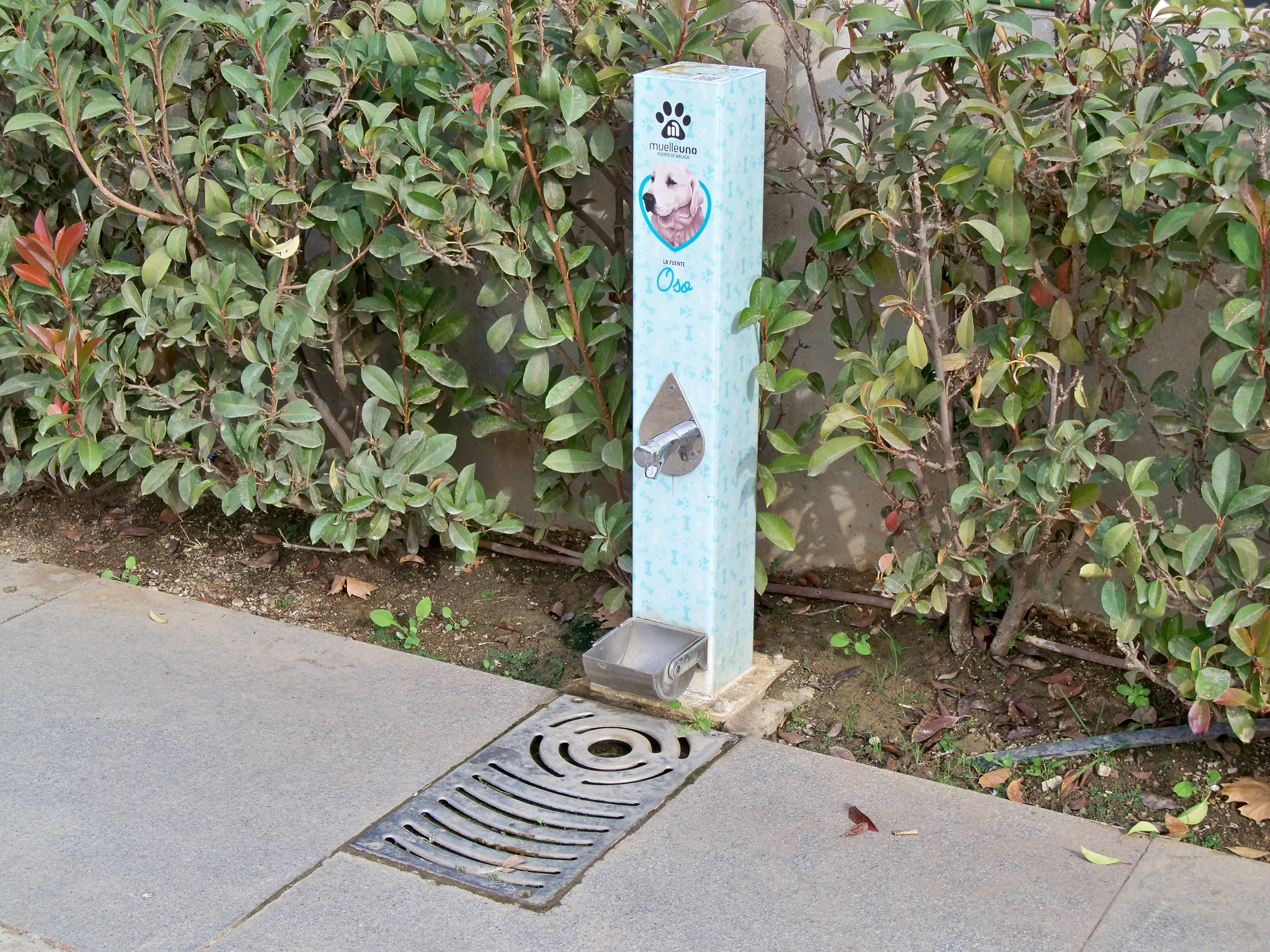
A drinking fountain for dogs, Spain, 2022

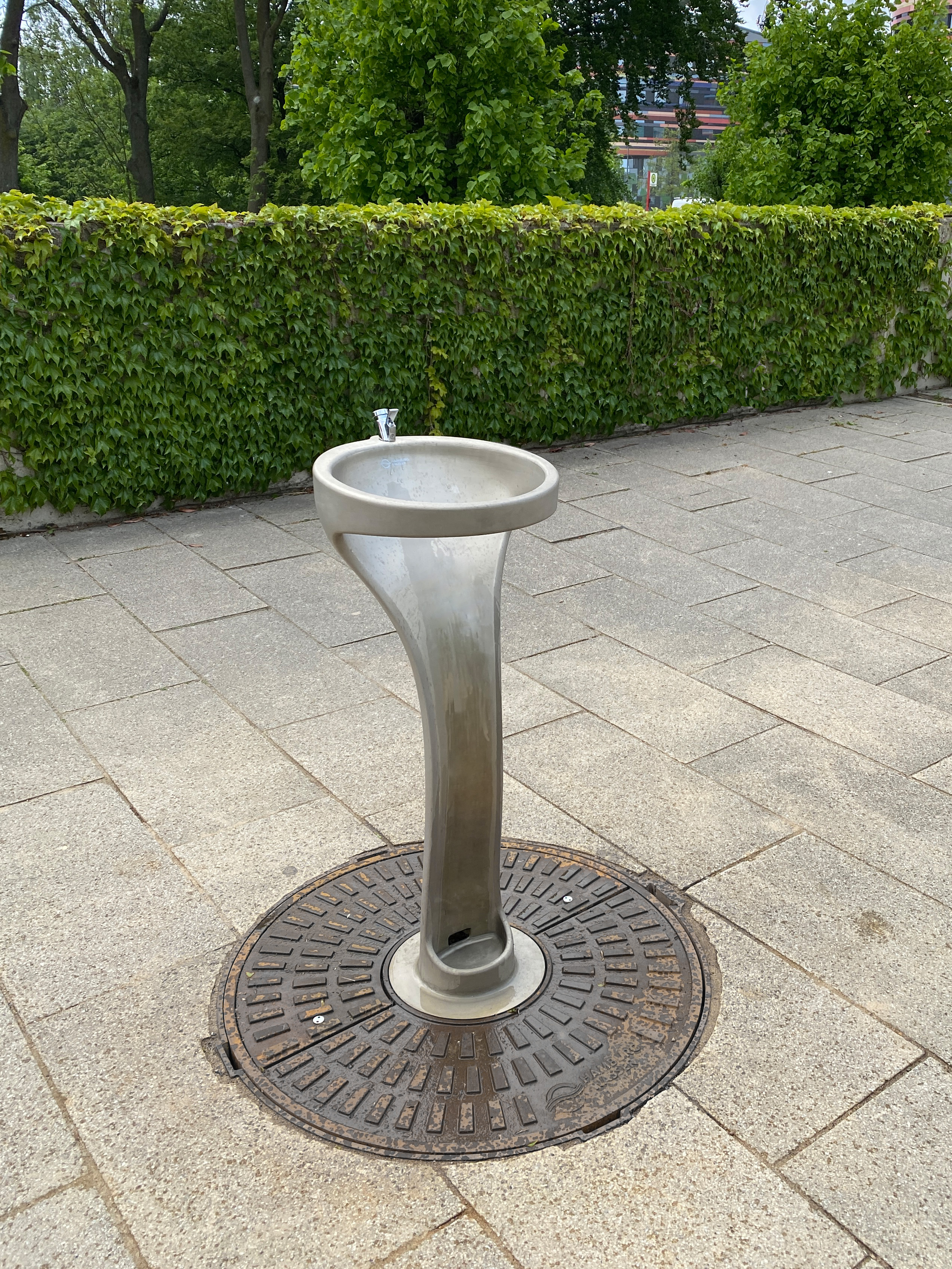
Drinking fountain Hamburg, 2023

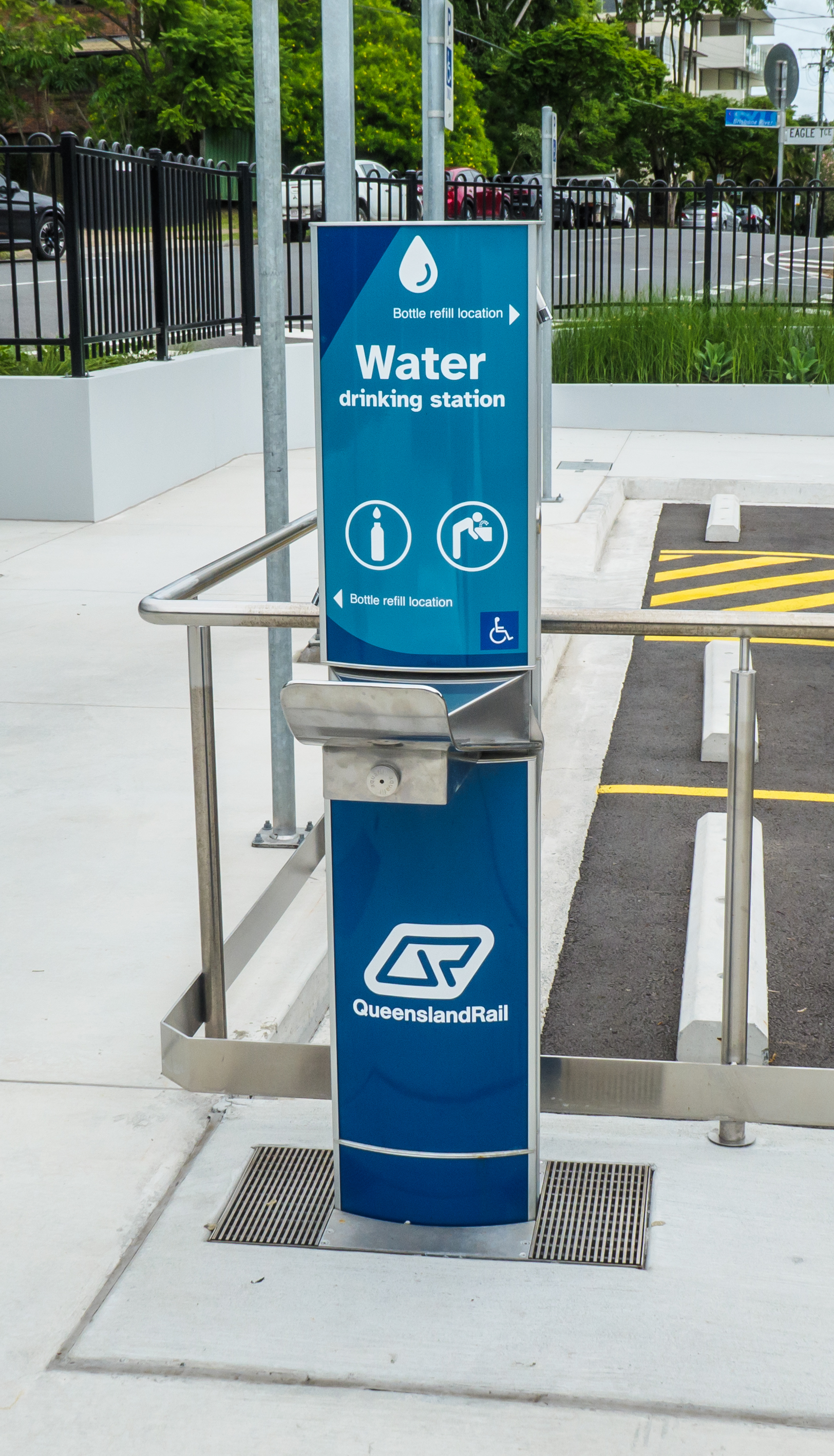
A water drinking station and bottle refill location in Australia, 2024

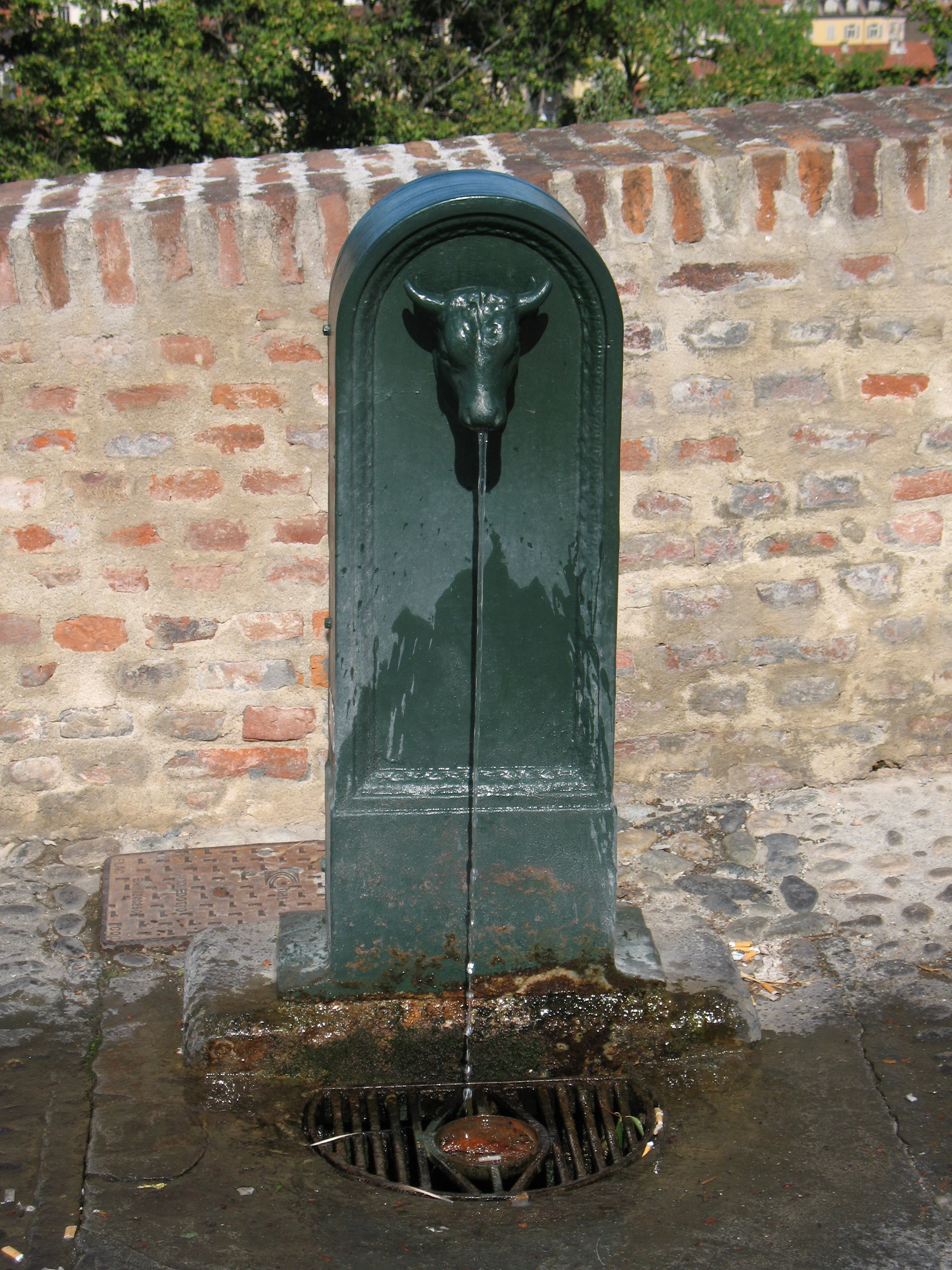
A toret drinking fountain at Monte dei Cappuccini in Turin.

== See also ==
- Benson Bubbler
- Dhunge dhara
- Human right to water and sanitation
- Nasone
- Pulpulak
- Temperance fountain
- Toret
- Tutedhara
- Water dispenser
