= Catholic temperance movement =

Social movement in Catholic societies

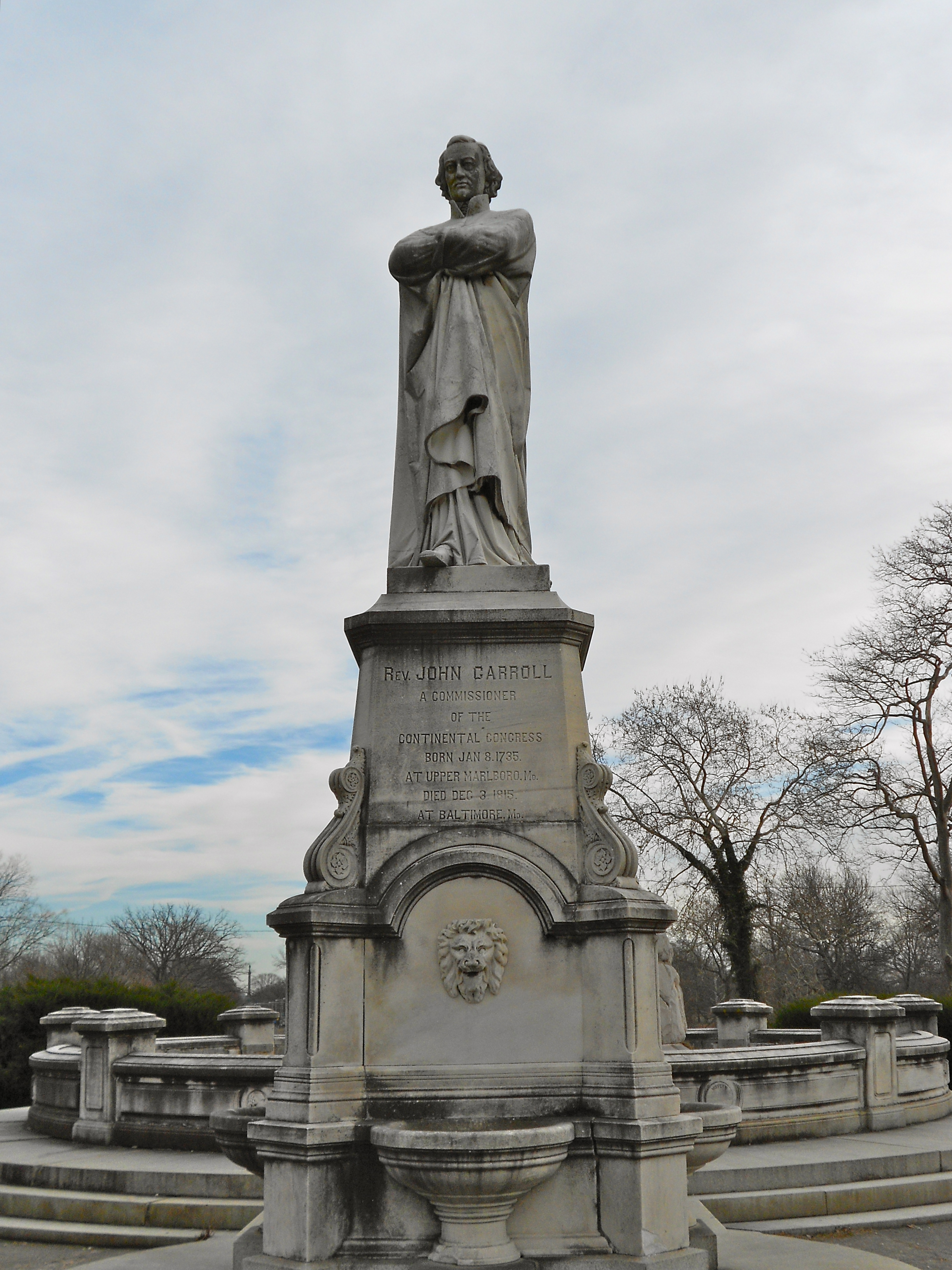
The Catholic Total Abstinence Centennial Fountain in Fairmount Park was dedicated on 4 July 1876, following a parade of more than 5,000 and a Mass at the Cathedral of Saints Peter and Paul.

Catholic involvement in the temperance movement has been very strong since at least the nineteenth century, with a number of specifically Catholic societies formed to encourage moderation or total abstinence from alcohol.

In Ireland, the priest Theobald Mathew persuaded thousands of people to sign the temperance pledge, therefore, establishing the Teetotal Abstinence Society in 1838, which would later be renamed the Knights of Father Mathew. The League of the Cross was a Catholic total abstinence confraternity founded in 1873 by Cardinal Henry Edward Manning.

The Plenary Councils of Baltimore declared:

Let the exeretions of Catholic temperance societies meet with hearty co-operation of pastor and people, and they will go farr towards strangling the emonstrous evil of intemperance. Pastoral Lettere, Acta, p. xciii. The misuse of intoxicating drinks is certainly one of the most deplorable evils of our age and country. Intemperance is a constant source of sin and a copious fountain of misery. It has brought to utter ruin countless multitudes and entire families, and has precipitated into eternal perdition very many souls. All should, therefore, be exhorted, by the love of God and country, to bend every energy to the extirpation of this baleful evil. To the clergy, to whom God has given the office of breaking unto men the Bread of Life and training them in Christian morality, we chiefly look for helpers in this great work. Let them never cease to raise their voices against drunkenness and the causes and occasions of it, especially in giving spiritual missions to the people.

Pope Leo XIII, on 27 March 1887, commended the work of the temperance movement, especially the Catholic Total Abstinence Union, "esteem[ing] worthy of all commendation the noble resolve of your pious associations, by which they pledge themselves to abstain totally from every kind of intoxicating drinks." James Joseph McGovern wrote that Leo XIII supported total abstinence during his long Pontificate", giving "unqualified encouragement to Cardinal Manning who labored most zealously for the suppression of the liquor traffic that was so demoralizing to the working classes in England."

In 1898, James Cullen founded the Pioneer Total Abstinence Association in response to the fading influence of the original temperance pledge and this organisation remains active to this day.

In 1911, The Michigan Catholic implored the faithful: “Vote for the saloon if you want future generations to be shriveled, bloodless, prematurely decayed creatures. … Vote against the saloon if you wish to build up a race of giant, healthy manhood and glorious womanhood.”

== See also ==
- Temperance movement
