= Catholic Total Abstinence Union of America =

19th-century Catholic temperance organization

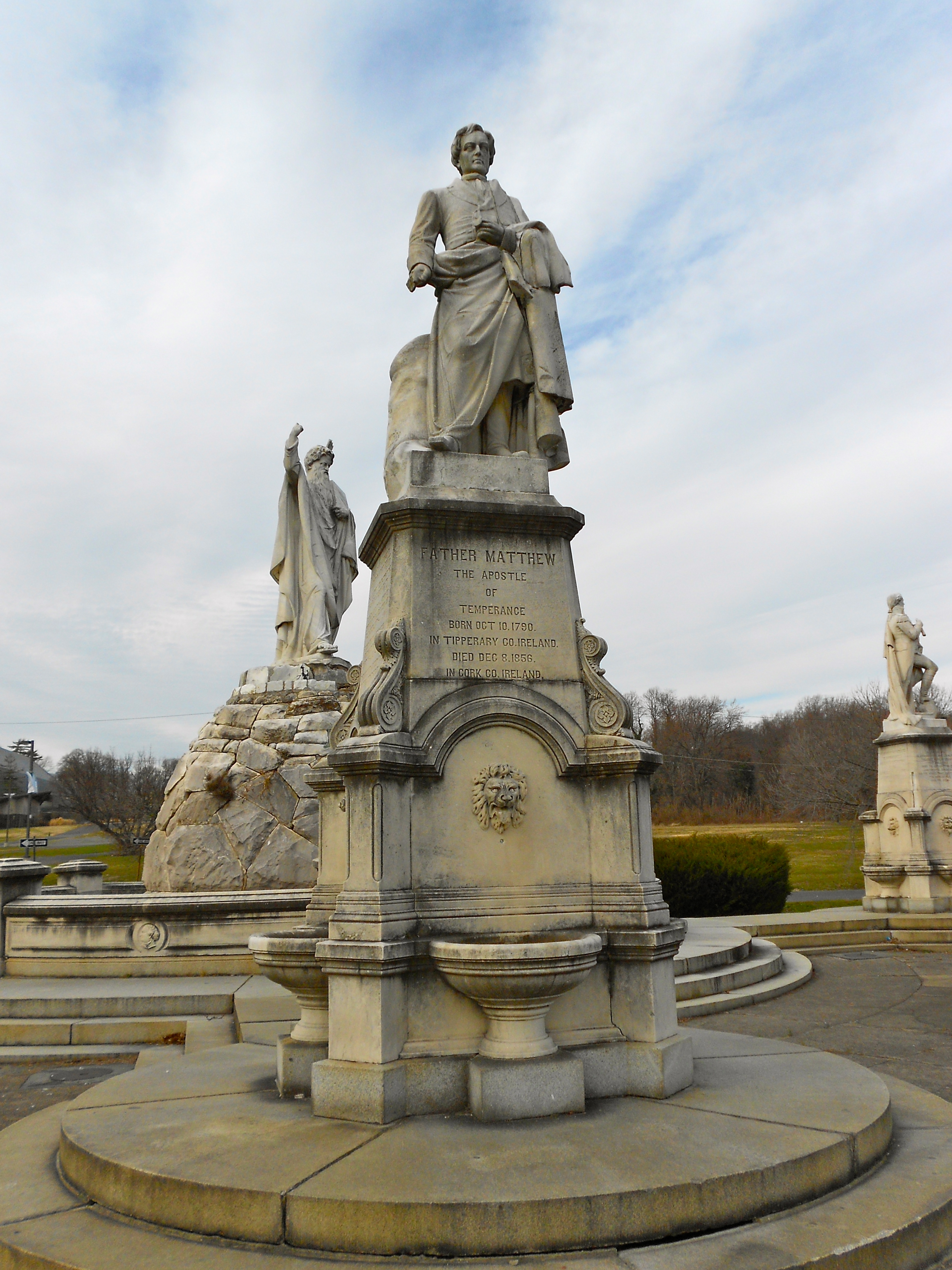
The Catholic Total Abstinence Centennial Fountain in Fairmount Park was dedicated on July 4, 1876, following a parade of more than 5,000 and a Mass at the Cathedral of Saints Peter and Paul.

The Catholic Total Abstinence Union of America was a Catholic temperance organization active in the 19th and 20th centuries. The work of Father Mathew in promoting temperance across the U.S. led to the establishment of numerous separate and independent Catholic temperance groups. The Catholic temperance societies of Connecticut created a state union in 1871, from which a national union was formed the following year at a convention in Baltimore, Maryland. 177 such societies from 10 states and the District of Columbia, representing a total of 26,481 members, created the Catholic Total Abstinence Union of America. In total, over 500,000 Catholics made the temperance of the Catholic Total Abstinence Union of America.

The Union included women's and juvenile societies as well as the Priest's Total Abstinence League. Its monthly publication was The C.T.A.U. Advocate. The Reverend Thomas J. Conaty, then the president of the Catholic Total Abstinence Union of America, advocated for teetotalism in the May 1887 edition of Catholic World:

The saloon has fastened itself upon society as an ulcer living upon the life-blood of the people. The saloon, building itself upon the ruin of broken lives and shattered homes, spreads desolation every where, respecting no class or sex. The union recalls the countless boys ruined, the fathers changed into destroyers of their little ones, the industry paralyzed, the prisons filled, and it asks each saloon how much of this is its work. It calls on the law to place about the saloon such reasonable restrictions as will remove as far as possible the evils that spring up from it. It demands the enforcement of those laws for the protection of home. The arrogance of the saloon and the power it wields in political affairs, all for its own interests and against those of society, have awakened a stronger interest in the cause of total abstinence organized on Catholic principles.

With regard to the issue of National Prohibition, the Catholic Total Abstinence Union passed a resolution in the 1870s resolving "That this convention, though not deeming it expedient to take part in any political of legislative action in reference to prohibitory liquor laws, recognizes, however, the great good that would accrue from the suppression of public drinking-places, and from such legislation as would restrain the manufacture of intoxicating liquors within the bounds consistent with public morality, and will gladly hail such legislation whenever the proper authorities may grant it."

The Plenary Councils of Baltimore declared:

We approve as highly commendable, in our times, the practice of those who abstain entirely from the use of intoxicating liquors. We also recognize as worthy of great praise the Catholic Total Abstinence Union and the confraternity of 'The Sacred Thirst,' laboring as they are, by prayer and good works, for the promotion of temperance, and relying as they do more on the grace of God, the efficacy of prayer and the sacraments, than on the strength of the human will alone. We commend these associations, enjoying as they do the blessing of the Holy Father [Pope], to the paternal care of the clergy, so that they may flourish more and more, and always adhere to the truly Catholic methods they now follow.

Pope Leo XIII, on 27 March 1887, commended the work of the temperance movement, especially the Catholic Total Abstinence Union, "esteem[ing] worthy of all commendation the noble resolve of your pious associations, by which they pledge themselves to abstain totally from every kind of intoxicating drinks."

President Theodore Roosevelt positively cited the work of the Union in an August 1905 address.

== See also ==
- Pioneer Total Abstinence Association
- Catholic Total Abstinence Union Fountain
- List of Temperance organizations
