= Catholic Total Abstinence Union Fountain =

Former drinking fountain in Philadelphia

Coordinates: 39°58′56.64″N 75°13′10.56″W

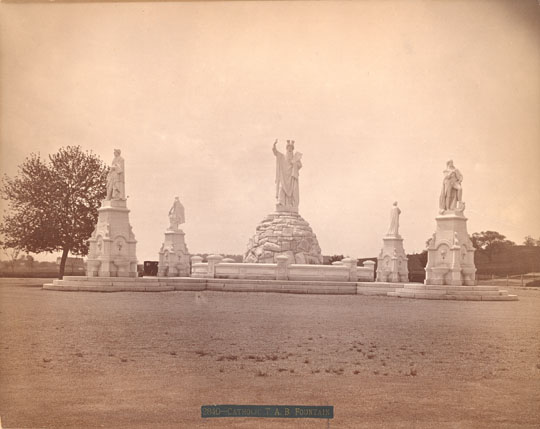
- Artist: Herman Kirn, designer and sculptor Thomas McElwee, portrait medallions Isaac H. Hobbs & Son, architects
- Year: 1874-1877
- Type: Fountain and water fountain
- Location: Avenue of the Republic & States Street, West Fairmount Park, Philadelphia, Pennsylvania

The Catholic Total Abstinence Union Fountain (1874–1877) – also known as The Catholic Total Abstinence Centennial Fountain or The Centennial Fountain – is a now-defunct ornamental fountain and drinking fountain located in West Fairmount Park, Philadelphia, Pennsylvania. Created as an attraction for the 1876 Centennial Exposition, it was commissioned by the Catholic Total Abstinence Union of America, a religious organization that advocated for total abstinence from alcohol.

== Creation ==
The fountain was intended to symbolize "the power of religion, the virtues of temperance, and the Irish Catholic love of patriotism and liberty."

It was designed by German-born-and-trained Philadelphia sculptor Herman Kirn (1847/48 - 1920). Kirn came to the U.S. at age six, then returned to Karlsruhe as a young adult to study under Carl Johann Steinhäuser for six years. Steinhäuser provided letters of recommendation for this commission. Kirn's other work in the park includes the 1883 Willian Penn statue atop Mom Rinker's Rock, titled Toleration, and his Orestes and Pylades drinking fountain of 1884, cast in bronze from a Steinhäuser original design. During the erection of this last piece, Kirn lost the use of his right arm to a falling piece of stone. Thereafter the Park employed him.

Kirn exhibited a 12-foot diameter plaster of Paris model of the Catholic fountain as early as February 1874 at the city's Academy of Music. Fundraising for the project was slow, and it was the following autumn that Kirn formally received the commission. Tyrolean marble was chosen for the statues, and Kirn moved to southern Austria to carve them at a quarry in Laas.

== Description ==
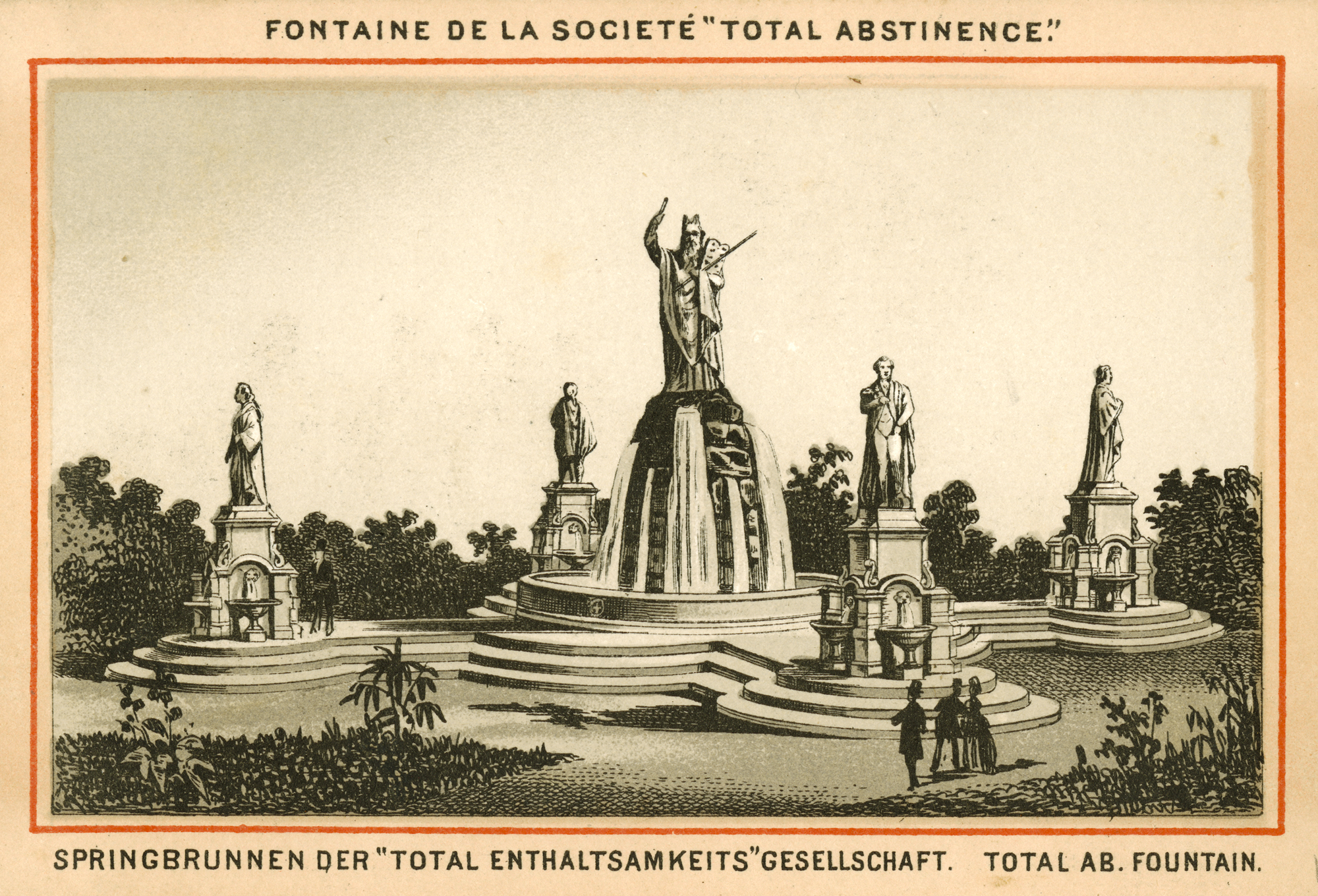
Illustration from a Centennial Exposition guidebook (1876).

The fountain's 100-foot-wide stepped base is of granite and in the shape of a Maltese cross. At the center is a 40-foot diameter basin featuring a 15-foot statue of Moses, who clutches the Ten Commandments with his left arm, holds his staff (now missing) in his left hand, and points skyward with his shofar or horn (now missing) in his right hand. He stands upon a beehive-shaped mound of marble that signifies the Rock of Horeb, which God instructed Moses to strike with his staff to provide water for the Israelites. The fountain was fed by a reservoir atop nearby George's Hill, and small waterfalls flowed from the rock mound. The basin's marble outer wall features six portrait medallions of prominent Catholics who fought in the Revolutionary War – including George Meade, Count Casimir Pulaski and the Marquis de Lafayette – and the seal of the Total Abstinence Union. Outside the basin, on the arms of the cross, are four larger-than-life subsidiary statues of prominent American Catholics – Archbishop John Carroll, Charles Carroll of Carrollton, Father Theobald Mathew, and Commodore John Barry. Each statue's granite pedestal featured four lion-head spouts from which water flowed, for a total of sixteen drinking fountains.

== Dedication ==
The fountain was dedicated on July 4, 1876, following a mass at the Cathedral of Saints Peter and Paul; and a parade of more than 5,000 north on Broad Street, west on Girard Avenue, and over the Girard Avenue Bridge to the Centennial fairgrounds. Composer Edward Mack wrote the "Centennial Fountain Grand March" for the occasion. Speeches were made by prominent Catholic clergy and individuals, culminating in a final blessing by Father James O'Reilly:

Oh God, by whose word all things are made holy, give Thy blessing to this Fountain, and grant that whosoever will make use with thanksgiving, according to Thy will and Thy law, may, through the invocation of Thy most holy name, receive from Thee health of body and spiritual protection, through Christ our Lord, Amen.

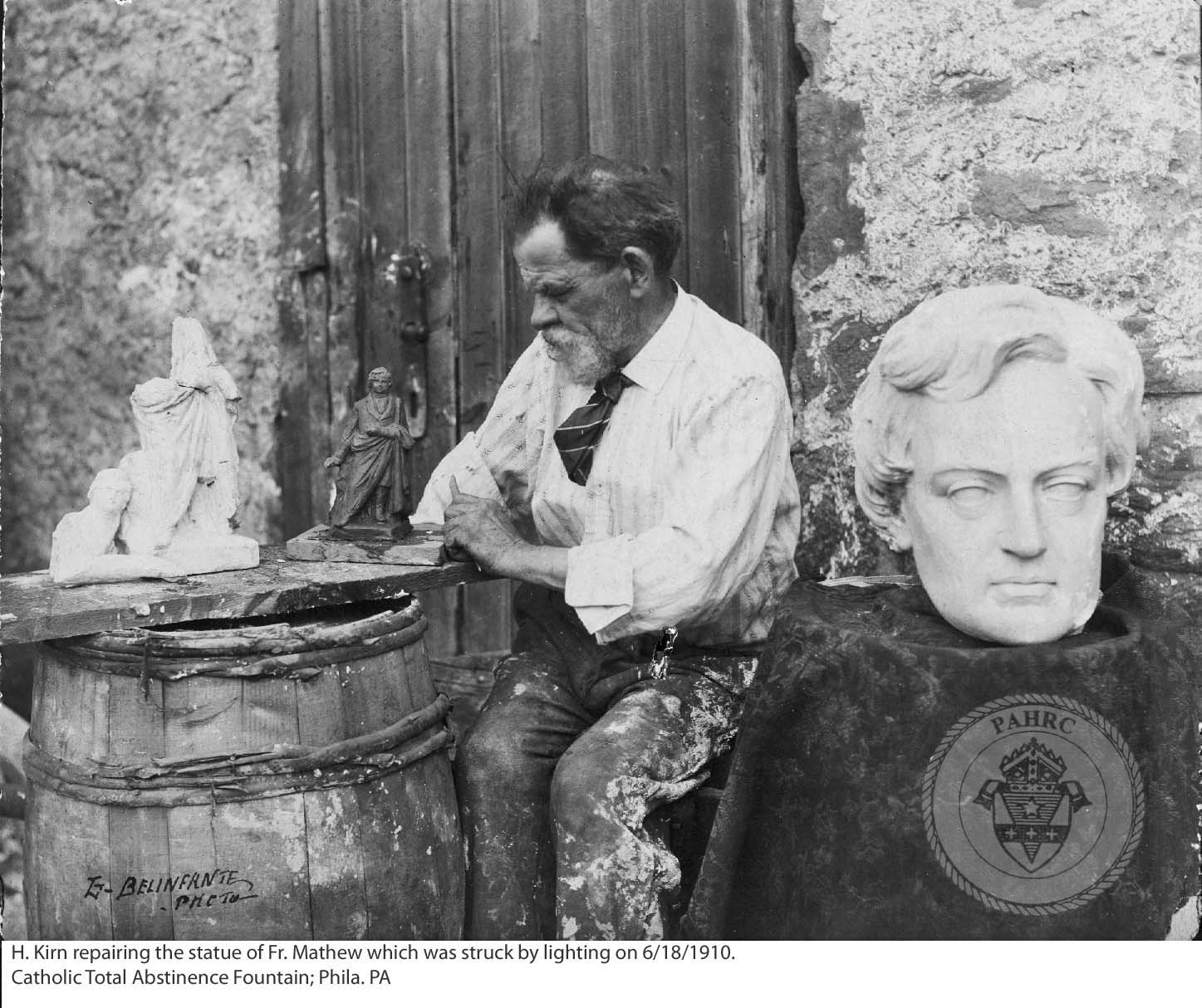
Herman Kirn repairing Father Mathew's statue

The fountain itself was operational for the dedication, including the sixteen pedestal drinking fountains, but only the statue of Commodore Barry was in place. The other four were still in Austria, and in various states of completion. It remained in this condition through the November 1876 closing of the exposition, and beyond. The Father Mathew, Archbishop Carroll, and Charles Carroll of Carrollton statues were dedicated on March 17, 1877 (Saint Patrick's Day); and the central Moses Striking the Rock of Horeb statue was dedicated on July 4, 1877.

== Later history ==
The statue of Father Mathew was damaged by lightning on June 18, 1910. Sculptor Kirn, who had modeled it 35 years earlier, repaired it.

== Gallery ==
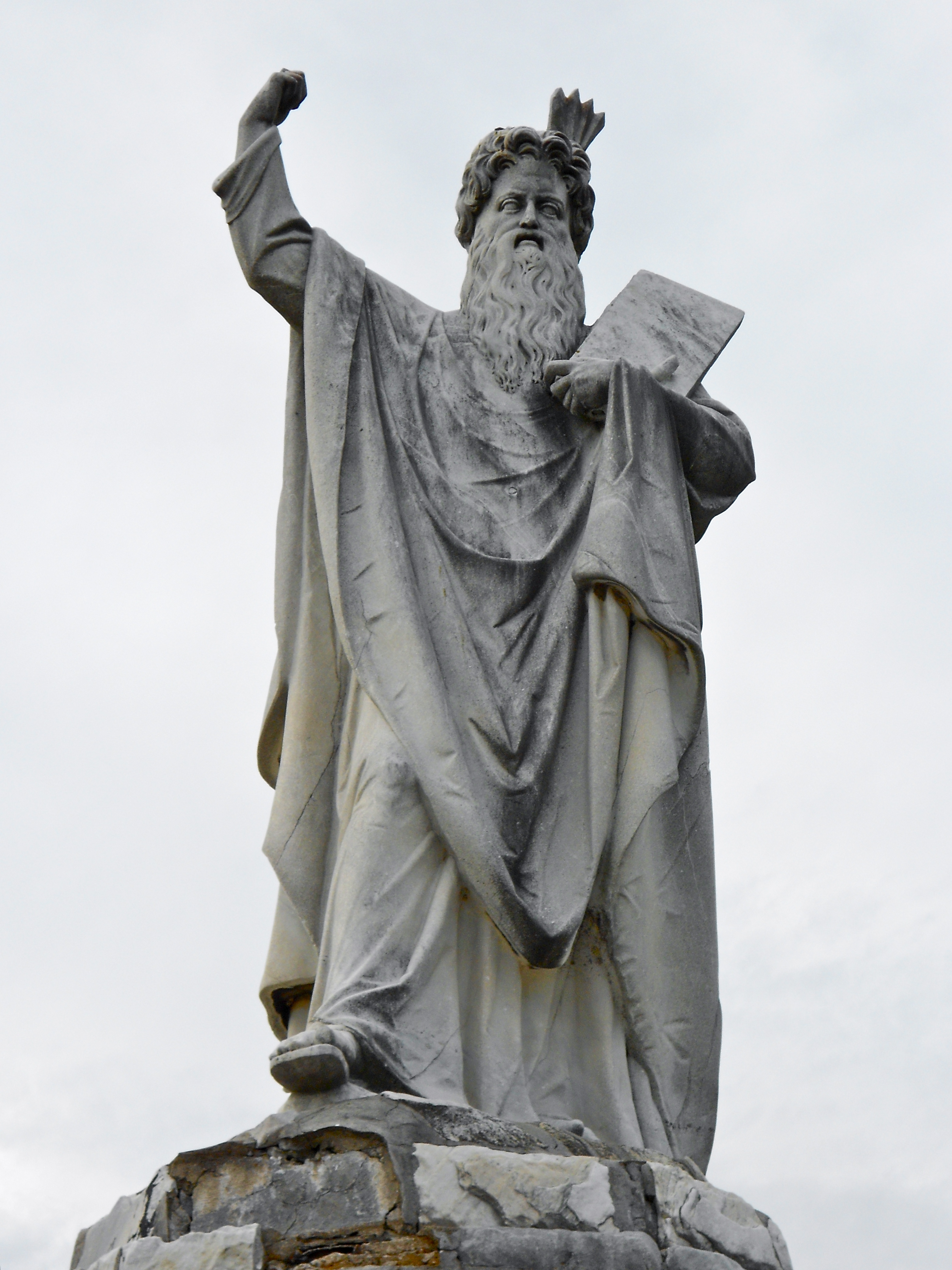
Moses Striking the Rock of Horeb.

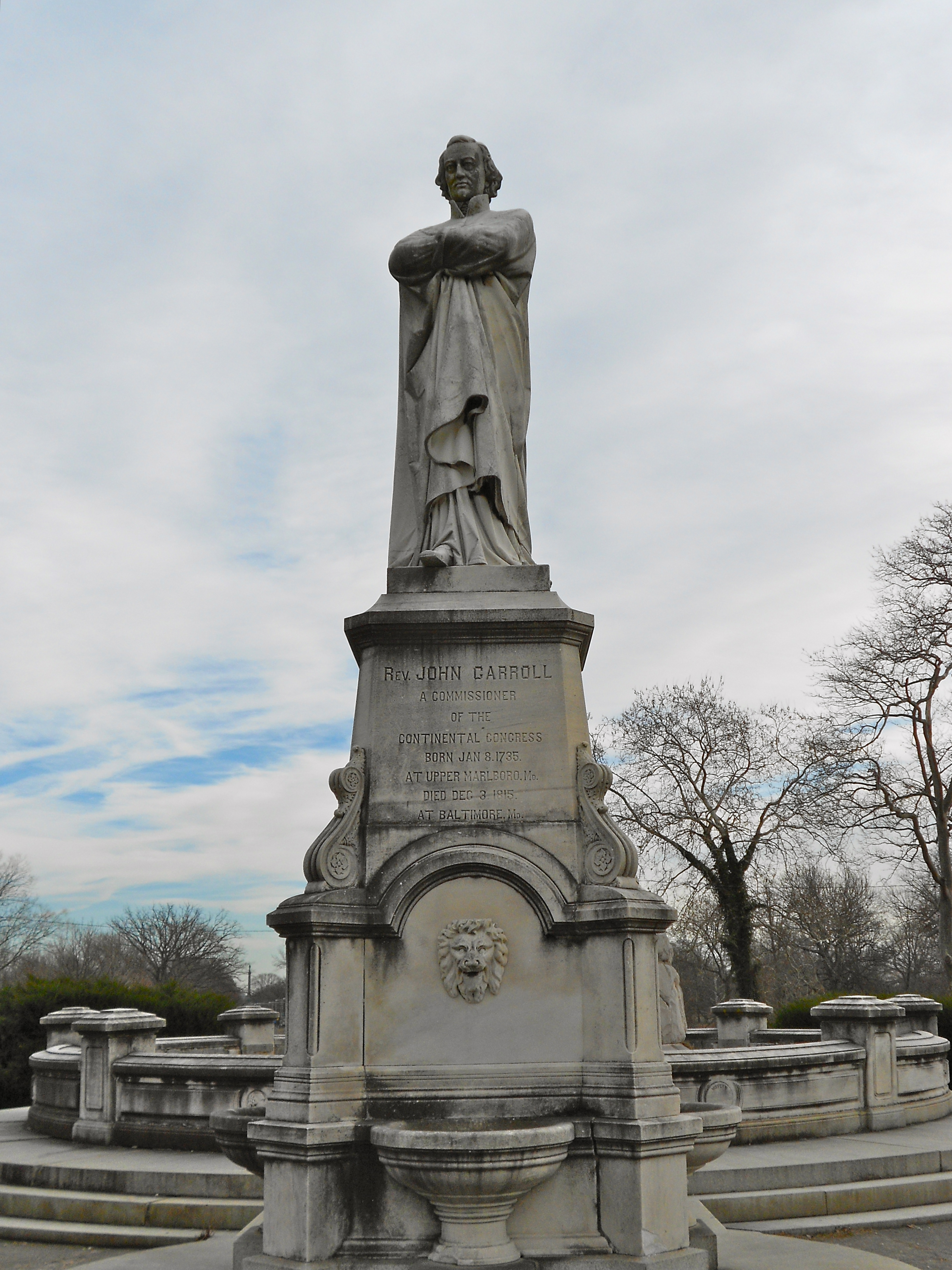
Archbishop Carroll.

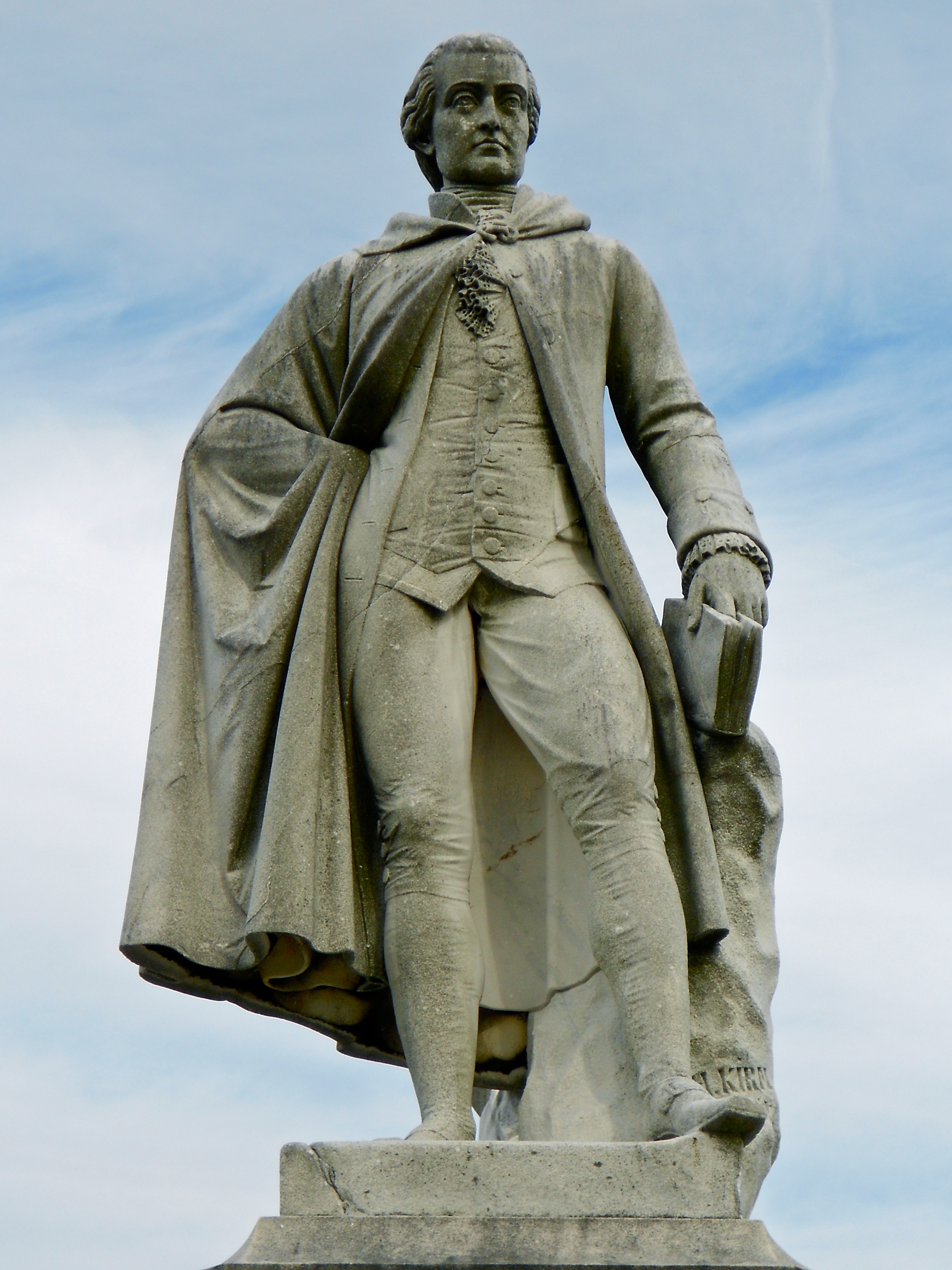
Charles Carroll of Carrollton.

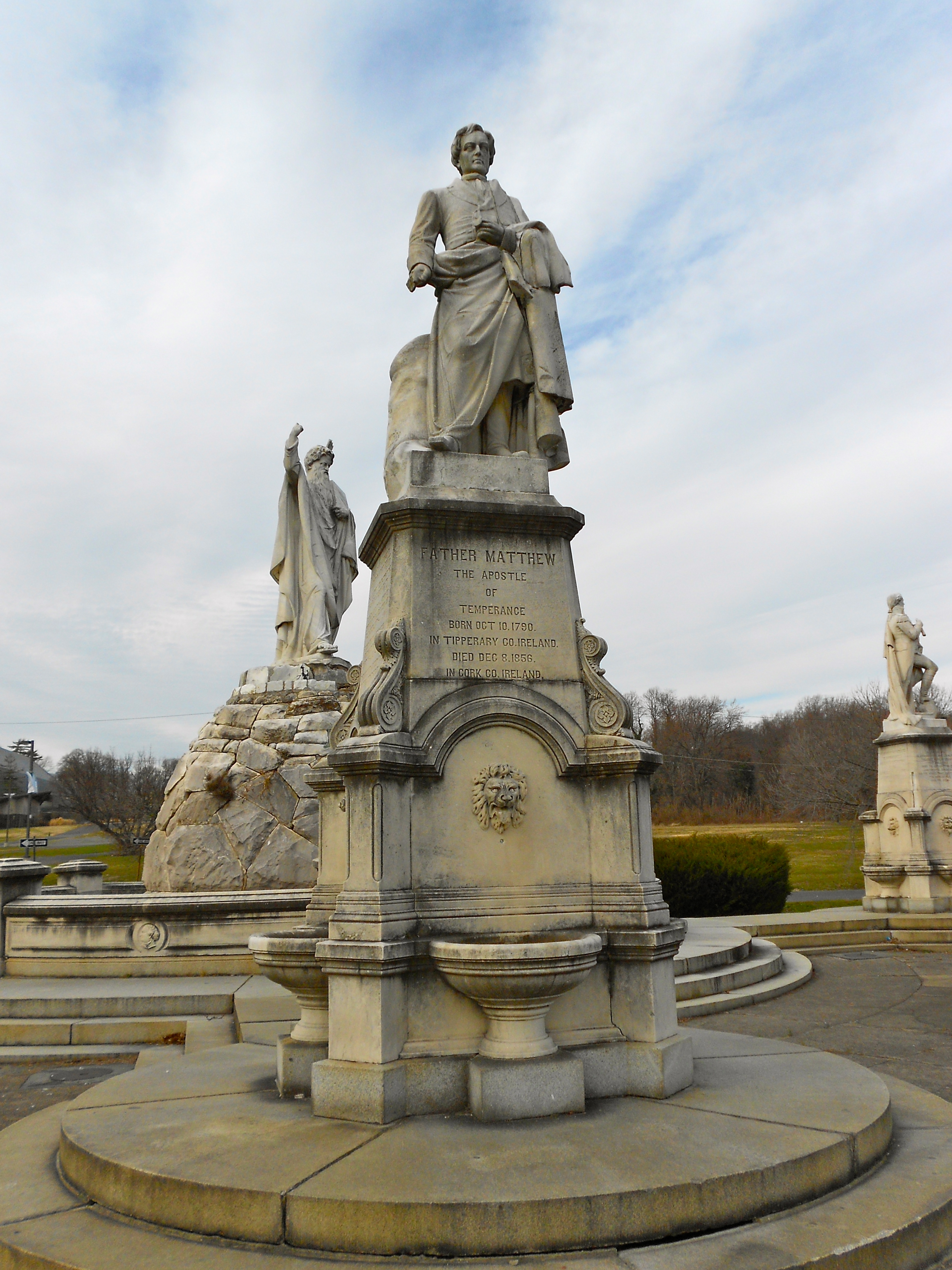
Father Mathew

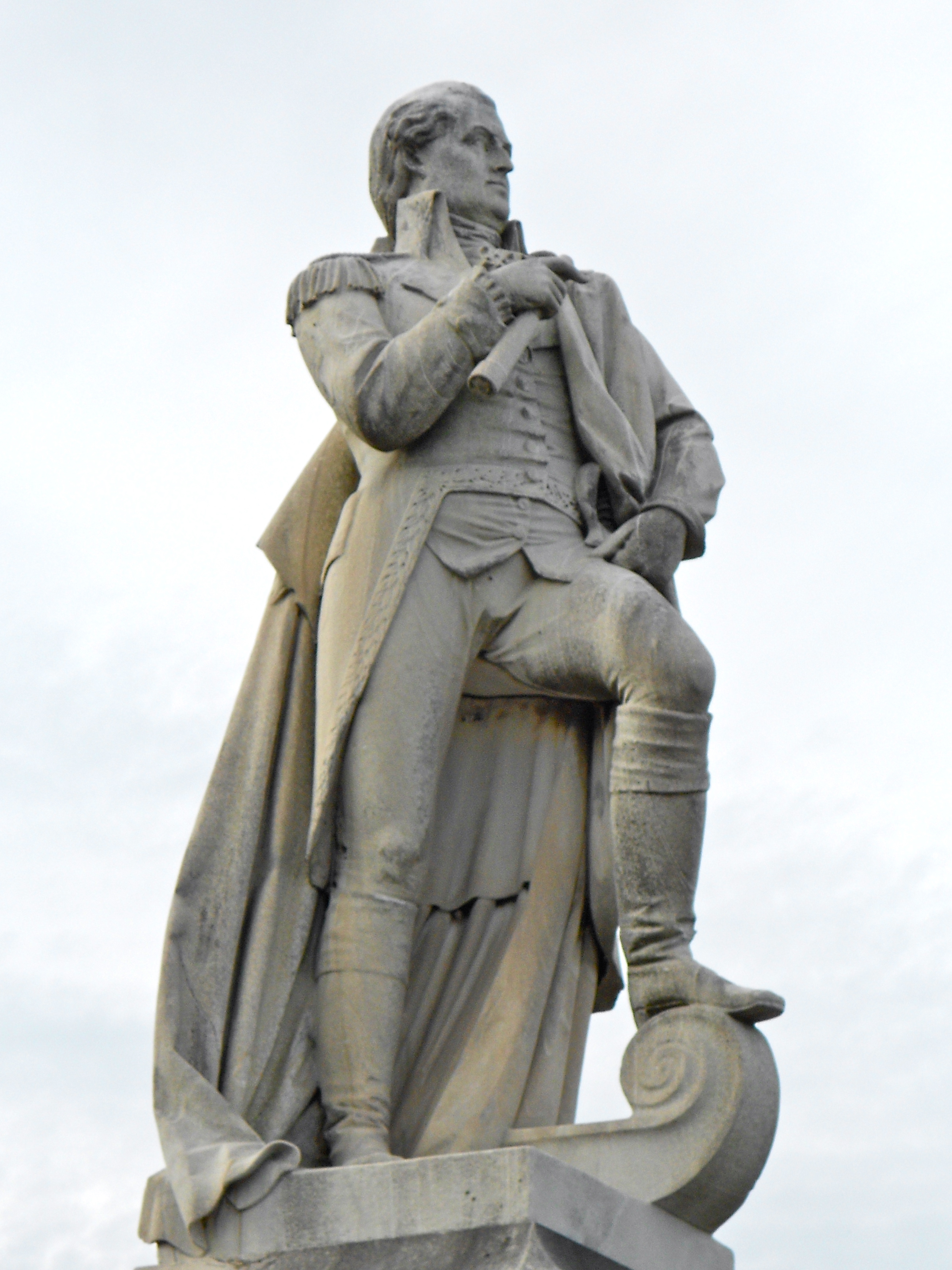
Commodore Barry.
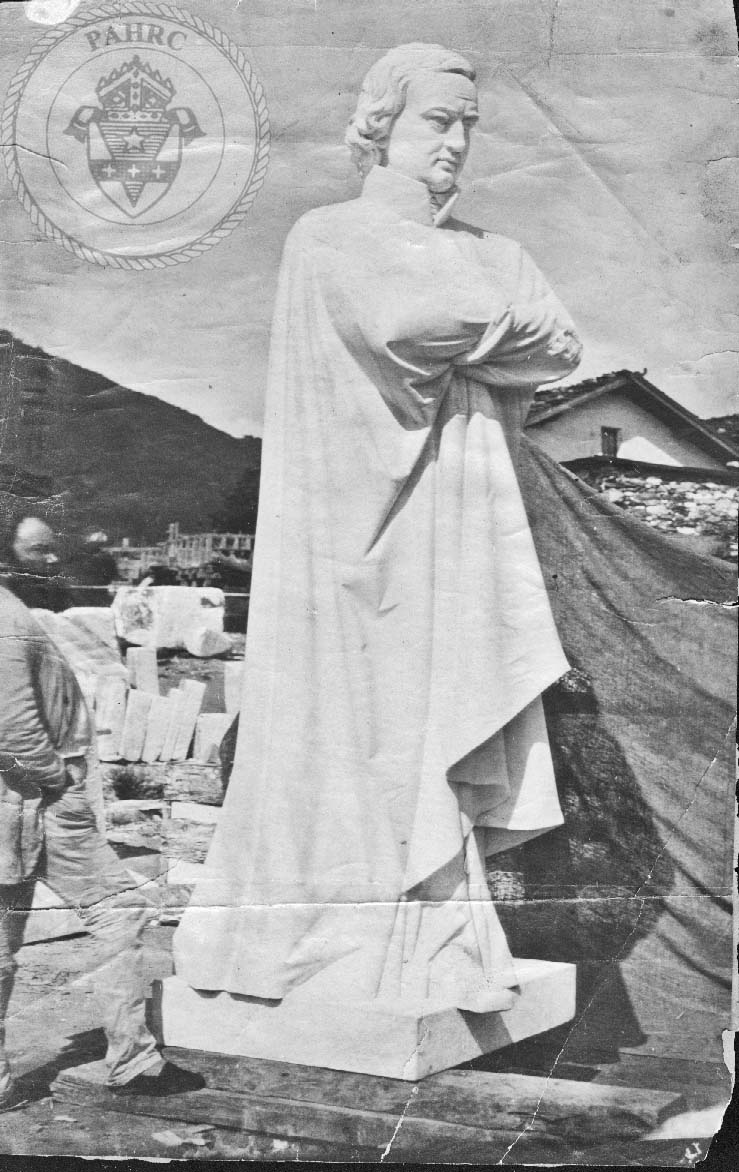
Herman Kirn w. J. Carroll ca. 1875

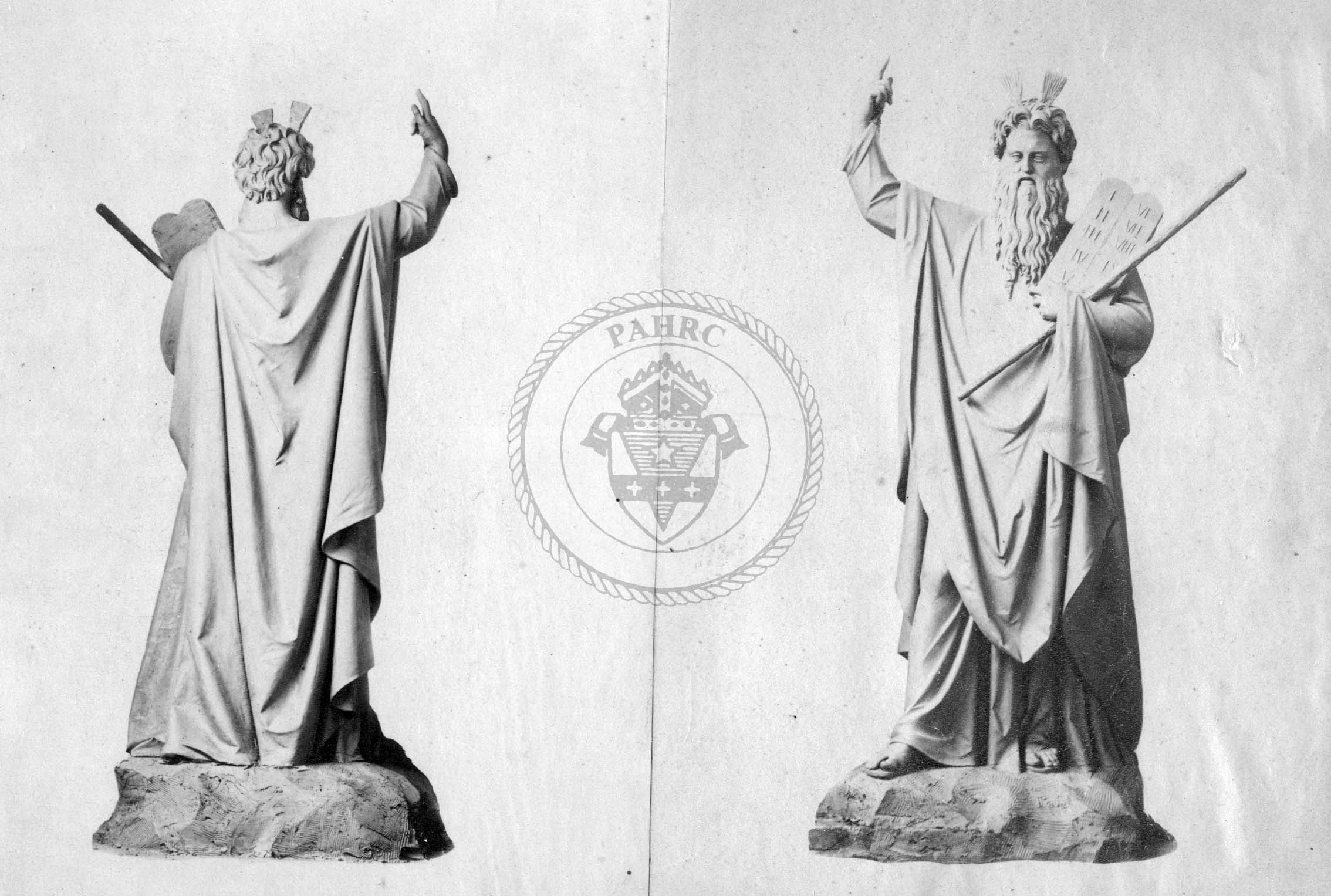
Herman Kirn clay model for Moses, Catholic Total Abstinence Union Fountain.

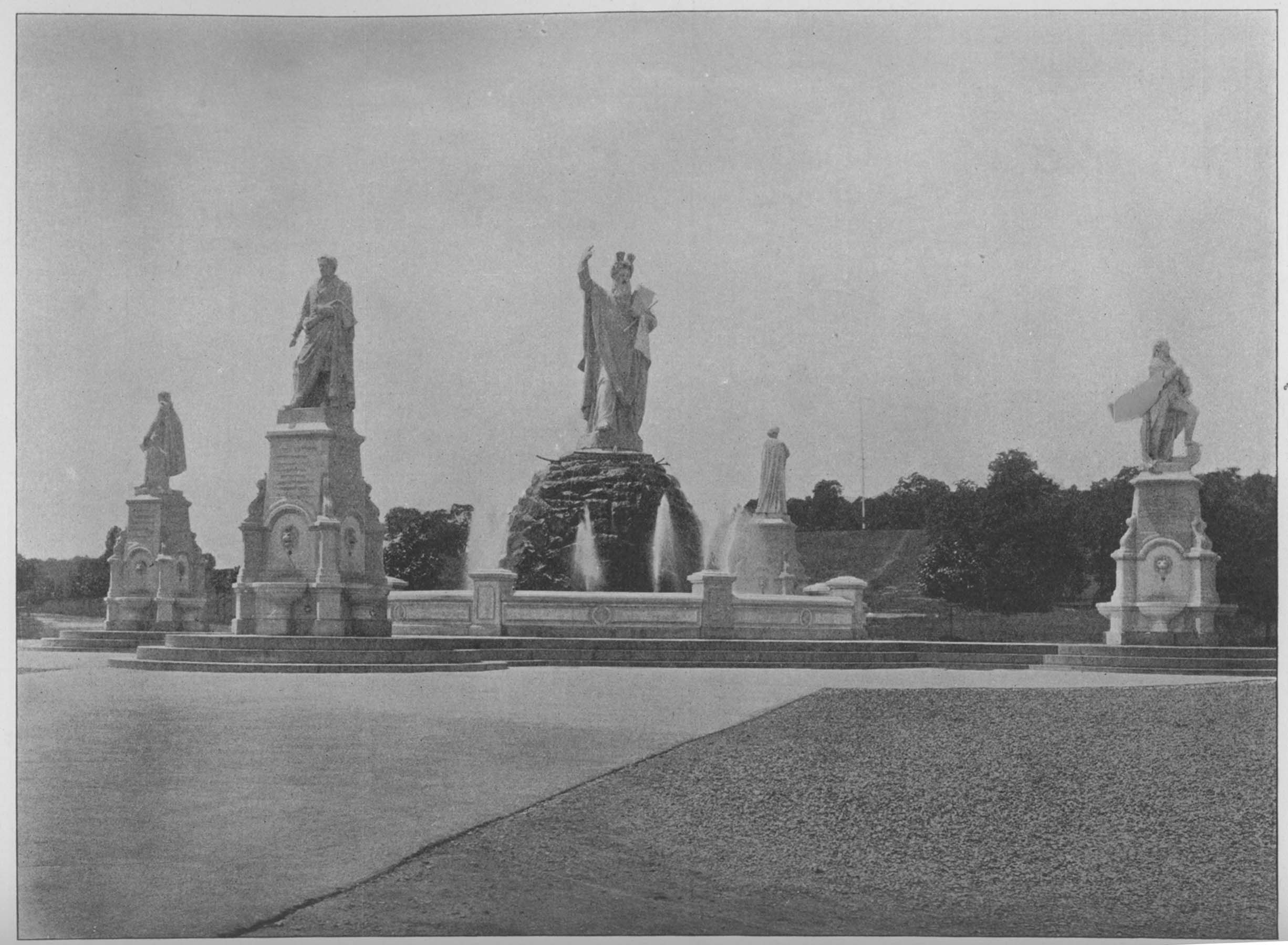
Photo of Fountain w. water running.

== See also ==
- List of public art in Philadelphia
- Drinking fountains in Philadelphia
