= Drinking fountains in Philadelphia =

Public drinking fountains in the U.S. city of Philadelphia

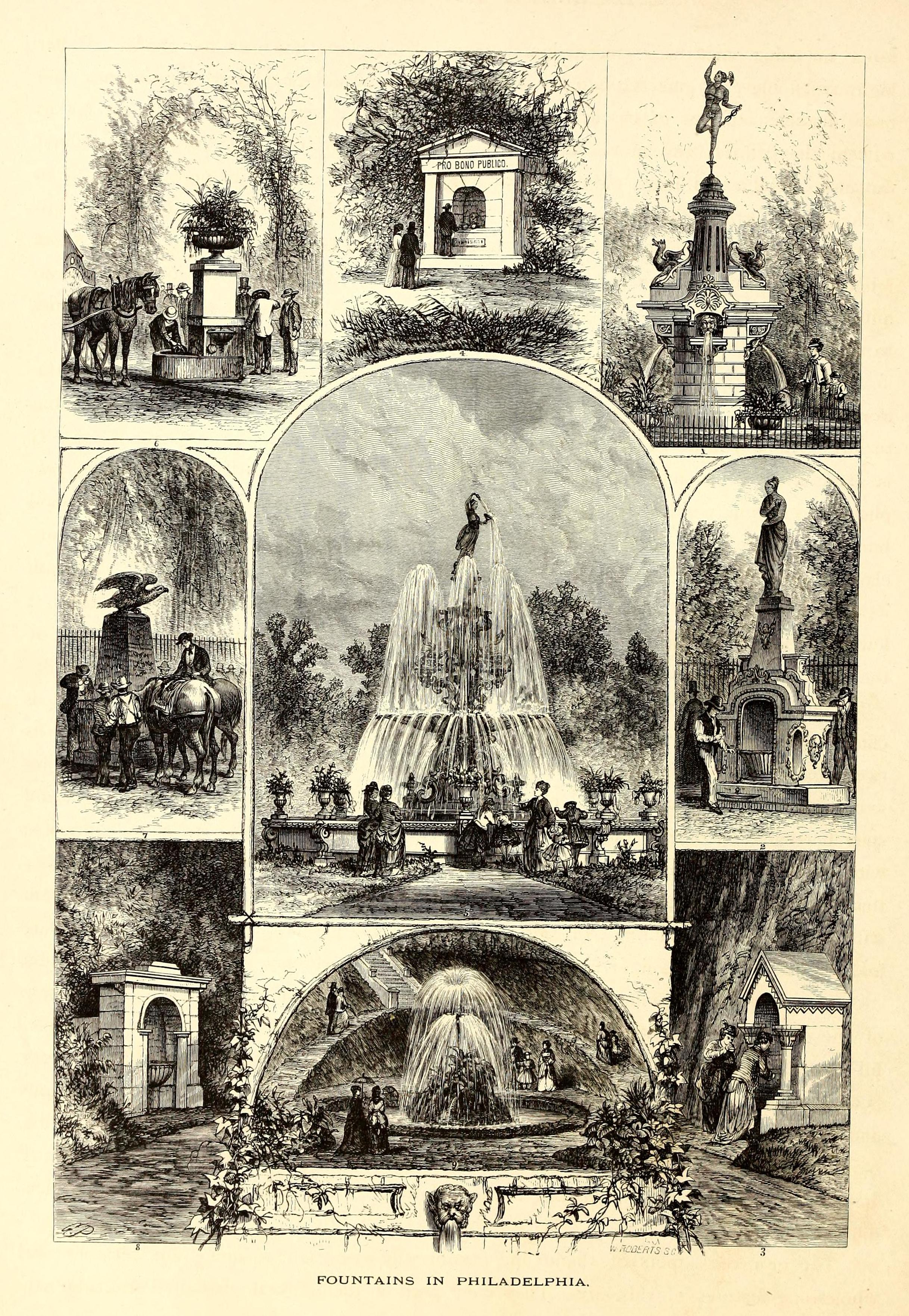
Fountains in Philadelphia (1874) by Granville Perkins. Counter-clockwise from top: First Fountain; Tyler Memorial Fountain; Washington Square Fountain; Lemon Hill Spring; Goldfish Pond Fountain; Peace Fountain; Rittenhouse Square Fountain; Mercury Fountain. Center: Mott's Cast Iron Fountain (Horticultural Center)

Public drinking fountains in Philadelphia, Pennsylvania, United States, have been built and used since the 19th century. Various reform-minded organizations in the city supported public drinking fountains as street furniture for different but overlapping reasons. One was the general promotion of public health, in an era of poor water and typhoid fever. Leaders of the temperance movement such as the Woman's Christian Temperance Union saw free, clean water as a crucial alternative to beer. Emerging animal welfare organizations, notably the Society for the Prevention of Cruelty to Animals, wanted to provide water to the dogs and working horses of the city on humanitarian grounds, which is why Philadelphia's drinking fountains of the era often include curb-level troughs that animals could reach.

== History ==
=== Background ===
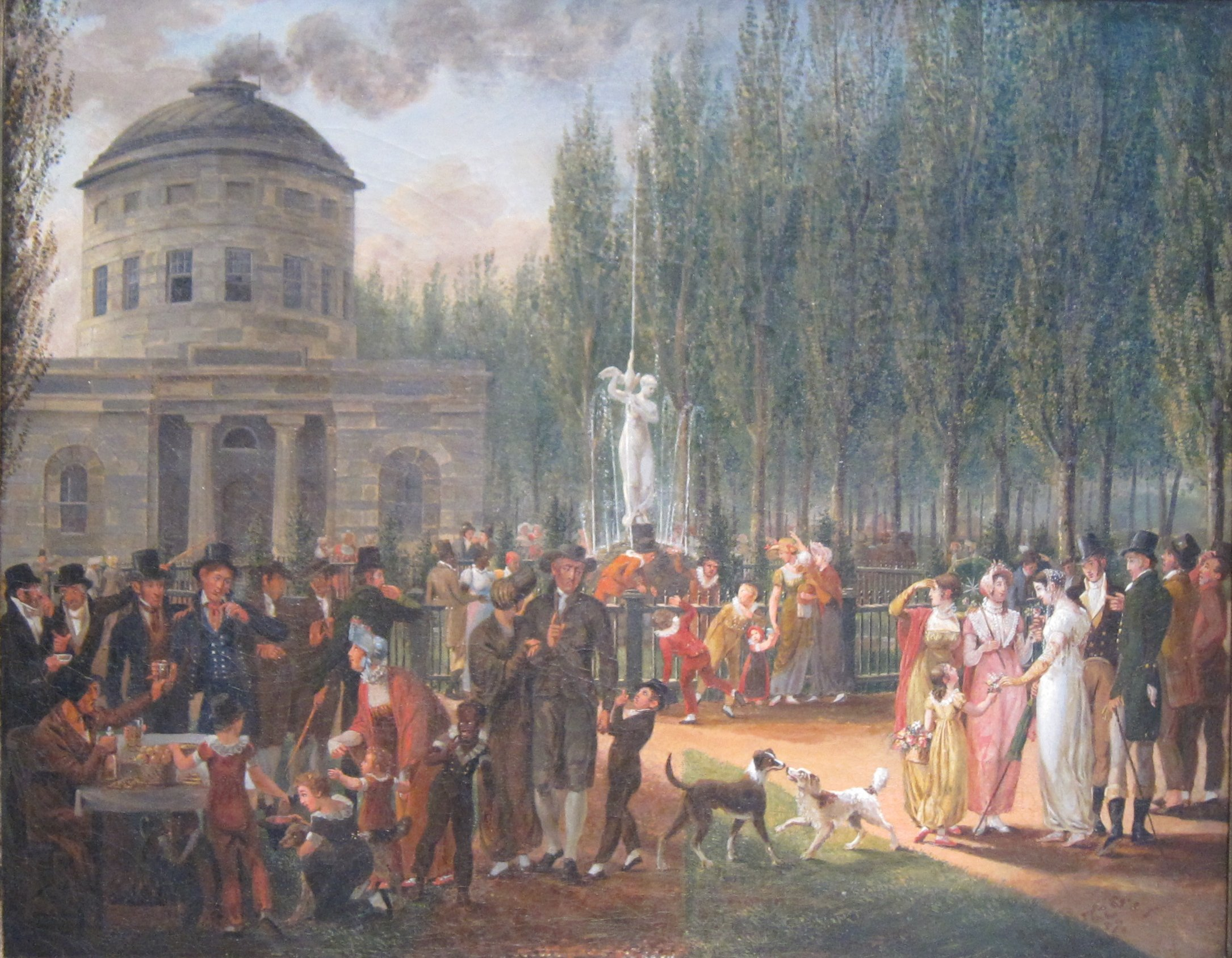
Fourth of July Celebration in Centre Square (c.1812) by John Lewis Krimmel. William Rush's Water Nymph and Bittern (1809) is at center.

Philadelphia suffered multiple yellow fever epidemics in the 1790s. The Philadelphia Watering Committee, formally the Joint Committee on Bringing Water to the City, was founded in 1797–98 with the mission of constructing a public water system to combat the disease. Scottish-born architect Benjamin Henry Latrobe, famous for being the architect of the United States Capitol building, designed the Philadelphia system in which an underground brick aqueduct carried drinking water from the Schuylkill River to Centre Square, now the site of Philadelphia City Hall. There, twin steam pumps propelled the water into a tank in the tower of the pumping house, from which gravity distributed it throughout the city via wooden water mains (cored logs). Completed in January 1801, this was the first citywide gravity-fed public water system in the United States.

Latrobe's chief draftsman, Frederick Graff, designed a T-shaped wooden fire hydrant in 1802, that featured "a drinking fountain on one side and a 4-1/2-inch water main on the other." The hydrants were installed along every major street of the city.

Latrobe's Greek Revival pumping house and the gardens surrounding it became a major attraction. Graff was promoted to manager of the Water Works in 1805, and designed the fountain for Centre Square. The Watering Committee commissioned sculptor William Rush to create a statue, Allegory of the Schuylkill River, to be its centerpiece. Better known as Water Nymph with Bittern, it was carved from pine and painted white (in imitation of marble). The first public fountain in Philadelphia was unveiled in August 1809.

=== Drinking fountains ===
The idea of purpose-built drinking fountains was relatively novel. The first public drinking fountains in England appeared in Liverpool in 1854, through the efforts of Charles Pierre Melly, and that city had 43 in total by 1858. The first in London was a granite basin attached to the gates of St Sepulchre-without-Newgate, funded by Samuel Gurney and his Metropolitan Drinking Fountain and Cattle Trough Association in 1859.

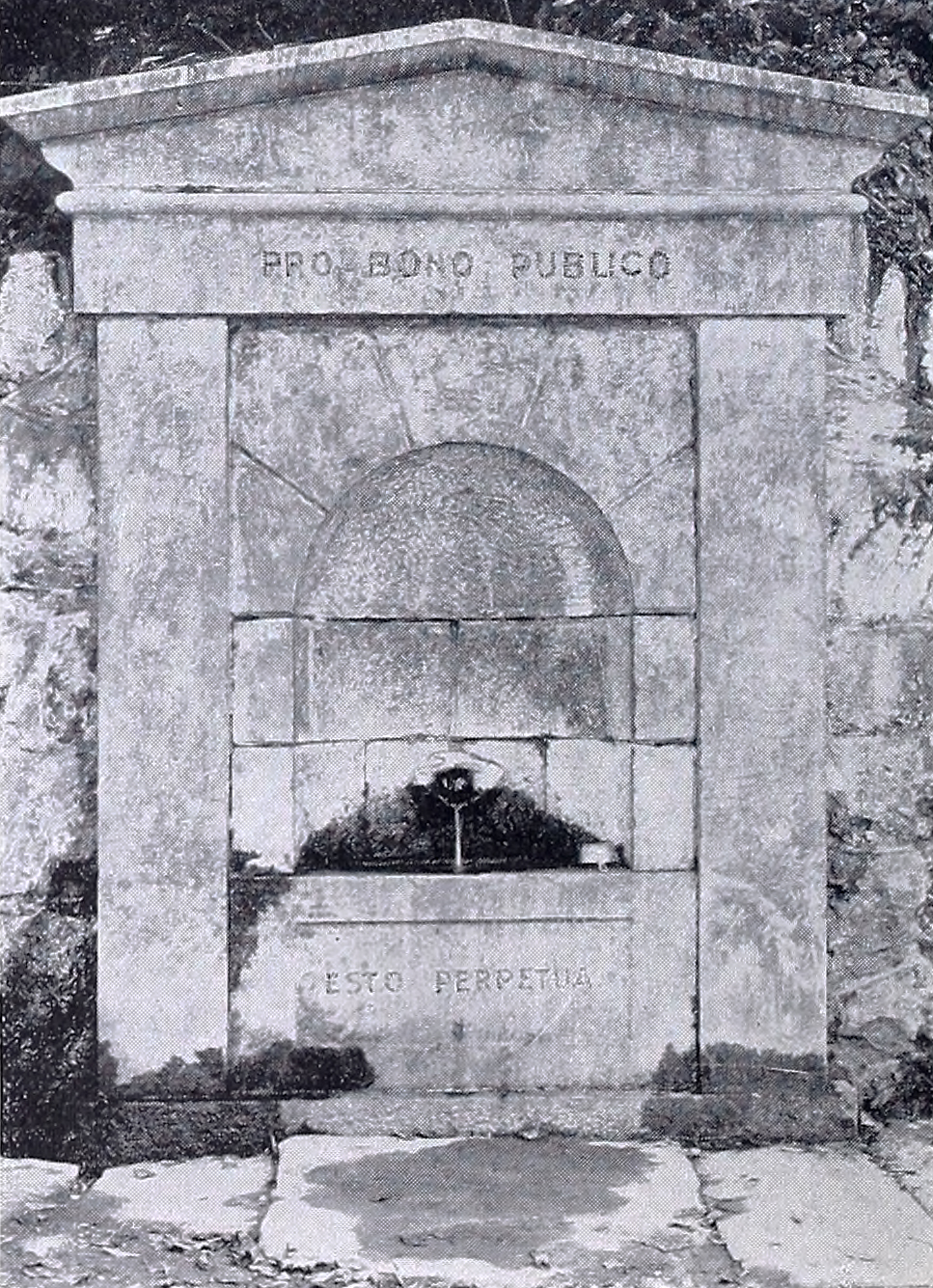
"First Fountain" (1854)

A spring-fed public drinking fountain was erected in 1854, along the Wissahickon Creek opposite Chestnut Hill. It was described in 1884 as:

The first fountain, so called, stands upon the side of the road on the west side of the Wissahickon ... It is claimed that this is the first drinking fountain erected in the county of Philadelphia outside of the Fairmount Water-Works. A clear, cold, mountain spring is carried by a spout, covered with a lion's head, from a niche in a granite front, with pilasters and pediment into a marble basin. The construction bears the date 1854 ... Upon a slab above the niche are cut the words "Pro bono publico"; beneath the basin these, "Esto perpetua".

In the 1860s, philanthropic groups and governments across the United States began to fund the building of water fountains, including the American Society for the Prevention of Cruelty to Animals in 1867 (in Union Square in New York City), and the Philadelphia Fountain Society beginning in April 1869. New fountains in Philadelphia proved immediately successful. They quickly proved their "utility and absolute necessity;" by September 1869 the Fountain Society had constructed 12, and the Pennsylvania branch of the ASPCA (PSPCA) had built another 5. As of 1880, the Philadelphia Fountain Society recorded 50 fountains serving approximately 3 million people and 1 million horses and other animals. Reformers continued installing such fountains throughout Philadelphia into the 1940s. Many remain.

In 2015, Philly Voice reported on plans to re-establish a system of public drinking fountains in the city.

== Sponsors ==
=== Philadelphia Fountain Society ===
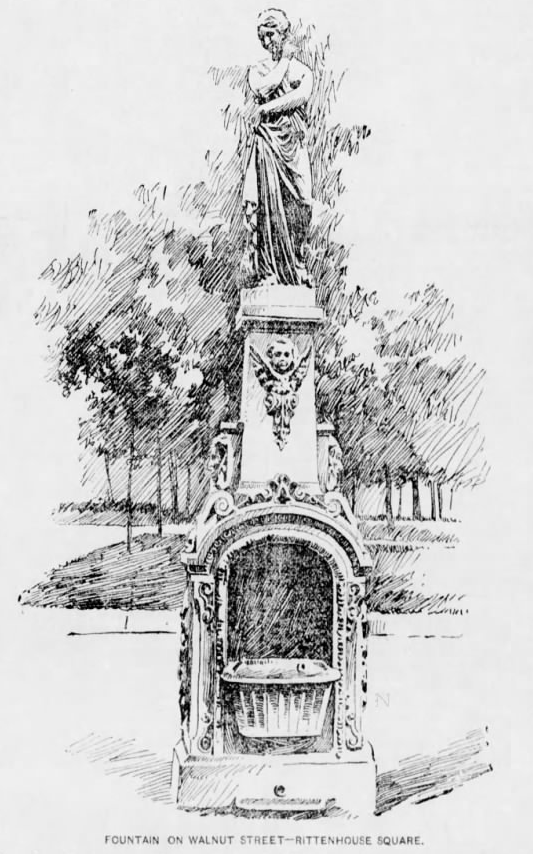
Rittenhouse Square Fountain (1872), 19th & Walnut Streets

The earliest and most prolific fountain-building organization was the Philadelphia Fountain Society, headed by medical doctor and art collector Wilson Cary Swann (1806–1876) and formally incorporated on April 21, 1869, with the stated mission of developing water fountains and water troughs for Philadelphia. "[O]ur object", wrote Swann, "is the erection and maintenance in this city of public drinking fountains for the health and refreshment of the people of Philadelphia and the benefit of dumb animals".

The society hoped that water fountains would directly improve quality-of-life for workers and working animals in the city, and indirectly promote temperance; Swann felt that "the lack of water for workers and animals led to intemperance and crime", and that drinking fountains positioned around the city would help "workers quench their thirst in public instead of entering local taverns". Some of Swann's arguments may have been derived from the like-minded London Metropolitan Drinking Fountain and Cattle Trough Association, established in 1859.

The fountains themselves were intended to be more functional than decorative, although many of them incorporate work by significant architects and sculptors. The society reached out to Philadelphians, advertising $5 for an annual membership, or $150 for a lifetime membership.

The society's first fountain went up in April 1869, adjacent to Washington Square, at 7th and Walnut Streets. A cast iron eagle perched on top, and below the plaque were two troughs, one for horses, one for dogs. (It was relocated to the south side of the square in 1916.) That same year, work began on two fountains for the 500 block of Chestnut Street, in front of Independence Hall. Prominent citizens such as John Wanamaker and Anthony Joseph Drexel provided funding to the society, and by July there were five operational fountains. Two years later, forty three fountains were managed by the society. The society installed three fountains on Rittenhouse Square, the first outside the iron fence at the square's northwest corner; the others within the iron fence at its northeast and southeast corners. Persistent flooding around the fountains created a nuisance, and the society removed them by 1884. (Note: The first improvement was an iron fountain, tall, grotesque, and fanciful, which, by the permission of Councils, was put up by a lady near the entrance-gate at Walnut and Rittenhouse [19th] Streets. It was followed by the construction of a similar fountain near the gate at Eighteenth and Walnut Streets, the gift of a gentleman, and another of similar style was put up near the gate at Eighteenth and Locust Streets. As they dampened the ground, the fountains became unpopular, and were removed by orders of the Councils. — Scharf & Westcott, 1884, p. 1850)

Swann handled a large portion of the society's work, and by 1874 it had erected 73 fountains. On April 17, 1874, Adelaide Neilson performed a concert to benefit the society at the Academy of Music.

The society had challenges. While rapidly constructing new fountains, it struggled to fund ongoing maintenance. In the 1870s, the city budgeted some money for upkeep, but that practice was ended by 1880. The city was hard on its drinking fountains. That first fountain at 7th and Walnut, which was "at all times surrounded by a thirsty crowd" as of 1896, had its iron eagle "blown over" to land on a boy and break his arm, resulting in civil damages, then its fortified replacement eagle was squarely broken off by a tree branch.

The destruction of fountains by boys and men with vandalistic tendencies, has to be constantly watched for and guarded against. Truck drivers and dragmen with heavy wagons also, by their carelessness, damage the fountains, and it is no uncommon thing for a fountain to be entirely knocked over by the pole of a brewery wagon ... the majority of the fountains ... erected now-a-days, are built low down, below the range of a wagon pole.

Swann died in 1876. By 1892, the number of fountains managed by the society had declined to 60. That year, Swann's wife died and left $80,000 to the society, as well as $25,000 for the construction of a fountain in his memory. By 1910, the number of horses in Philadelphia was decreasing as automobiles and streetcars gained in popularity, decreasing the need for fountains. After the completion of its last grand project, the Swann Memorial Fountain in Logan Circle in 1924, the society ceased building fountains. At its peak, the society had managed 82 fountains. It still exists as a grant-providing organisation.

=== Society for the Prevention of Cruelty to Animals ===
The Fountain Society was linked to the Pennsylvania branch of the newly formed American Society for the Prevention of Cruelty to Animals, co-founded in June 1868 by Colonel Mark Richards Muckle of the Public Ledger. The two had shared motivations, and Swann was involved in both. As of September 1869, press reports claimed "a very commendable rivalry in the erection of drinking fountains for man and beast will spring up between those two admirable associations", the Fountain Society with twelve in operation so far, and the Pennsylvania Society for the Prevention of Cruelty to Animals (PSPCA) credited with five, all fountains which had "proven their utility and absolute necessity" with more to come. Some of these featured a curb-level trough for small animals, and a separate drinking fountain for people.

By 1869, the activist Caroline Earle White had grown frustrated with her exclusion from any decision-making role in the PSPCA, which she had helped to found. She created a Women's Branch, essentially an auxiliary, which also independently commissioned the construction of public drinking fountains and horse troughs. White founded the American Anti-Vivisection Society in Philadelphia in 1883. She created its monthly magazine, Journal of Zoöphily, in 1892, and worked as editor for 25 years.

==== Women's Pennsylvania Society for the Prevention of Cruelty to Animals ====
White fully broke away from the PSPCA in 1899, founding the independent Women's Pennsylvania Society for the Prevention of Cruelty to Animals, or WPSPCA. The WPSPCA became co-publisher of Journal of Zoöphily, which promoted its good works. White was assisted by the efforts and financial support of the WPSPCA's vice-president, Annie L. Lowry, the childless widow of a successful Philadelphia lawyer. Lowry sponsored horse fountains at Walnut & Dock Streets and 8th & Porter Streets, and more were erected in her memory. Lowry made $58,000 in bequests to the WPSPCA in her 1908 will, including $10,000 "for erecting fountains in Philadelphia for horses and smaller animals," and $20,000 to establish the first animal shelter in the United States.

A crusade is being conducted in Philadelphia, and has been for six years past, by the members of the Women's Pennsylvania Society for the Prevention of Cruelty to Animals.

In 1906, Mrs. Bradbury Bedell, a member of the Women's Society who had long been active in seeking better conditions for animals in Philadelphia, and the late Mrs. A. L. Lowry, another woman who for years had sought successfully to aid in the comfort of the dumb beasts, debated over the filthiness of many of the water troughs located around the city. They made personal appeals in many cases to saloon keepers where they found trough conditions especially flagrant. Sometimes their efforts were successful, and again the women's appeals were passed by unnoticed.
Then the thought came to them that the society could in time establish sufficient stations to crush out the horse trough evil, and the campaign was started. In six years the results have been even more than the originators had anticipated. To-day the society owns forty fountains and troughs throughout the city. Conditions at many other fountains have been greatly improved, and horse owners have been aroused to the danger.

The city authorities have cheerfully aided the Women's Society here by furnishing the supply of water free for all the stations and in other ways. Many heads of stores and establishments which have a large supply of horses have also responded to the society's efforts on behalf of the horse. They know what it means from a commercial as well as a humane standpoint.

As of 1928 the WPSPCA still ran a veterinary hospital in the city, an animal refuge, owned and maintained 50 street fountains open all year, and put up additional seasonal horse-watering stations in the city from May through November.

=== Temperance organizations ===
During the season from April to November [the fountains] are so constantly patronized in busy portions of the city that water is at all times spilt over the surrounding pavement [...] –The Times, October 9, 1892

The Woman's Christian Temperance Union also commissioned fountains.

The local membership of the Sons of Temperance funded a drinking fountain, originally installed under a pergola at the 1876 Centennial Exposition and later moved to Independence Square in 1877. As advertised, it provided ICE WATER FREE TO ALL.

Also for the 1876 exposition the German-American sculptor Herman Kirn produced the elaborate Catholic Total Abstinence Union Fountain. This included five figures, Moses in the middle, and sixteen drinking fountains installed into granite pedestals.

== Notable drinking fountains ==
Some entries in this table overlap the entries in Drinking fountains in the United States. Neither table is an exhaustive list.

Name	Date	Image	Location	Sponsor/Designer	Material	Notes	Ref(s)
"First Fountain"	1854		Forbidden Drive, Wissahickon Valley (between Wises Mill Road & Bells Mill Road)	John Cook and Charles Magargé	white marble	Interpretive panel beside the "First Fountain": "Half a mile above Valley Green is a marble drinking fountain, erected in 1854—the first built in Philadelphia. It is supplied from a mountain spring, and the water is clear and cold. … John Cook and Charles Magargé presented this fountain to the Park Commission for public use." Sealed in 1957 because of water pollution	
Peace Fountain	1865		Fairmount Water Works, South Garden (west of Philadelphia Museum of Art)		brownstone	Peace Fountain, c.1870: A wall fountain set against a granite cliff. The inscription, "Peace June 1865," refers to the month in which the last fighting of the Civil War ended (in Texas).	
Washington Square Fountain	1869		Original: 7th & Walnut Streets (north side of Washington Square) Current: 615 S. Washington Square (south side of Washington Square)	Philadelphia Fountain Society	granite	Installed along the square's north side, 1869: "Outside the railing of this square, on a line with Seventh Street is a stone fountain surmounted by an eagle standing on a globe, which is noteworthy as being the first of these benevolent structures in providing which the Philadelphia Fountain Society has already earned the gratitude of thousands of thirsty men and suffering beasts." Relocated to the square's south side, 1916; Listed on the Philadelphia Register of Historic Places	
Tyler Memorial Fountain Horse Trough at 312 Arch Street	1869		Original: 500 block of Chestnut Street (in front of Independence Hall) Current: 312 Arch Street (in front of Arch Street Friends Meeting House)	Philadelphia Fountain Society	granite	Two PFS fountains were installed on Chestnut Street in front of Independence Hall, 1869. One was sponsored by Mrs. F. Tyler, the other by merchant John Wanamaker. "The State-House pumps were very near, if not exactly, upon the spot where fountains, surmounted by vases and intended to be decorated by flowers or shrubbery, were afterward placed by the Philadelphia Fountain Society."; The Wanamaker fountain was hit by a car in the 1940s, and removed. The Tyler fountain was relocated to 312 Arch Street, 1942; Listed on the Philadelphia Register of Historic Places	
Lemon Hill Spring (Marble Drinking Fountain) (Lion's Head Fountain)	circa 1870		Kelly Drive & Sedgeley Drive, East Fairmount Park		white marble	In the background (left) of the Lincoln Monument (1871): In 2020:	
In Aqua Sanitas Fountain	1870–1871		Martin Luther King Jr. Drive, West Fairmount Park (south of Falls Bridge)		granite	Inscription: "In Aqua Sanitas" ("In Water Health") "Drinking fountain and water trough, west side of West River drive, just south of Falls Bridge."	
Horse trough	1870–1871		Martin Luther King Jr. Drive & Montgomery Drive, West Fairmount Park		granite	"Drinking fountain and water trough, west side of West River drive, just south of Columbia Bridge."; No inscription; drinking fountain removed	
Catholic Total Abstinence Union Fountain	1874–1877		Fountain Drive, West Fairmount Park (west of Belmont Avenue)	Catholic Total Abstinence Union; Herman Kirn, designer and sculptor	granite	Erected on the fairgrounds of the 1876 Centennial Exposition, and dedicated July 4, 1876. Cost: $60,000; 16 drinking fountains—located on the four granite pedestals of the subordinate statues. Water was supplied from a reservoir atop Georges Hill. Georges Hill Reservoir is now the site of the Mann Music Center.	
Temperance Fountain	1876		Original: 1876 Centennial Exposition fairgrounds Current: in storage	Grand Division of the Sons of Temperance	cast iron	Installed under a 13-sided gazebo at the 1876 Centennial Exposition. Cost: $2,300. "At the close of the Centennial, the Sons of Temperance removed the fountain to Independence Square, where they supply it with ice at their own cost from June to October every year." Installed outside Independence Hall, 1877–1969. Placed in storage, 1969	
Lion's Head Fountain	1878		Original: Lincoln Drive, Wissahickon Valley Current: Kelly Drive, East Fairmount Park (south of Strawberry Mansion Bridge)	Fairmount Park Art Association; Mrs. Richard Davis Wood, donor	granite	In its original location, c.1895. Note the metal cup chained to the fountain: Relocated to Kelly Drive, year	
Ancient Roman Sarcophagus Kates Horse Trough	c.200–225 A.D. 1879		Forbidden Drive (west of intersection with Lincoln Drive)	Fairmount Park Art Association; Clarence S. Kates, donor	Italian white marble	Detail: Woman Riding a Sea-Centaur: A highly-carved ancient Roman sarcophagus, repurposed as a horse trough, and installed at MacFarland Spring, 1879. Destroyed by vandalism. Original dimensions: H. 28 in (71 cm) x W. 69 in (180 cm) x D. 26 in (66 cm); Dr. Donald White, of the University of Pennsylvania, dates it to "the first quarter of the 3rd century AD." "HORSE TROUGH. Presented by Clarence S. Kates. Accepted by the Commissioners of Fairmount Park, December 15th, 1878, and placed on the Wissahickon Drive, near the site of the Old Log Cabin."	
Orestes and Pylades Fountain	1884		33rd Street & Reservoir Drive, East Fairmount Park (Oxford Street Entrance)	Fairmount Park Art Association; Carl Johann Steinhäuser, sculptor (original marble); Herman Kirn, designer	bronze & granite	Steinhäuser's 1871 marble sculpture is located in the Palace Park, Karlsruhe, Germany. Kirn owned his late teacher's plaster model, from which this was cast in bronze. "Cast by Bureau Brothers, Philadelphia. Mounted on a pedestal of Richmond granite, with streams of water pouring from four bronze masks. Placed near Columbia Avenue Entrance to the East Park, south of the great Receiving Reservoir, in September, 1884."	
Catharine Thorn Memorial Fountain	1890		23rd Street, South Street & Grays Ferry Avenue	Women's Pennsylvania Society for the Prevention of Cruelty to Animals	granite	Inscription: "The Legacy of Catharine Thorn by the W. P. S. P. C. A."; Funded with $1000 Thorn left to the Society in her will. Installed at the center of a paved plaza bounded by South Street, 23rd Street and Grays Ferry Avenue. Now the center of a triangular pocket park	(Note: A mutton butcher who stands close by in the South Street market mentioned to a member of our Board that one very warm morning he counted the horses that came there to drink till he was too tired to count any longer, but he thought there must have been five hundred that drank that morning. If those horses could speak, and if they knew who was their benefactress, would they not bless Miss Thorne?)
Forepaugh Horse Trough	1895		Fairhill Square, 4th Street & Lehigh Avenue	Philadelphia Fountain Society; M. H. Gregg, maker	granite	Inscription: "Presented to the Philadelphia Fountain Society by a Lady"; Maker's mark:	
William Leonidas Springs Fountain	1899		Lincoln Drive, Wissahickon Valley (between Gypsy Lane & Forbidden Drive)	Jeanette S. Springs, donor	granite	"In October, 1899, a granite fountain was erected on the Wissahickon Drive at the Old Log Cabin spring by Miss Jeanette S. Springs, in memory of her father, William Leonidas Springs."; An exedra, with a pedimented wall fountain and horse trough at center and a drinking fountain at each end. Sealed in the 1940s because of water pollution	
Class of 1892 Drinking Fountain; The Scholar and the Football Player	1900		Quadrangle Dormitories; University of Pennsylvania; 37th & Spruce Streets	University of Pennsylvania Class of 1892, sponsor Alexander Stirling Calder, designer and sculptor	bronze & granite	Bronze; result of a $2500 fund raised by alumni; "the student appears in cap and gown, while, seated at his side, is the athlete, in football armor and with a 'pigskin' held firmly in his arm." Located under the North Arcade, between the Memorial Tower and the North Steps	
Grace and Beauty Fountain	c.1901		Horticultural Center, West Fairmount Park		white marble		
Bell H. Crump Fountain (Note: FOUNTAIN FOR ANIMALS - Mrs. Bell Crump Erects Public Convenience for Horses and Dogs What will be the largest drinking fountain for horses and dogs in Philadelphia will be opened this morning by the Pennsylvania Society for the Protection [sic] of Cruelty to Animals, on Broad street, at the intersection of Fairmount and Ridge avenues. The water will be turned on at 11 o'clock, by Mrs. Bell H. Crump, who presented the fountain to the society. All ambulances for the removal of living animals will be present and their horses will be the first to drink. Colonel M. Richards Muckle, president of the society, and Secretary F.B. Rutherford will accept the fountain on behalf of the organization. The fountain is composed of two solid blocks of granite. It is seven feet in diameter, three feet high and weighs nearly ten tons. Six horses can drink at one time, and there is a lower basin for dogs and birds. Around the upper margin the words, "Erected by Bell H. Crump, 1907," are inscribed.— The Philadelphia Inquirer, June 1, 1907, p. 2.)	1907		Original: Broad Street, Fairmount Avenue & Ridge Avenue Current: 350 E. Erie Avenue	Pennsylvania Society for the Prevention of Cruelty to Animals	granite	Installed at the intersection of Broad Street, Fairmount Avenue, and Ridge Avenue, 1907 (opposite the Divine Lorraine Hotel); Inscription: "Erected by Bell H. Crump 1907"; Relocated 1954 (Note: Broad St. Landmark Moves to New Site Ten-ton drinking fountain for horses and birds, installed in 1907, is removed from the intersection of Broad st. and Ridge and Fairmount avs. to make way for a traffic safety island. It will be placed in a new bird sanctuary in the back yard of the Pennsylvania SPCA shelter at 350 Erie av. Mobile units will serve thirsty animals along Ridge av. — The Philadelphia Evening Bulletin, December 2, 1954.); Now installed in front of the Pennsylvania SPCA Philadelphia Veterinary Clinic:	
Mary Rebecca Darby Smith Memorial Fountain; Rebecca at the Well	1908		Original: 12th & Spring Garden Streets (on median strip) Current: Horticultural Drive, West Fairmount Park	Philadelphia Fountain Society; John J. Boyle, sculptor	bronze & red granite	Funded with $5000 left to the Society by Smith, and based on her own design Inscription: "Drink and I will give thy camels drink also" Installed at 12th & Spring Garden Streets, 1908; Removed and placed in storage, 1922; Installed in West Fairmount Park, 1934	
Annie L. Lowry Memorial Fountain	1909		3rd & Bainbridge Streets (on median strip)	Women's Pennsylvania Society for the Prevention of Cruelty to Animals; John Sheehan's Marble & Granite Works, 3805-7 Woodland Ave., Phila., maker	granite	Erected at a cost of $1,500, with money left in Lowry's will. Inscriptions: "Drink Gentle Friends." "In Memory of Annie L. Lowry 1910." "W. P. S. P. C. A."; Dedicated by Caroline Earle White on May 12, 1909; Listed on the Philadelphia Register of Historic Places	(Note: Another striking exhibit was a granite fountain, a perfect reproduction in miniature of one which was erected earlier in the year from the funds so generously bequeathed for the purpose by our late co-worker Mrs. Annie L. Lowry. This model was the gift of Mr. John Sheehan who furnished the fountain above mentioned as well as the four new horse troughs placed during the year at 21st and Fairmount Avenue, at 69th and Terminal, Newtown Square and at Lansdowne.)
Annie L. Lowry Memorial Horse Trough	1910		Original: Fairmount Avenue & 21st Street? Current: 147 N. 2nd Street (in front of Fireman's Hall Museum)	Women's Pennsylvania Society for the Prevention of Cruelty to Animals; John Sheehan's Marble & Granite Works, 3805-7 Woodland Ave., Phila., maker	granite	Inscription: "The Gift of Mrs. A. L. Lowry."; Relocated to Engine Company #8, 2nd & Quarry Streets. The former firehouse is now the Fireman's Hall Museum: Listed on the Philadelphia Register of Historic Places	
Annie L. Lowry Memorial Horse Trough	1910		Original: 69th Street Terminal? Current: Ridge Avenue & Fountain Street (in front of Roxborough High School)	Women's Pennsylvania Society for the Prevention of Cruelty to Animals; John Sheehan's Marble & Granite Works, 3805-7 Woodland Ave., Phila., maker	granite	Inscription: "In Memory of Mrs. Annie L. Lowry. Women's Pa. S. P. C. A."	
Annie L. Lowry Memorial Horse Trough	1910		Original: Newtown Square? Current: Women's Animal Center, 3839 Richlieu Road, Bensalem	Women's Pennsylvania Society for the Prevention of Cruelty to Animals; John Sheehan's Marble & Granite Works, 3805-7 Woodland Ave., Phila., maker	granite	Relocated to E. Logan Street, east of Stenton Avenue, when? Relocated to Women's Animal Center, 2019	
Annie L. Lowry Memorial Horse Trough	1910		Original: Lansdowne? (Note: An early photograph shows a horse and trough at 12 N. Lansdowne Avenue, beside the Barker Building (at 14-16 N. Lansdowne). William H. Barker donated the land for Lansdowne's Lowry horse trough.) Current: Nitre Hall, 1682 Karakung Drive, Haverford	Women's Pennsylvania Society for the Prevention of Cruelty to Animals; John Sheehan's Marble & Granite Works, 3805-7 Woodland Ave., Phila., maker	granite	Inscription: In Memory of Mrs. Annie L. Lowry Women's Pa. S. P. C. A. Unveiled November 28, 1910; Relocated from Burmont & Glendale Roads to Powder Mill Valley Park, 1973; Relocated to grounds of Nitre Hall, 2019	
Edward Wetherill Memorial Fountain Horse Trough at 315 S 9th St	circa 1910		315 S. 9th Street (north of Pine Street)	Philadelphia Fountain Society	granite	Inscription: "A merciful man is merciful to his beast" (front); Inscription: "Edward Wetherill 1821 — 1908" (rear, in niche); Listed on the Philadelphia Register of Historic Places	
John Harrison Memorial Fountain	circa 1910		Kelly Drive, East Fairmount Park (south of Fountain Green Drive)		limestone	Inscription: "In memory of John Harrison 1834 — 1909" "The Harrison Memorial Lithia Spring and Water Trough"	
Annie L. Lowry Memorial Horse Trough	1913		Aldan Borough	Women's Pennsylvania Society for the Prevention of Cruelty to Animals; John Sheehan?	granite	Inscription: "Del. Co. S. P. C. A."	
Harriett S. French Fountain	1914		Belmont Avenue, West Fairmount Park (north of Montgomery Drive)	Women's Christian Temperance Union	granite	Inscriptions: "Harriet S. French, M.D." (street side); "W. C. T. U." (sidewalk side) "Harriet S. French Fountain, east side of Belmont avenue, about 50 yards north of Belmont [Montgomery] drive." Dr. Harriet Schneider French was president of the Women's Christian Temperance Union of Philadelphia.	
Lion's Head Drinking Fountain (Penn Museum)	circa 1915		University of Pennsylvania Museum (South Street sidewalk); 33rd & South Streets	Alexander Stirling Calder, sculptor	white marble & granite	In foreground, below the entrance steps:	
J. William White Memorial Drinking Fountain	1921		Rittenhouse Square (Walnut Street, between 18th & 19th Streets)	Rittenhouse Square Flower Market Association; Paul Philippe Cret, architect R. Tait McKenzie, sculptor	limestone & bronze	Dr. J. William White was a prominent surgeon and professor at the University of Pennsylvania.	
Sarah Cresson Memorial Horse Trough	1922		Original: Front Street & Erie Avenue Current: 3rd & Spring Garden Streets (NE corner)	Women's Pennsylvania Society for the Prevention of Cruelty to Animals	granite	Cresson bequeathed funds to the Women's PSPCA for three horse troughs, all installed in 1922.	
Sarah Cresson Memorial Horse Trough	1922		Broad Street, Oregon Avenue & Moyamensing Avenue	Women's Pennsylvania Society for the Prevention of Cruelty to Animals	granite	Inscription: "In Memoriam Sarah Cresson 1922"; Installed on a traffic island, north of Marconi Plaza	
Sarah Cresson Memorial Horse Trough	1922		NE corner Windrim Avenue & Broad Street	Women's Pennsylvania Society for the Prevention of Cruelty to Animals	granite	Inscription: "In Memoriam Sarah Cresson 1922"; This originally may have been installed on the adjacent traffic island, formed by Broad Street, Windrim Avenue and Ruscomb Street.	
Two Standing Birds Fountain (Penn Museum)	circa 1926–1929		University of Pennsylvania Museum (East Courtyard); 33rd & South Streets	Alexander Stirling Calder, sculptor Day & Klauder, architects	white marble		
Lemon Hill Pet Fountain			Sedgeley Drive, East Fairmount Park (north of Kelly Drive, beside Goldfish Pond Fountain)		granite	Inscription: "John IV. 13. Whosoever drinketh of this water shall thirst again"	

== Unlocated or destroyed drinking fountains ==
Name	Date	Image	Location	Designer/Sponsor	Material	Notes	Ref(s)
Iron Spring Fountain (Mineral Spring)	1871		Sedgeley Drive, east of Lemon Hill		cast iron		
Sedgeley Drinking Fountain	1871		Sedgeley Guard House		cast iron		
Rittenhouse Square Fountain	1872		19th & Walnut Streets (NW corner Rittenhouse Square, outside iron fence)	Philadelphia Fountain Society	cast iron	Removed by 1884; Church of the Holy Trinity later sponsored a drinking fountain, possibly at this site.	
Mercury Fountain	1872		18th & Walnut Streets (NE corner Rittenhouse Square, inside iron fence)	Philadelphia Fountain Society; J. Gillingham Fell, donor	cast iron	Cost: $3,500; Relocated to 42nd Street & Woodland Avenue, by 1884. No longer at that location.	
Danaide Fountain	1872		18th & Locust Streets (SE corner Rittenhouse Square, inside iron fence)	Philadelphia Fountain Society	cast iron	The fountain's four corbels each supported a (zinc?) figure of Theodor Kalide's Boy with Swan. Removed by 1884	
5 French drinking fountains	1878		East Fairmount Park	Fairmount Park Art Association	bronzed cast iron	"FIVE FOUNTAINS.* Cast at Paris, France, at the Foundry of Val D'Osne. Purchased by the Association, and erected with basins, hydraulic fitments, etc., at the expense of the Association, in the Park near the Lincoln Monument. Accepted by the Commissioners of Fairmount Park, December 8th, 1877. * Two have been placed near East River Drive below Girard Avenue Bridge."; All 5 drinking fountains were still in use in 1915.	
Norris Square Fountain	1891		Susquehanna Avenue (between Hancock Street & Howard Street)	Women's Christian Temperance Union		Inscriptions: "I will give unto him that is athirst of the Water of Life freely." "Erected by the Sixth Young Women's Christian Temperance Union, July, 1891."	
Annie L. Lowry Fountain	1906		John S. James Memorial Episcopal Church, 8th & Porter Streets	Women's Pennsylvania Society for the Prevention of Cruelty to Animals		Dedicated July 1, 1906; Church now demolished	
Annie L. Lowry Fountain	1906		Dock & Walnut Streets	Women's Pennsylvania Society for the Prevention of Cruelty to Animals	Barre granite	Dedicated October 22, 1906	
Harriett S. French Memorial Fountain	1909		Grays Ferry Avenue, 25th Street & Christian Street (opposite Philadelphia Naval Asylum)	Women's Christian Temperance Union	granite	Inscription: "Erected to the glory of God, by the Harriet S. French Young Women's Christian Temperance Union and the Loyal Temperance Legion of Holy Trinity Memorial chapel" "The fountain is 8 feet 4 inches high, and has bowls for both horses and dogs, and is provided with an ample ice reservoir, which will be kept full by the Union and school."	
Archbishop Ryan Memorial Watering Station	1911		NE corner Broad & Arch Streets	Women's Pennsylvania Society for the Prevention of Cruelty to Animals		Dedicated June 6, 1911; Funded by a bequest from Annie L. Lowry; In operation seasonally, from June to September. Attendants brought individual pails of water to the horses (to discourage the spread of glanders). Featured a drive-thru shower for cooling the horses.	
Martin Hetzel Memorial Fountain	1915		Lehigh Avenue & Waterloo Street	Women's Pennsylvania Society for the Prevention of Cruelty to Animals	granite	Dedicated September 1, 1915	
Emmeline Reed Bedell Memorial Fountain	1920		Dock Street and Delaware Avenue	Women's Pennsylvania Society for the Prevention of Cruelty to Animals	granite	Bedell was "founder of the Auxiliary, and who twenty-five years ago established the first public watering places in this city. It bears the inscription, "In Memory of Emmeline Reed Bedell, 1920," carved in the granite at the base."	

== See also ==
- National Humane Alliance fountains
- Temperance fountain

== Sources ==
- Fairmount Park Art Association (1974). Sculpture of a City: Philadelphia's Treasures in Bronze and Stone. New York: Walker Publishing Company. OCLC 1151158386.
- Finkel, Kenneth; Oyama, Susan (1988). Philadelphia Then and Now: 60 Sites Photographed in the Past and Present. New York: Library Company of Philadelphia; Dover Publications. ISBN 978-0-486-25790-7. OCLC 1150971538.
- Greene, Ann Norton (2008). Horses at Work: Harnessing Power in Industrial America. Cambridge, Massachusetts: Harvard University Press. ISBN 978-0-674-03790-8. OCLC 1149441024.
- McClelland, Jim (December 22, 2004). Fountains of Philadelphia: A Guide. Stackpole Books. ISBN 978-0-8117-3191-1.
- Philadelphia and Its Environs: Illustrated. J. B. Lippincott & Co. 1876.
- "The Evolution of the Horse Drinking Fountain". The National Humane Review. American Humane Association: 150–151. 1913.
- Scharf, John Thomas; Westcott, Thompson (1884). History of Philadelphia, 1609–1884. L. H. Everts & Company.
- Smith, Carl (April 17, 2013). City Water, City Life: Water and the Infrastructure of Ideas in Urbanizing Philadelphia, Boston, and Chicago. University of Chicago Press. ISBN 978-0-226-02265-9.
