= Edward Wetherill =

American abolitionist (1821–1908)

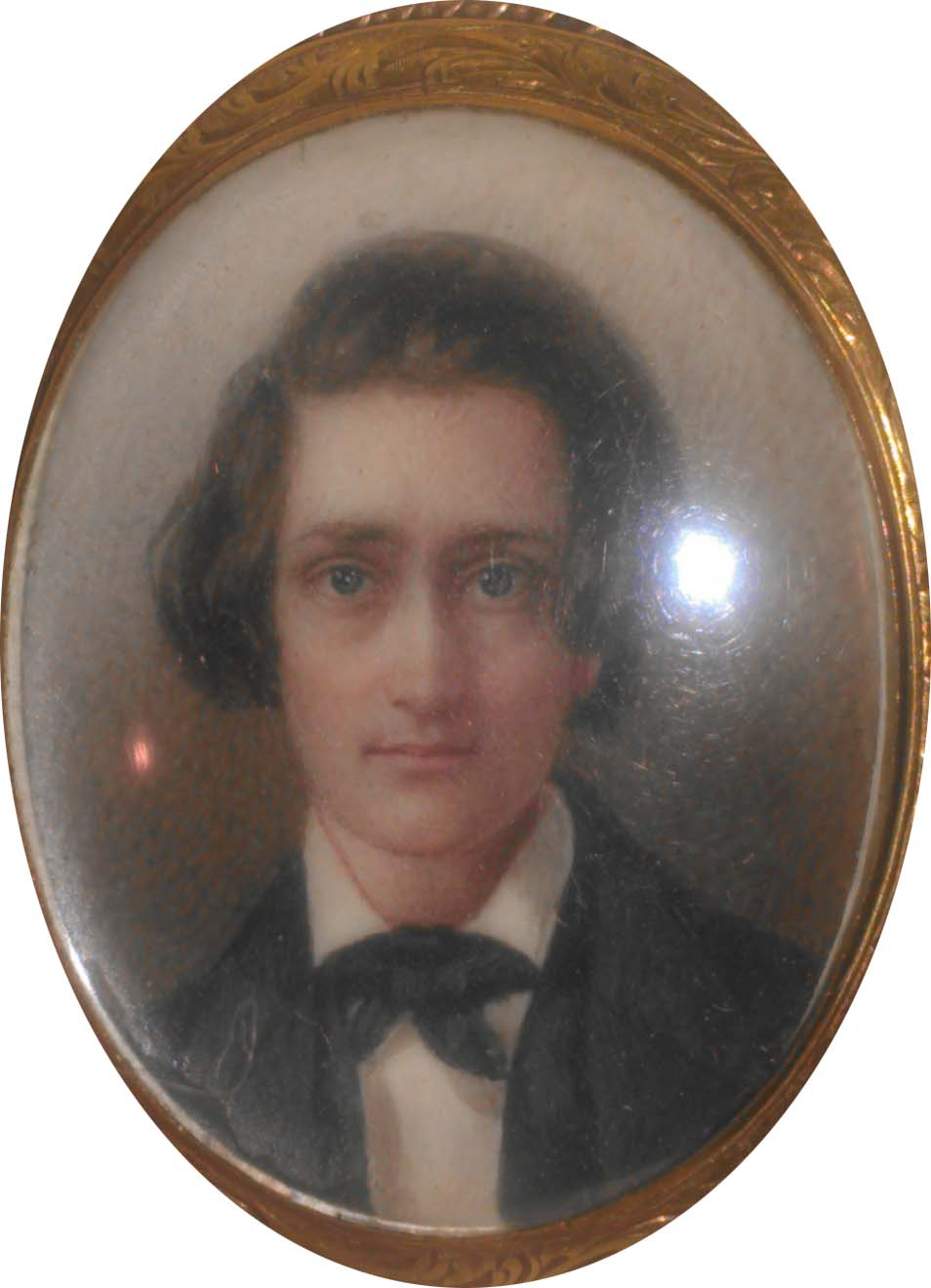
- portrait by George Hewitt Cushman, Wetherill's brother in law
- Died: 2 October 1908
- Occupation: Abolitionist

Edward Wetherill (1821–1908) was a prominent abolitionist in Philadelphia, a staunch Quaker, son of John Wetherill and Susan Garrison and grandson of Samuel Wetherill founder of the Free Quakers. He, along with his family and wife, Anna Thorpe Wetherill, helped African-American slaves escape from the South and found work for them in the North from the 1850s through the Civil War.

Their homes, at 911 Clinton St. in the Washington Square West section of Philadelphia and at Chalkley Hall, an English Georgian-style country manor on the outskirts of Philadelphia in Frankford, were used as shelters along the Underground Railroad. Edward's father, John Wetherill purchased Chalkley Hall in 1817 and both Edward and his siblings were born there. During John Wetherill's time at Chalkley Hall, he hosted many gatherings attended by American leaders and writers, including Thomas Jefferson and John Leaf Whittier, who even wrote a poem about the mansion entitled “Chalkley Hall”.

Edward Wetherill

Later, Edward and Anna would host dinners with well-known abolitionists, including Harriet Beecher Stowe, William Lloyd Garrison and Thomas Garrett (who helped Harriet Tubman escape) and leading suffragists like Lucretia Mott and Julia Ward Howe.

Towards the turn of the century, the Wetherills vacated the home due to railroad encroachments and donated Chalkley Hall to be used as a country home for a College Settlement for single mothers, children and the poor. Over the years, the home fell into disrepair and eventually, the home was purchased by and demolished in 1954 to expand train lines. Before the home was demolished, several architectural structures were donated to museums, including the stairway between the second and third floors to the State Museum of Pennsylvania and the main granite, iron and wood entry doorway to the Metropolitan Museum of Art. The doorway is currently on display in the Met's gallery 756. Of course like all stately homes, it was rumored to have a “little gray lady” ghost roaming its halls.

Edward and Anna had five daughters, Edith, Marian, Blanche, Irma and Cora. Marian died by suicide in 1922 and Cora never married. Edith, Irma and Blanche continued their parents' activism and started their own families. Rebecca Wetherill, Edward's sister and a frequent correspondent with Harriet Beecher Stowe, saved family records on Chalkley Hall and their abolitionist activities. She also compiled scrapbooks with tributes to Queen Victoria for Edward's daughter Blanche and they can be found on view at the Historical Society of Pennsylvania in the Edward Wetherill Collection.

As a tribute to his abolitionist work, in 1913 a horse fountain was dedicated in his memory and located at the intersection of Clinton and S. 9th Streets in Philadelphia.
