= Knights of Father Mathew =

Catholic temperance society

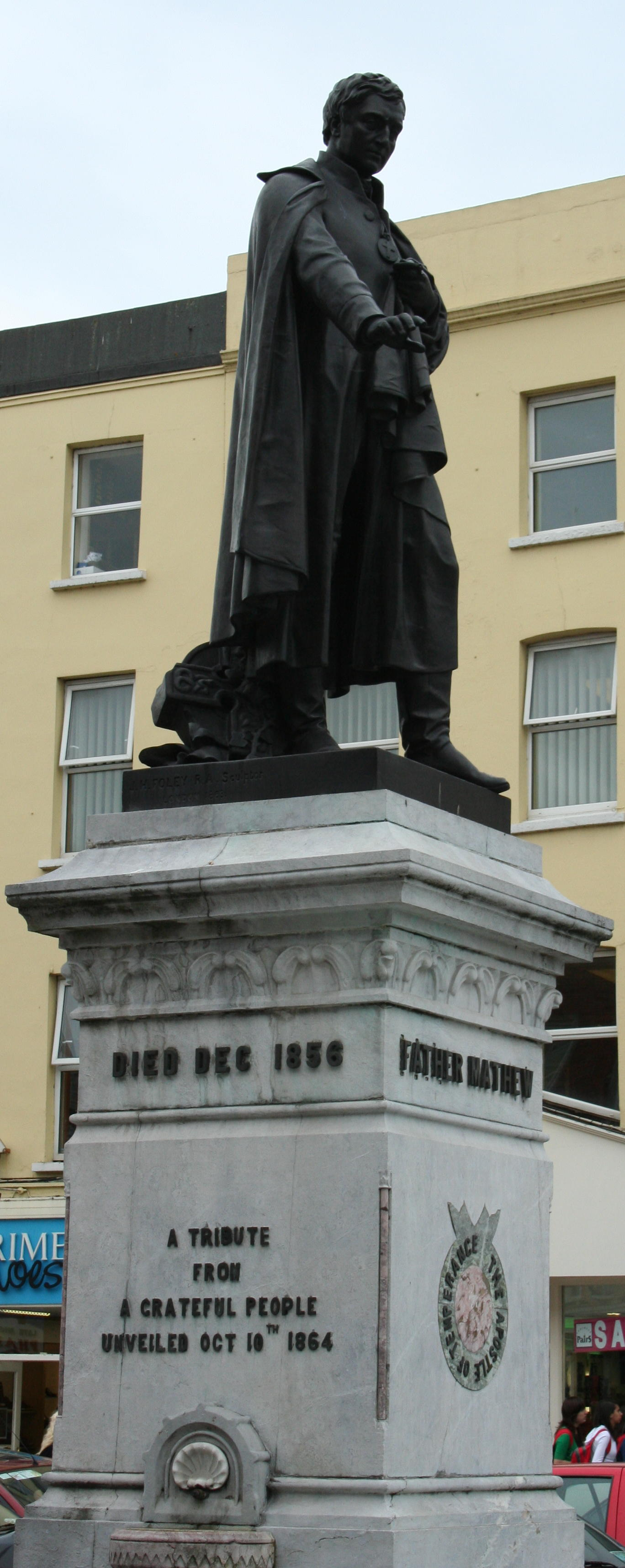
Statue of Father Mathew in St. Patrick's Street, Cork, Ireland

The Knights of Father Mathew was a Catholic temperance society founded by Fr Theobald Matthew in Ireland which promoted complete abstinence from intoxicating liquors.

== History ==
It was founded in Cork in 1838 by Theobald Mathew, a Capuchin friar – generally known as Father Mathew. Under his influence, branches the organization spread throughout Ireland, though it was badly disrupted by the Great Irish Famine of 1846 to 1849. Father Mathew also travelled in England and Scotland (1842) and in the United States (1849 to 1851) to preach temperance. It is estimated that 7,000,000 took the pledge of abstinence under his influence.

Father Mathew began his work in the U.S. in 1849, at which time he was entertained by the President and granted a seat within the bar of the Senate and on the floor of the House. Only one foreigner, General Lafayette, had previously been given that honor. He was also lauded on the occasion by famous statesman Henry Clay.

Father Mathew spent two and a half years in the U.S., traveled 37,000 miles, visited 25 states, administered the temperance pledge in over 300 cities and towns to an estimated more than 500,000 people.

The Knights of Father Mathew organization in the U.S. was established in St. Louis, Missouri, on 26 April, 1872. At this time, it was an fraternal society limited to Irish immigrants.

In 1881, it added life insurance as a benefit available to members. Chapters or “councils” were permitted to organize branches of Catholic women that were called "Ladies' Auxiliaries of the Knights of Father Mathew." The Ladies' Auxiliaries were especially active in promoting temperance among children. Both the Knights of Father Mathew affiliated with the Catholic Total Abstinence Union of America in 1895, as did the Ladies' Auxiliaries of the Knights of Father Mathew.

Some members were buried with KFM or K. of F. M. – Knights of Father Mathew – or LAKFM – Ladies Auxiliary of the Knights of Father Mathew on their tombstones.

=== 1900s ===
In early 1900s expanded to include non-Irish Catholics, especially second-generation English-speaking German immigrants In 1915, renamed the Knights and Ladies of Father Matthew when women were admitted to full membership. Membership declined in the 1920s and the organization disbanded in 1931.

== See also ==
- Temperance organizations
