= Father Mathew =

Irish teetotalist reformer (1790–1856)

The Reverend Theobald Mathew OFM Cap
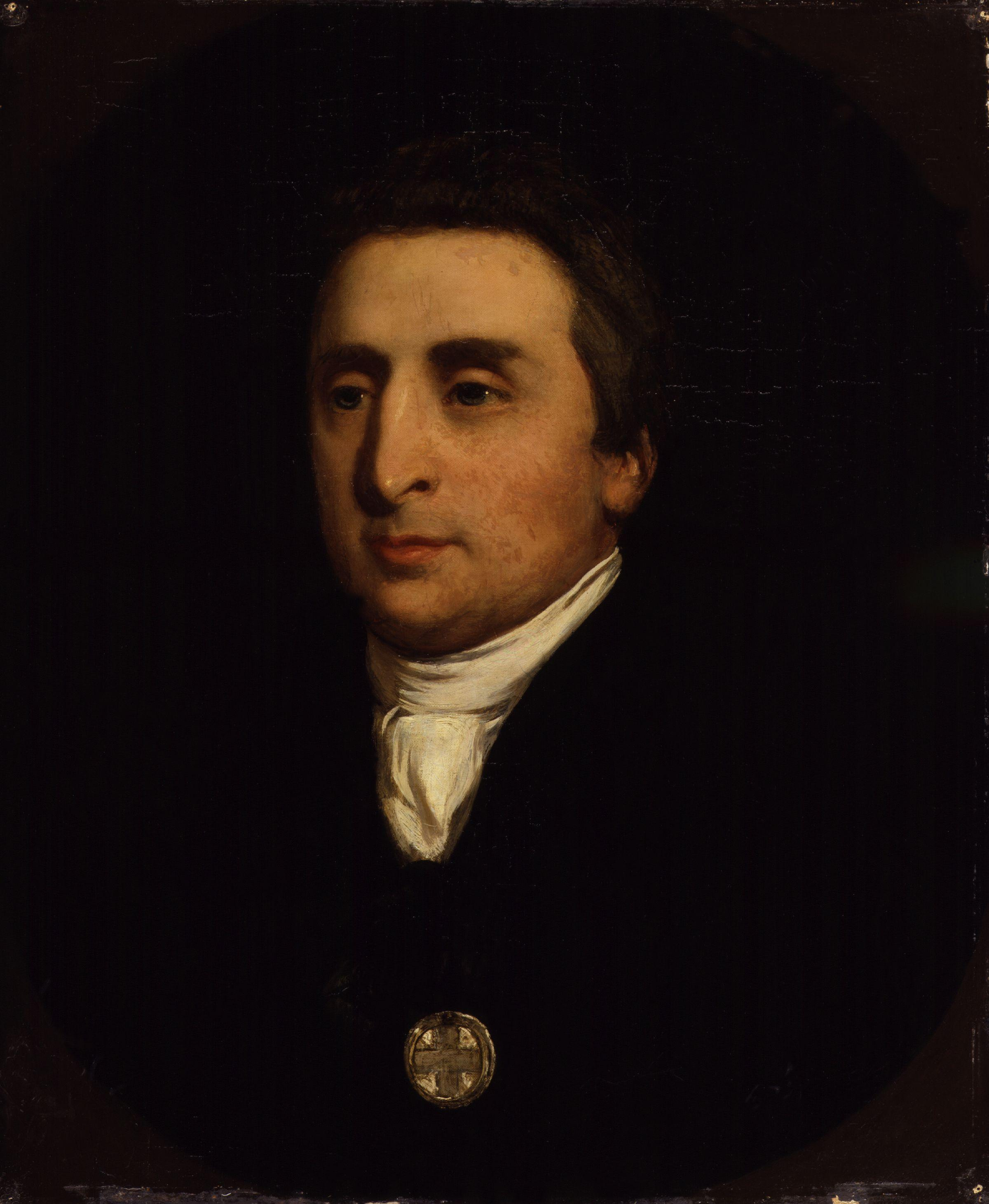
- Theobald Mathew, by Edward Daniel Leahy

Personal details
- Born: 10 October 1790 Thomastown, County Tipperary, Ireland
- Died: 8 December 1856 (aged 66) Queenstown, County Cork, Ireland
- Denomination: Catholic

Theobald Mathew (10 October 1790 – 8 December 1856) was an Irish Catholic priest, member of the Order of Friars Minor Capuchin, and teetotalist reformer, popularly known as Father Mathew. He was born at Thomastown, near Golden, County Tipperary, on 10 October 1790, to James Mathew and his wife Anne, daughter of George Whyte, of Cappaghwhyte. Of the family of the Earls Landaff (his father, James, was a first cousin of Thomas Mathew, father of the first earl), he was a kinsman of the clergyman Arnold Mathew.

He received his schooling in County Kilkenny, then moved for a short time to Maynooth. From 1808 to 1814 he studied in Dublin, where in the latter year he was ordained to the priesthood. Having entered the Capuchin order, after a brief period of service at Kilkenny, he joined the mission in Cork.

Statues of Mathew stand on St. Patrick's Street, Cork, by J. H. Foley (1864), and on O'Connell Street, Dublin, by Mary Redmond (1893). There is a Fr. Mathew Bridge in Limerick City, named after the temperance reformer when it was rebuilt between 1844 and 1846. The Capuchin church in Cork, Holy Trinity, stands on Father Mathew Quay and was commissioned by him.

== Total Abstinence Society ==
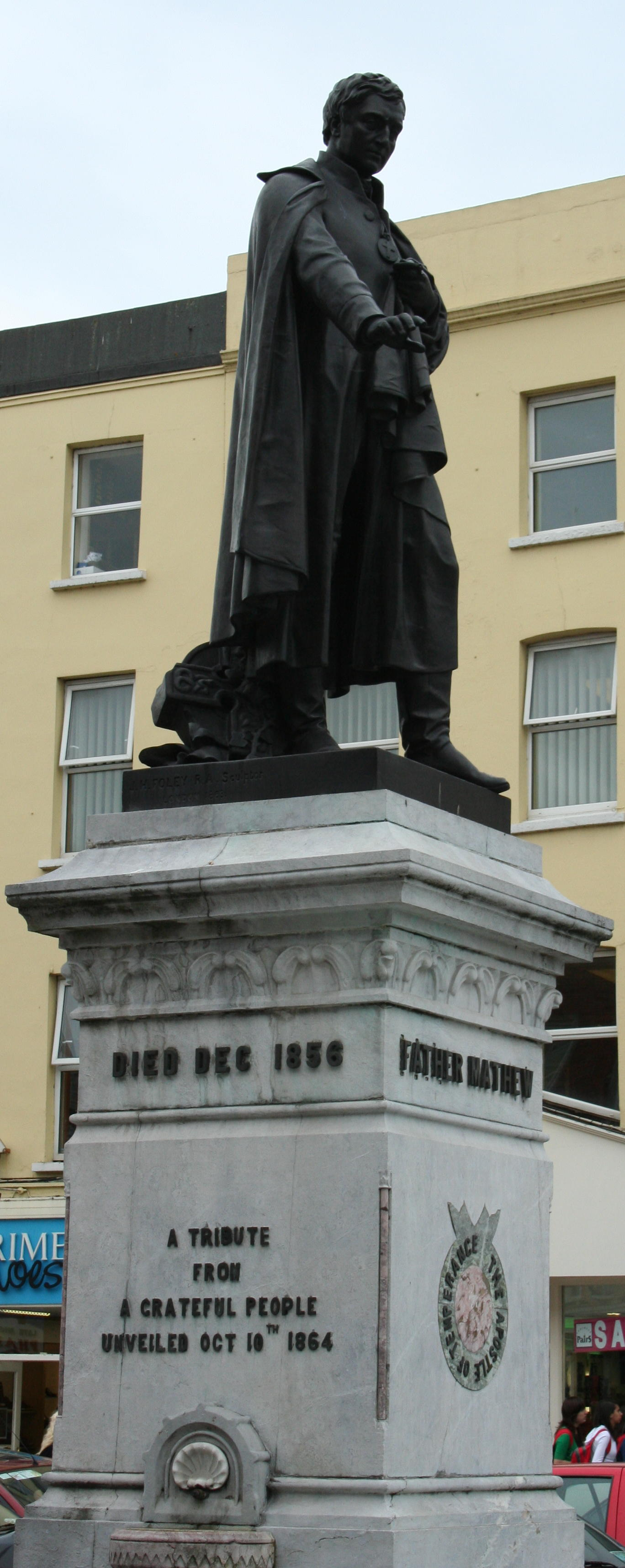
Father Mathew monument in St. Patrick's Street, Cork

The movement with which his name is associated began on 10 April 1838 with the establishment of the "Knights of Father Mathew", which in less than nine months enrolled no fewer than 150,000 names. Over time this became the Catholic Total Abstinence Society. It rapidly spread to Limerick and elsewhere, and some idea of its popularity may be formed from the fact that at Nenagh 20,000 persons are said to have taken the pledge in one day, 100,000 at Galway in two days, and 70,000 in Dublin in five days. At its height, just before the Great Famine of 1845–49, his movement enrolled some 3 million people, or more than half of the adult population of Ireland. In 1844, he visited Liverpool, Manchester and London with almost equal success.

While Father Mathew founded the temperance movement in Ireland, it was part of a wider effort to improve the life chances of poor labourers. Teetotalism was first organised by the Preston Temperance Society, founded in 1833, and the organisations that followed had a huge worldwide impact in the 1800s.

A biography, written shortly after his death, credits Mathew's work with a reduction in Irish crime figures of the era:

The number of homicides, which was 247 in 1838, was only 105 in 1841. There were 91 cases of 'firing at the person' reported in 1837, and but 66 in 1841. The 'assaults on police' were 91 in 1837, and but 58 in 1841. Incendiary fires, which were as many as 459 in 1838, were 390 in 1841. Robberies, thus specially reported, diminished from 725 in 1837, to 257 in 1841. The decrease in cases of 'robbery of arms' was most significant; from being 246 in 1837, they were but 111 in 1841. The offence of 'appearing in arms' showed a favourable diminution, falling from 110 in 1837, to 66 in 1841. The effect of sobriety on 'faction fights' was equally remarkable. There were 20 of such cases in 1839, and 8 in 1841. The dangerous offence of 'rescuing prisoners', which was represented by 34 in 1837, had no return in 1841!
The number committed to jail fell from 12,049 in 1839 to 9,875 by 1845. Sentences of death fell from 66 in 1839 to 14 in 1846, and transportations fell from 916 to 504 over the same period.

== In the United States ==
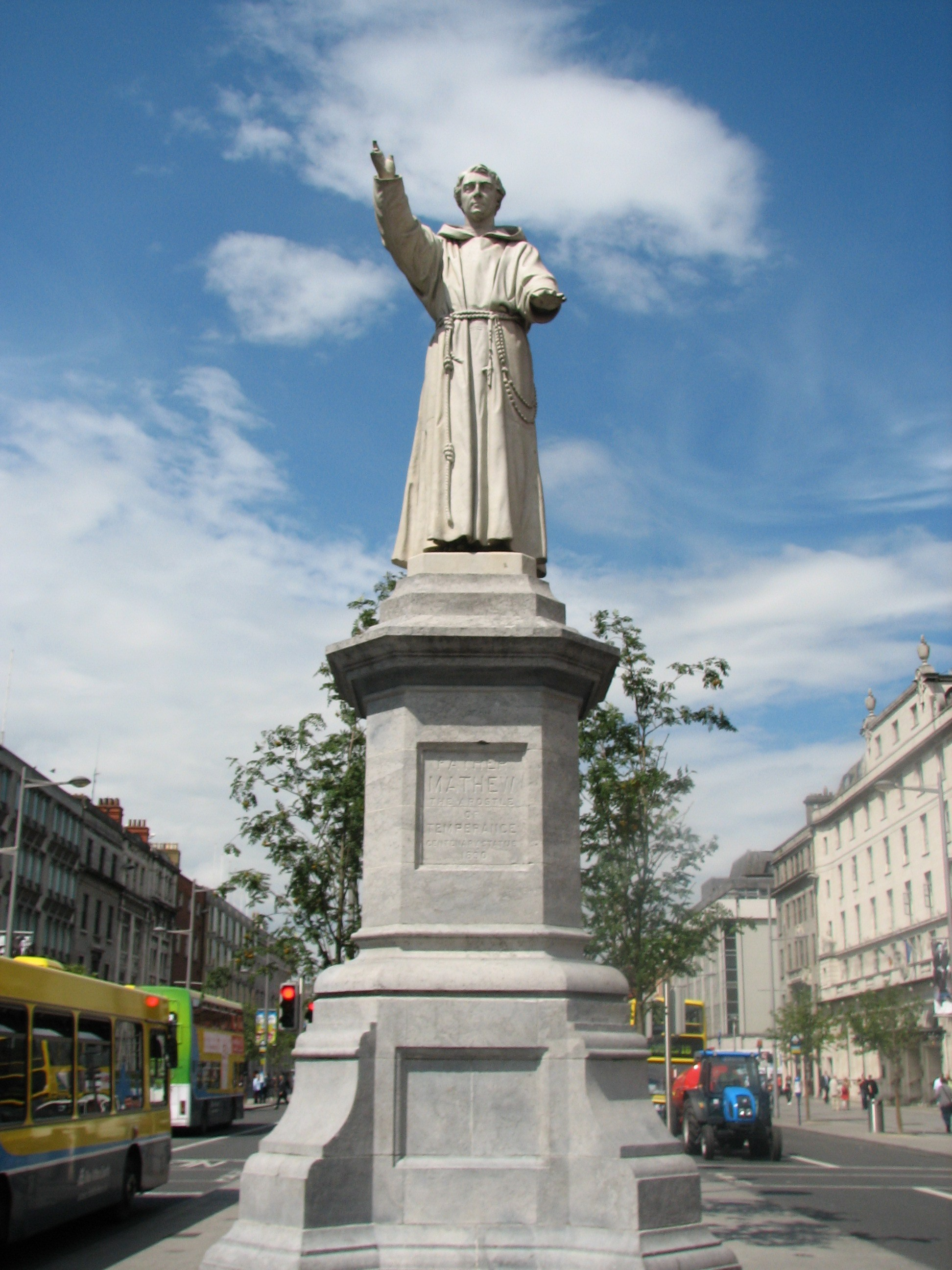
The Father Mathew monument in its former location on Dublin's O'Connell Street

Mathew visited the United States in 1849, returning in 1851. While there, he found himself at the centre of the abolitionist debate. Many of his hosts, including John Hughes, the Roman Catholic Archbishop of New York, were anti-abolitionists and wanted assurances that Mathew would not stray outside his remit of battling alcohol consumption. But Mathew had signed a petition (along with 60,000 Irish people, including Daniel O'Connell) encouraging the Irish in the US not to partake in slavery in 1841 during Charles Lenox Remond's tour of Ireland.

In order to avoid upsetting these anti-abolitionist friends in the US, he snubbed an invitation to publicly condemn chattel slavery, sacrificing his friendship with that movement. He defended his position by pointing out that there was nothing in the scripture that prohibited slavery. He was condemned by many on the abolitionist side, including the former slave and abolitionist Frederick Douglass who had received the pledge from Mathew in Cork in 1845. Douglass felt "grieved, humbled and mortified" by Mathew's decision to ignore slavery while campaigning in the US and "wondered how being a Catholic priest should inhibit him from denouncing the sin of slavery as much as the sin of intemperance". Douglass felt it was his duty to now "denounce and expose the conduct of Father Mathew".

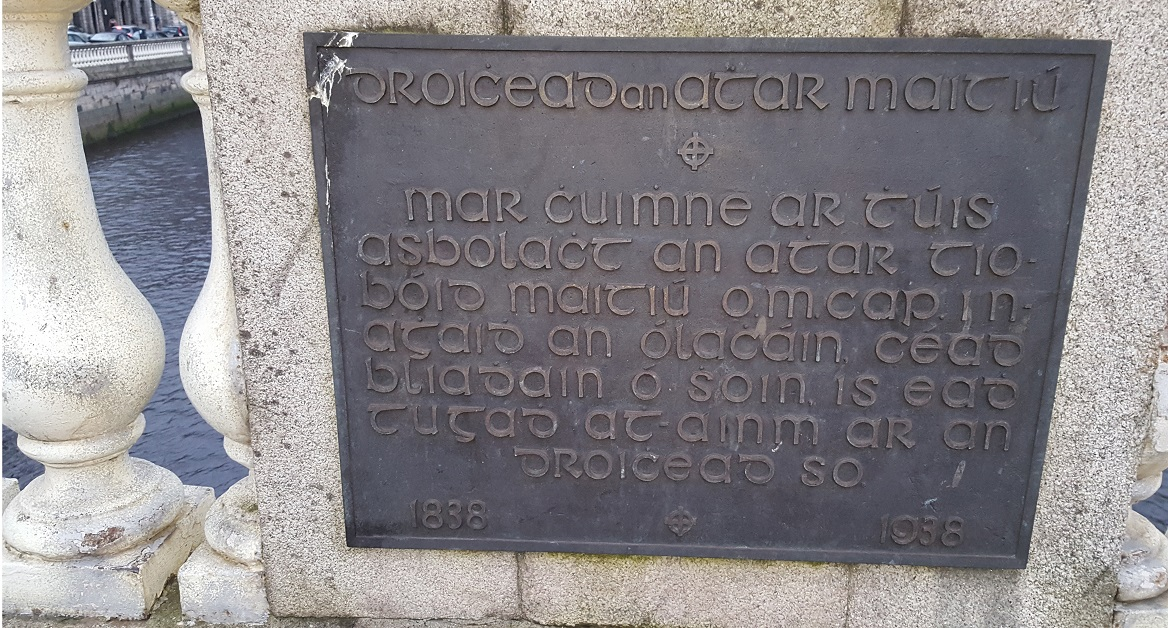
Commemoration plaque of Father Mathew Bridge over the River Liffey

== Death ==
Mathew died on 8 December 1856 in Queenstown, County Cork (present-day Cobh), and was interred in St. Joseph's Cemetery, Cork, a cemetery which he had himself established.

== Tributes ==
=== Father Mathew's Tower ===
In 1868, at his own expense, landowner William O'Connor built a castellated neo-Gothic stone tower to commemorate Father Mathew on what was then called Mount Patrick and is now known as Tower Hill in Glounthaune outside Cork city. The tower, which was subsequently converted into a private residence, retains a number of its original features, including a life-sized statue of Father Mathew in the tower's garden. Around 2014, the refurbished and modernised tower was sold for approximately one million euro. An eyewitness description of the tower, from the summer of 1848, is included in Asenath Nicholson's Annals of the Famine in Ireland in 1847, 1848 and 1849.

=== Postage stamps ===
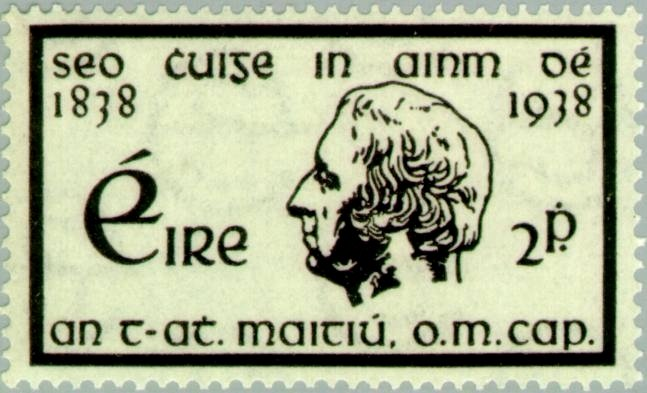
Theobald Mathew postage stamp, 1938

On 1 July 1938, the Irish Department of Posts and Telegraphs released a set of postage stamps valued at two and three pence commemorating Mathew.

== See also ==
- Catholic temperance movement
