= Drinking fountains in the United States =

This is a history and list of drinking fountains in the United States. A drinking fountain, also called a water fountain or bubbler, is a fountain designed to provide drinking water. It consists of a basin with either continuously running water or a tap. The drinker bends down to the stream of water and swallows water directly from the stream. Drinking water fountains are most commonly found in heavy usage areas like public amenities, schools, airports, and museums.

== History ==
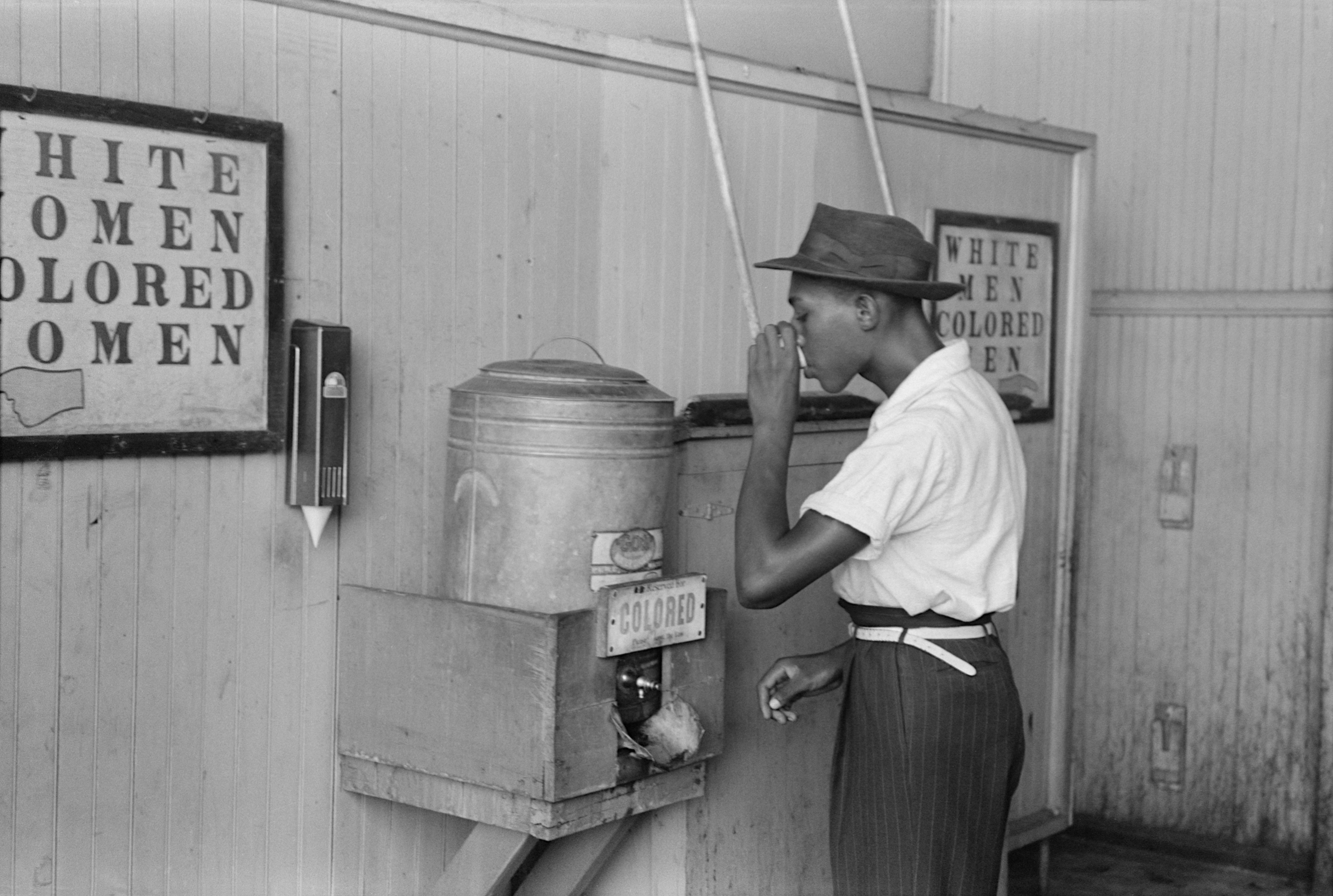
An African-American man drinking at a "colored" drinking fountain in a streetcar terminal in Oklahoma City, 1939.

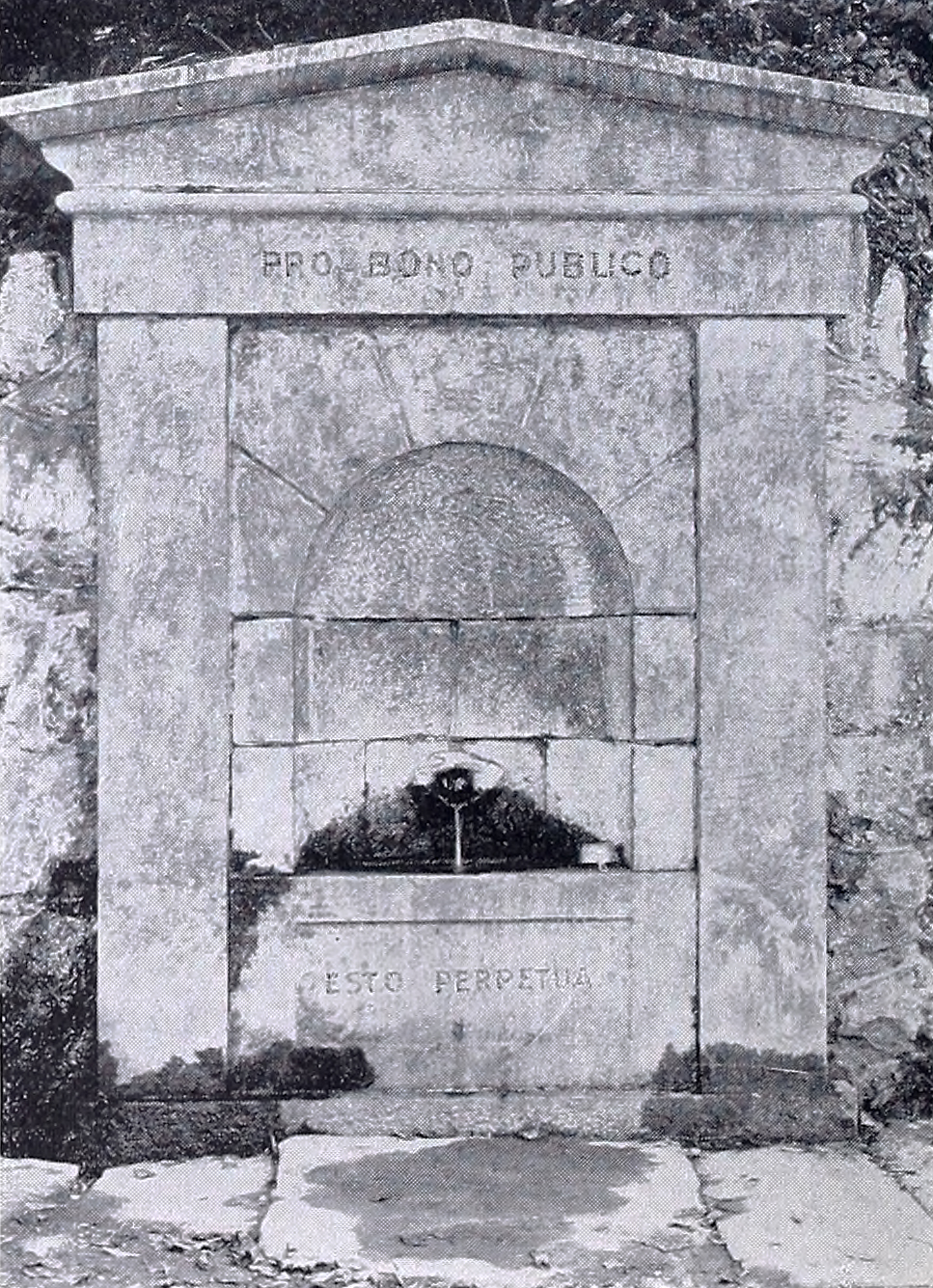
"Upon a slab above the niche are cut the words 'Pro bono publico'; beneath the basin these, 'Esto perpetua'."

The first of the drinking fountains in Philadelphia may rank among the earliest in the country. Constructed in 1854, it was explicitly labeled "For the public good", it had respectable neo-classical detailing, and it was privately funded, all of which would set a pattern. It was described in 1884 as:

The first fountain, so called, stands upon the side of the road on the west side of the Wissahickon … It is claimed that this is the first drinking fountain erected in the county of Philadelphia outside of the Fairmount Water-Works. A clear, cold, mountain spring is carried by a spout, covered with a lion's head, from a niche in a granite front, with pilasters and pediment into a marble basin. The construction bears the date 1854 … Upon a slab above the niche are cut the words "Pro bono publico"; beneath the basin these, "Esto perpetua".

In the late 1860s, a mix of progressive organizations and private philanthropists began funding purpose-built, public water fountains. Early examples include the first fountain funded by the new American Society for the Prevention of Cruelty to Animals in 1867, in Union Square in New York City, and the work of the Philadelphia Fountain Society beginning in April 1869, whose fountains served people, horses, and dogs. Those Philadelphia fountains immediately proved their "utility and absolute necessity;" by September 1869 the Fountain Society had constructed 12, and the newly-founded Pennsylvania branch of the ASPCA had built another five. As of 1880, the Philadelphia Fountain Society alone maintained 50 fountains serving approximately 3 million people and 1 million horses and other animals.

The ASPCA had been founded in 1866 in New York, and spread quickly to active branches in Philadelphia and other cities. One of its concerns was the difficulty of finding fresh water for work horses in urban areas. Combination drinking fountains that provided a bubbler for people and a water trough for horses, and sometimes a lower basin for dogs, became popular. In particular, over 120 National Humane Alliance fountains were donated to communities across the United States between 1903 and 1913. The fountains were the gift of philanthropist Hermon Lee Ensign.

Also working in parallel were various organizations of the Temperance Movement, who advocated abstinence from alcohol, and saw providing free fresh water as an attractive alternative. furthering its cause. The Woman's Christian Temperance Union, founded in 1874, sponsored temperance fountains in towns and cities across the United States. The Sons of Temperance built an elaborate and popular drinking fountain for Philadelphia's 1876 Centennial Exposition, later moved close to Independence Hall, that dispensed ice water. Henry D. Cogswell, a dentist and temperance crusader who made a fortune in San Francisco real estate, sponsored (and designed) dozens of artistic fountains, some of which were adorned with a statue of himself.

One myth claims that drinking fountains were first built in the United States in 1888 by the then-small Kohler Water Works (now Kohler Company) in Kohler, Wisconsin. However, no company by that name existed at the time.

Privately sponsored drinking fountains were often commissioned as works of art. Sculptors such as Karl Bitter, Alexander Stirling Calder, Gutzon Borglum and Daniel Chester French; and architects such as Paul Philippe Cret, Frederick Law Olmsted and Henry Hobson Richardson collaborated on them. These were frequently created as memorials to individuals, serving an ongoing utilitarian purpose as well as an artistic one.

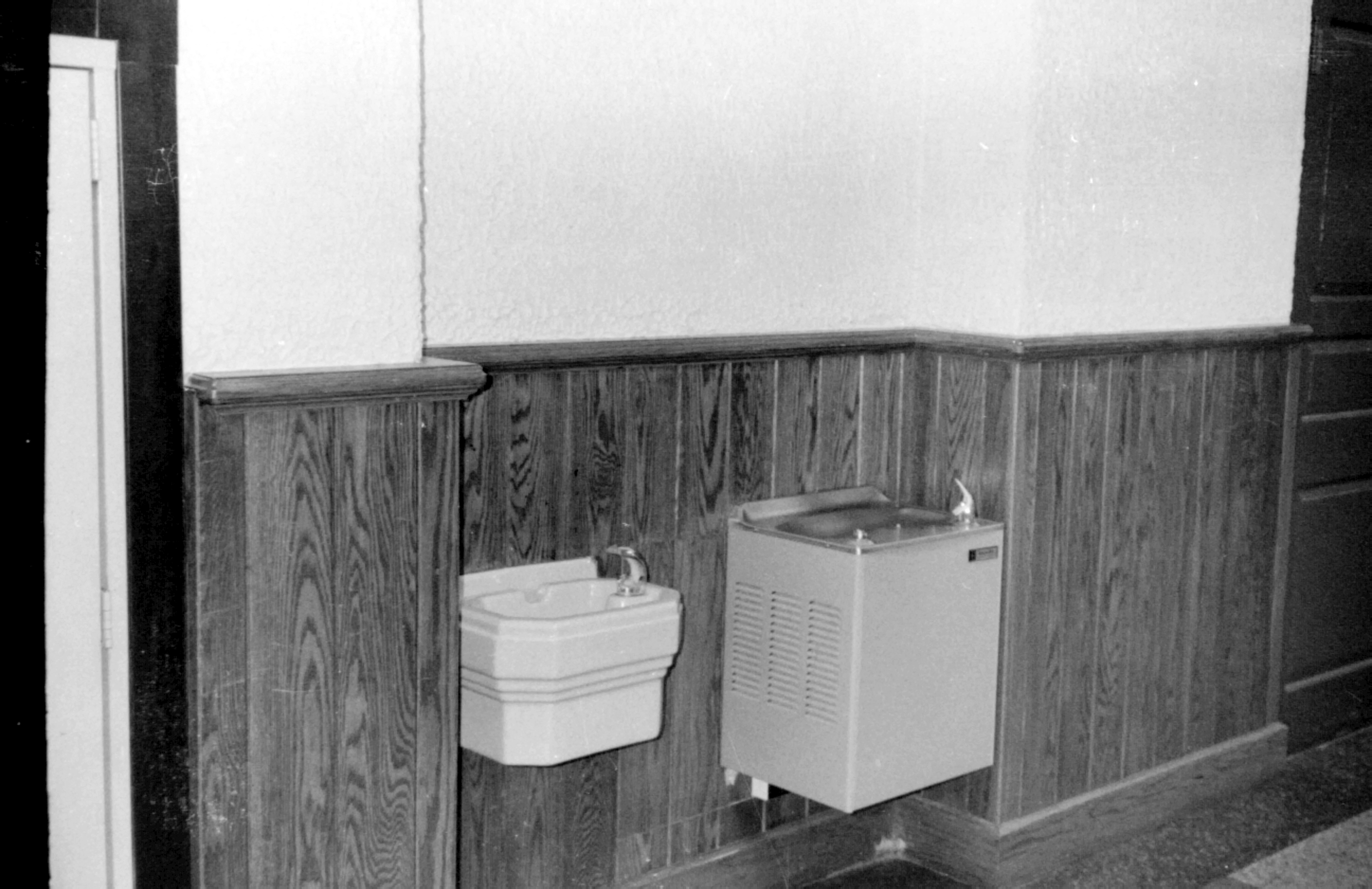
Two drinking fountains side by side in a New York State middle school, 1990s

In the United States, segregation of public facilities including but not limited to water fountains due to race, color, religion, or national origin was abolished by the Civil Rights Act of 1964. Prior to this, racially segregated water fountains with those for black people in worse condition than those for white people were common.

== List of notable drinking fountains (organized by state) ==
Name	Location	Image	Sculptor	Other designers	Year	Medium	Usage	Notes
Lotta's Fountain; Lotta Crabtree Fountain	California; Market, Geary & Kearny Streets, San Francisco				1875	cast iron	For people	The fountain in 1905. Actress Lotta Crabtree donated the fountain. Added to the National Register of Historic Places in 1975.
Statue of Benjamin Franklin (San Francisco); Temperance Fountain; Cogswell Historical Monument	California; Washington Square, San Francisco		Unknown	Henry D. Cogswell	1879 relocated 1904	bronze base: granite	For people	Originally located at Market & Kearny Streets. Altered. No longer a fountain.
Erskine Memorial Fountain	Grant Park, Atlanta		J. Massey Rhind		1896 relocated 1912	Bronze	For people	Originally located at what is now Hardy Ivy Park
Nathaniel Wheeler Memorial Fountain	Connecticut; Bridgeport		Gutzon Borglum		1913	Mermaid: bronze Basin & 3 horse troughs: granite	For people and horses	Added to the National Register of Historic Places in 1985.
National Humane Alliance Fountain	Connecticut; Derby Greenway, Derby				1906 restored 2007		For people, horses and dogs	More than 120 National Humane Alliance Fountains were installed in communities across the United States between 1903 and 1913.
Pope Fountain; Albert A. Pope Memorial Fountain	Connecticut; Pope Park, Hartford		Lee Lawrie	George W. Keller, architect	1913 relocated 1964		For people and horses	Includes a bronze portrait medallion of Albert A. Pope.
Dancing Bears Fountain; Children's Fountain	Connecticut; Center Park, Manchester		Albert Humphreys	Pomponian Bronze Works, foundry	1909		For people	
Carrie Welton Fountain "Horse on The Green"	Connecticut; The Green, Waterbury		Karl Gerhardt		1888	Horse: bronze Base: granite	For people and horses	
Woman's Christian Temperance Union Fountain (Rehoboth Beach, Delaware)	Delaware; Rehoboth Avenue & Boardwalk, Rehoboth Beach				1929	granite	For people	Added to the National Register of Historic Places in 1977.
Temperance Fountain (Washington, D.C.); Cogswell Fountain	District of Columbia; 7th Street & Indiana Avenue, N.W., Washington, D.C.		Unknown	Henry D. Cogswell	1882-84	Sculptures: bronze Base & canopy: granite	For people and horses	Water flowed from the dolphins' mouths. Added to the National Register of Historic Places in 2007.
U. S. Capitol Grounds Drinking Fountain	District of Columbia; United States Capitol Grounds, Washington, D.C.			Frederick Law Olmsted, architect	1874		For people	
Horse Show Fountain (Wright-Bock Fountain)	Illinois; Oak Park		Richard Bock	Frank Lloyd Wright, architect	1909 replica 1969	Poured concrete	For people, horses and dogs	The original fountain deteriorated and was used to create a replica. It was erected about 100 ft from the original's site.
Woman's Christian Temperance Union Fountain (Bloomington, Indiana)	Indiana; Monroe County Courthouse, Bloomington				1913		For people	
Murphy Memorial Drinking Fountain	Indiana; Carroll County Courthouse, Delphi		Myra Reynolds Richards		1918	Sculpture: bronze Barre granite	For people	Richards posing with her sculpture.
Woman's Christian Temperance Union Fountain (Shenandoah, Iowa)	Iowa; Clarinda & Sheridan Streets, Shenandoah				1912	cast iron	For people, dogs and birds	Added to the National Register of Historic Places in 1984.
Ellis Fountain	Kentucky; Old Fayette County Courthouse, Lexington		William Ingram	Lexington Granite Company	1921	Sculptures: bronze granite	For people and dogs	
Gumbel Memorial Fountain	Louisiana; Audubon Park, New Orleans		Isidore Konti		1918		For people, horses and dogs	"The Meeting of Air and Water"
Lotta Fountain; Lotta Crabtree Fountain	Massachusetts; The Esplanade, Boston		Katharine Lane Weems	John W. Ames, architect Edwin Dodge, architect	1939		For people, cats and dogs	The fountain was a bequest from actress Lotta Crabtree.
Charles Taft Fountain	Massachusetts; Cleveland Circle, Brookline			Coolidge & Carleson, architects	1912		For people, horses and dogs	
Holyoke City Hall Fountain; Woman's Christian Temperance Union Fountain	Massachusetts; Holyoke City Hall; Holyoke				1901	Monson granite	For people	Constructed in October 1901, dedicated November 9, 1901; contains biblical passages and one from Shakespeare's Othello
Kilbon Memorial Fountain	Massachusetts; Town Park, Lee		Daniel Chester French		1899		For people and horses	Water flows from the mouth of a mask of Konkapot, a Mohican chief.
Belcher Memorial Fountain	Massachusetts; Northfield Town Hall, 70 Main Street, Northfield		Joseph Walker	Aberdeen Granite Works	1909 relocated 1960	Quincy granite Gaslight: cast iron	For people, horses and dogs	
Burnside Fountain	Massachusetts; Worcester Common, Worcester		Charles Y. Harvey (completed by Sherry Fry)	Henry Bacon, architect	1912	Granite basin, bronze sculpture	For horses and dogs	Harvey's Pan-like figure is nicknamed "Turtle Boy."
Bagley Memorial Fountain	Michigan; Detroit			Henry Hobson Richardson, architect	1887		For people	Water flows from the lions' mouths. Added to the National Register of Historic Places in 1971.
Merrill Humane Fountain	Michigan; Palmer Park, Detroit			Carrere & Hastings, architects	1901 relocated 1925		For people, horses and dogs	Merrill Humane Fountain in its original location, c. 1906
Miller Memorial Fountain	Mississippi; Commerce & Main Streets, Natchez				1911		For people, horses and dogs	
American Legion Memorial; World War I Memorial	Missouri; Swope Park, Kansas City		Merrell Gage	G. B. Franklin, architect Chicago Art Bronze Works, foundry	1921		For people	
Jessie Tennille Maschmeyer Memorial Fountain "Zuni Bird Charmer"	Missouri; Outside Bird House, St. Louis Zoo, St. Louis		Walker Hancock	Roman Bronze Works, foundry	1932		For people.	The granite plinth features a life-sized bronze figure of a Zuni bird charmer at center and bubbler at each end.
Cogswell Fountain; Temperance Fountain (Tompkins Square Park)	New York; Tompkins Square Park, Manhattan, New York City		Bertel Thorvaldsen (copy after)	Henry D. Cogswell; J. L. Mott Ironworks	1888		For people	Copy of Thorvaldsen's Hebe:
James Fountain; Union Square Drinking Fountain	New York; Union Square Park, Manhattan, New York City		Karl Adolph Donndorf	J. Leonard Corning, architect	1881		For people and dogs	Donated by Daniel Willis James and Theodore Roosevelt Sr.
Women's Health Protective Association Fountain	New York; Riverside Park at 116th Street, Manhattan, New York City		Bruno Zimm		1909	white marble	For people	Commemorates the 25th anniversary of the association's founding.
Probasco Fountain	Ohio; Clifton Avenue, Cincinnati			Samuel Hannaford, architect	1887		For people, horses and dogs	Added to the National Register of Historic Places in 1980.
Woodland Cemetery Drinking Fountain	Ohio; Woodland Cemetery and Arboretum, Dayton		Karl Bitter		1908-09		For people	Added to the National Register of Historic Places in 1978.
Benson Bubbler	Oregon; Portland			A. E. Doyle, architect	1912		For people	Philanthropist Simon Benson initially installed 20 four-bowl drinking fountains. Portland now features 52 four-bowl Benson Bubblers and 74 single-bowl ones.
David Campbell Monument; Portland Fireman's Memorial	Oregon; 1800 West Burnside Street, Portland		Avard Fairbanks	Paul Cret, architect	1928		For people, horses and dogs	An exedra (curved bench) with a drinking fountain at center. It empties into a basin on the opposite side for horses and dogs.
Charles B. Merrick Memorial Drinking Fountain	Oregon; NE Sandy Street, Portland				1916		For people	
Fountain for Company H Second Oregon Company Volunteers Fountain (Spanish–American War)	Oregon; Lownsdale Square, Portland		John H. Beaver		1914	limestone & bronze	For people	Located near the Spanish–American War Soldier's Monument
Pioneer Woman (Joy); Laberee Memorial Fountain	Oregon; Council Crest Park, Portland		Frederic Littman		1956	Sculpture: bronze Base: granite	For people	
Portland Central Library Fountain	Oregon; 801 SW 10th Avenue, Portland			A. E. Doyle, architect	1913	Wilkinson sandstone	For people	Fountain is right of center:
Shemanski Fountain	Oregon; South Park Blocks, Portland		Oliver Laurence Barrett	Carl L. Linde, architect	1925-26; 1928		For people and dogs	Barrett's figure of "Rebecca at the Well" was added in 1928.
Skidmore Fountain	Oregon; SW First & Ankeny Streets, Portland		Olin Levi Warner	J. M. Wells, architect	1888	Top basin & caryatids: bronze Lower basin & horse troughs: granite	For people, horses and dogs	The octagonal basin spills into 4 water troughs for horses and dogs.
Thompson Fountain	Oregon; Plaza Blocks, 4th Avenue & Main Street, Portland		Roland Hinton Perry	H. G. Wright, architect	1900	Sculpture: bronze Basin & water troughs: Barre granite	For people, horses and dogs	
Hebe Fountain; Woman's Christian Temperance Union Fountain	Oregon; Eagles Park, Lane & Jackson Streets, Roseburg		Bertel Thorvaldsen (copy after)	J. L. Mott Ironworks	1908; 2002 (replica)	cast iron	For people, horses and dogs	The original Hebe fountain was damaged in a 1912 accident and removed. The replica fountain, cast from the same molds, was erected in 2002.
Class of 1892 Fountain "The Scholar and the Football Player"	Pennsylvania; Quadrangle Dormitories, University of Pennsylvania, Philadelphia		Alexander Stirling Calder	Bureau Brothers, foundry	1900		For people	
Annie L. Lowry Memorial Fountain	Pennsylvania; Bainbridge Street median strip at 3rd Street; Philadelphia				1910		For horses and dogs	"Drink Gentle Friends"; Erected by the Women's Pennsylvania Society for the Prevention of Cruelty to Animals
Mary Rebecca Darby Smith Memorial Fountain; Rebecca at the Well	Pennsylvania; Horticultural Drive, West Fairmount Park; Philadelphia		John J. Boyle		1908 relocated 1934		For people Originally, for people, horses and dogs	"Drink, and I will give thy Camels Drink also." Originally installed on the Spring Garden Street median strip at 12th Street. Relocated to West Fairmount Park, 1934.
Temperance Fountain (Philadelphia)	Pennsylvania; Philadelphia				1876; Relocated 1877; Removed to storage 1969		For people	Under a 13-sided gazebo at the 1876 Centennial Exposition. Erected by the Grand Division of the Sons of Temperance. Cost: $2,300; Installed outside Independence Hall, 1877-1969
J. William White Memorial Drinking Fountain	Pennsylvania; Rittenhouse Square, Philadelphia		R. Tait McKenzie		1921		For people	Portrait medallion of J. William White (1919).
Fireman's Drinking Fountain	Pennsylvania; Main Street, Slatington		Caspar Buberl	J. W. Fiske & Company	1909	Sculpture: zinc Base: cast iron	For people and dogs	Added to the National Register of Historic Places in 1981.
Sterne Fountain; Hebe, Goddess of Youth	Texas; Lafayette & Market Streets, Jefferson		Giuseppe Moretti	J. L. Mott, foundry	1913	Sculpture: bronze Base: cast iron	For people, horses and dogs	
Pin Oak Fountain	West Virginia; WV Rte. 29 & Falconwood Road, Pin Oak			Roy Keister, head mason	1932	crystal quartz	For people and horses	2 basins and a horse trough, fed by gravity from a spring uphill of the fountain
R. D. Whitehead Monument	Wisconsin; 16th & Pearl Streets, Milwaukee		Sigvald Asbjornsen		1910	Sculpture: bronze Pier & basin: granite	For horses and dogs	The bas-relief panel depicts Whitehead's horse "George" and dog "Dandy." The watering trough is now used as a planter.

NOTE: some entries in this table overlap the entries in Drinking fountains in Philadelphia. Neither table is an exhaustive list.

== See also ==
- Drinking fountains in Philadelphia
- History of fountains in the United States
