= Probasco =

Probasco may refer to:

== People ==
- Frank Probasco Bohn (1866–1944), politician from the U.S. state of Michigan
- Gaylord Probasco Harnwell CBE (1903–1982), American educator, physicist, president of the University of Pennsylvania
- Henry Probasco (1820–1902), American businessman
- Scotty Probasco (1928–2015), American businessman and philanthropist

== Locations ==
- Henry Probasco House, historic house in Ohio, USA
- Probasco Fountain, historic fountain in Ohio, USA
- Probasco-Dittner Farmstead, historic farm in New Jersey, USA

== See also ==
- Basco (disambiguation)
