= Woman's Christian Temperance Union Fountain (Shenandoah, Iowa) =

Fountain in Iowa, U.S.

- Woman's Christian Temperance Union Public Fountain
- U.S. National Register of Historic Places
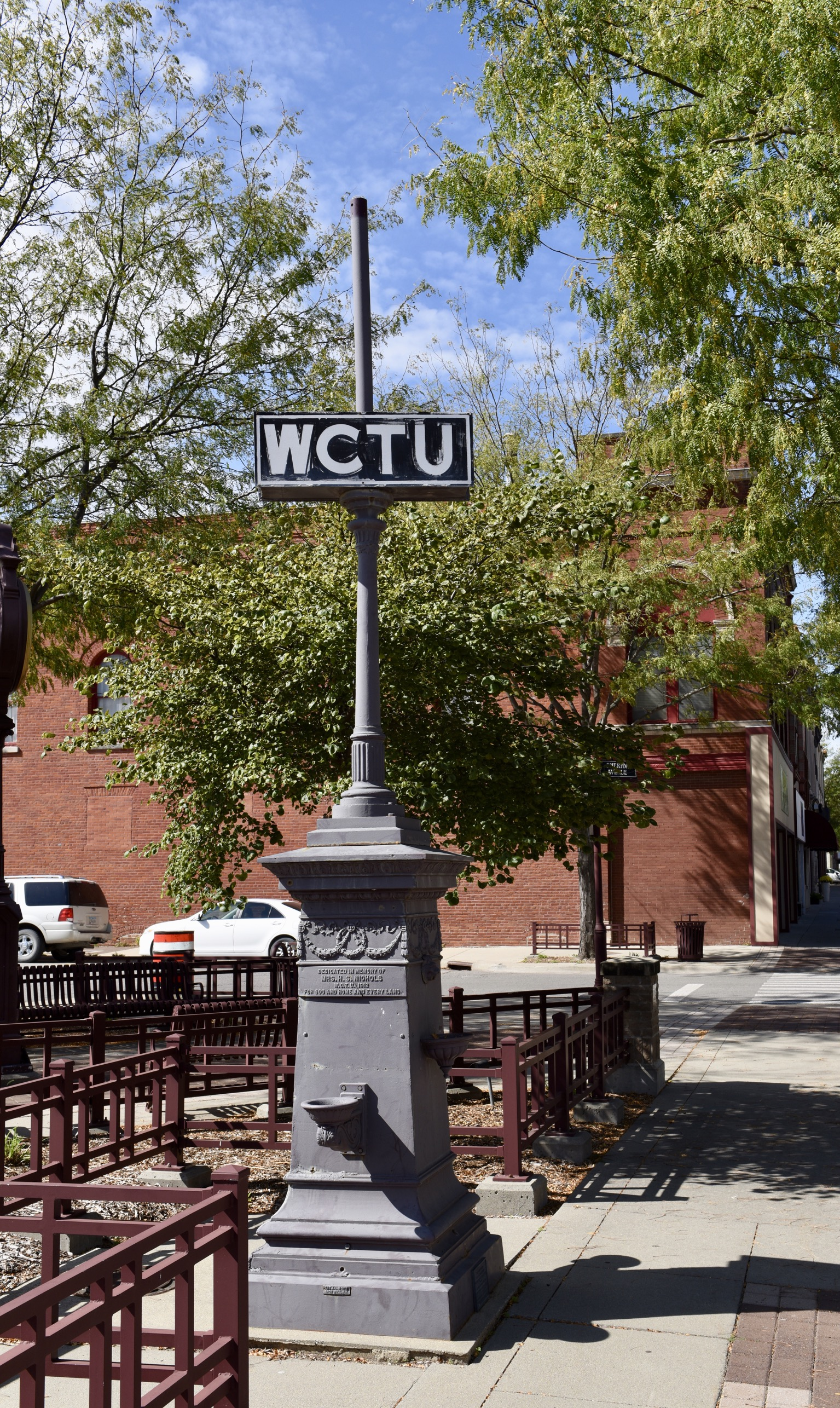

- Location within Iowa Location within the United States
- Location: Clarinda and Sheridan Sts. Shenandoah, Iowa
- Coordinates: 40°45′57″N 95°22′19″W
- Area: less than one acre
- Built: 1912
- NRHP reference No.: 84001293
- Added to NRHP: September 27, 1984

Woman's Christian Temperance Union Public Fountain (W.C.T.U. Fountain) is a historic temperance fountain at Clarinda and Sheridan Streets in Shenandoah, Iowa, United States.

It was built in 1912 by the Woman's Christian Temperance Union to provide water as an alternative to alcohol consumption. The fountain honored Mrs. Lavina Nichols, the local founder of the Shenandoah WCTU chapter. It cost $500 to install ($16,700 in current value.), and features a 4 by 4 feet (1.2 by 1.2 m) base and pedestal that is 7 feet (2.1 m) tall. The sign and column were added ten years later. The fountain was added to the National Register of Historic Places in 1984.

== See also ==
- Woman's Christian Temperance Union Fountain (Rehoboth Beach, Delaware)
- Drinking fountains in the United States
