= Southeast Water Trough =

- U.S. National Register of Historic Places
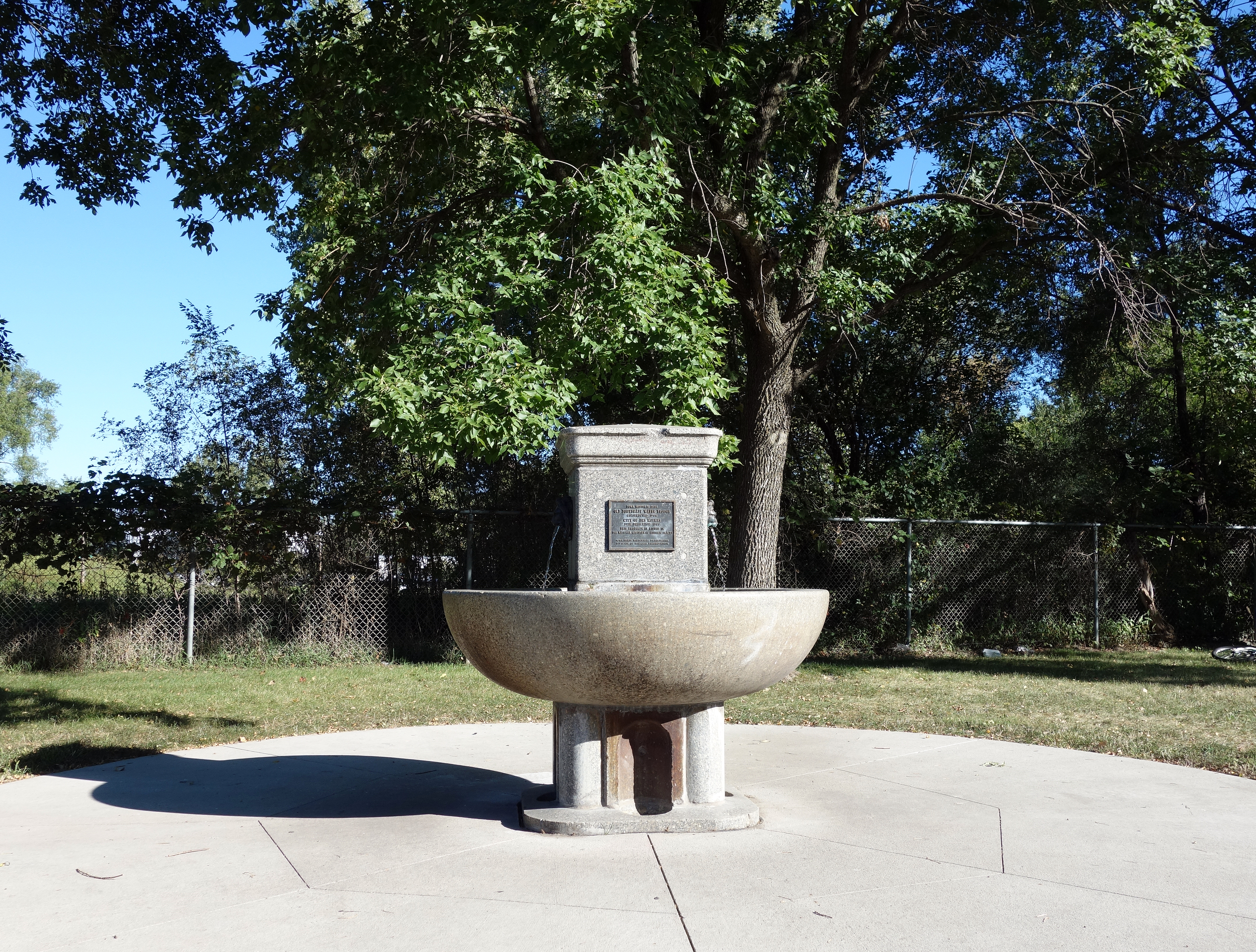

- Location within Iowa Location within the United States
- Location: SE 11th St. and Scott Ave., Des Moines, Iowa
- Coordinates: 41°34′58.4″N 93°36′03.5″W
- Area: less than one acre
- Built: 1906
- NRHP reference No.: 76000801
- Added to NRHP: October 8, 1976

The Southeast Water Trough is a historic structure located in Des Moines, Iowa, United States. It is one of the last of 15 National Humane Alliance fountains that were placed around the city by the Iowa Humane Alliance. They were also named Ensign fountains after the founder of the National Humane Alliance, Hermon Lee Ensign. This was one of two placed in Des Moines in 1906.

The 6-foot (1.8 m) tall granite structure features a rectangular shaft that is surrounded by a 6-foot (1.8 m) bowl. Four small cups are located at the base to provide water for smaller animals. The fountain rests on a base of tiles. It is a reminder of the horse and buggy era before the prevalence of indoor plumbing. While it served a practical function of watering horses, it also served a social function as a place where people in the local community could gather.

The structure was listed on the National Register of Historic Places in 1976.
