= Farewell to Orpheus =

Sculpture in Portland, Oregon

- The sculpture and fountain in 2015
- Artist: Frederic Littman
- Year: 1968–1973
- Type: Sculpture; fountain
- Medium: Bronze
- Subject: Eurydice
- Location: Portland, Oregon, United States; 45.5124°N 122.6848°W
- Owner: Portland State University

Farewell to Orpheus is an outdoor 1968–1973 bronze sculpture and fountain by Frederic Littman, installed at the Portland State University campus in Portland, Oregon, United States.

== Description and history ==
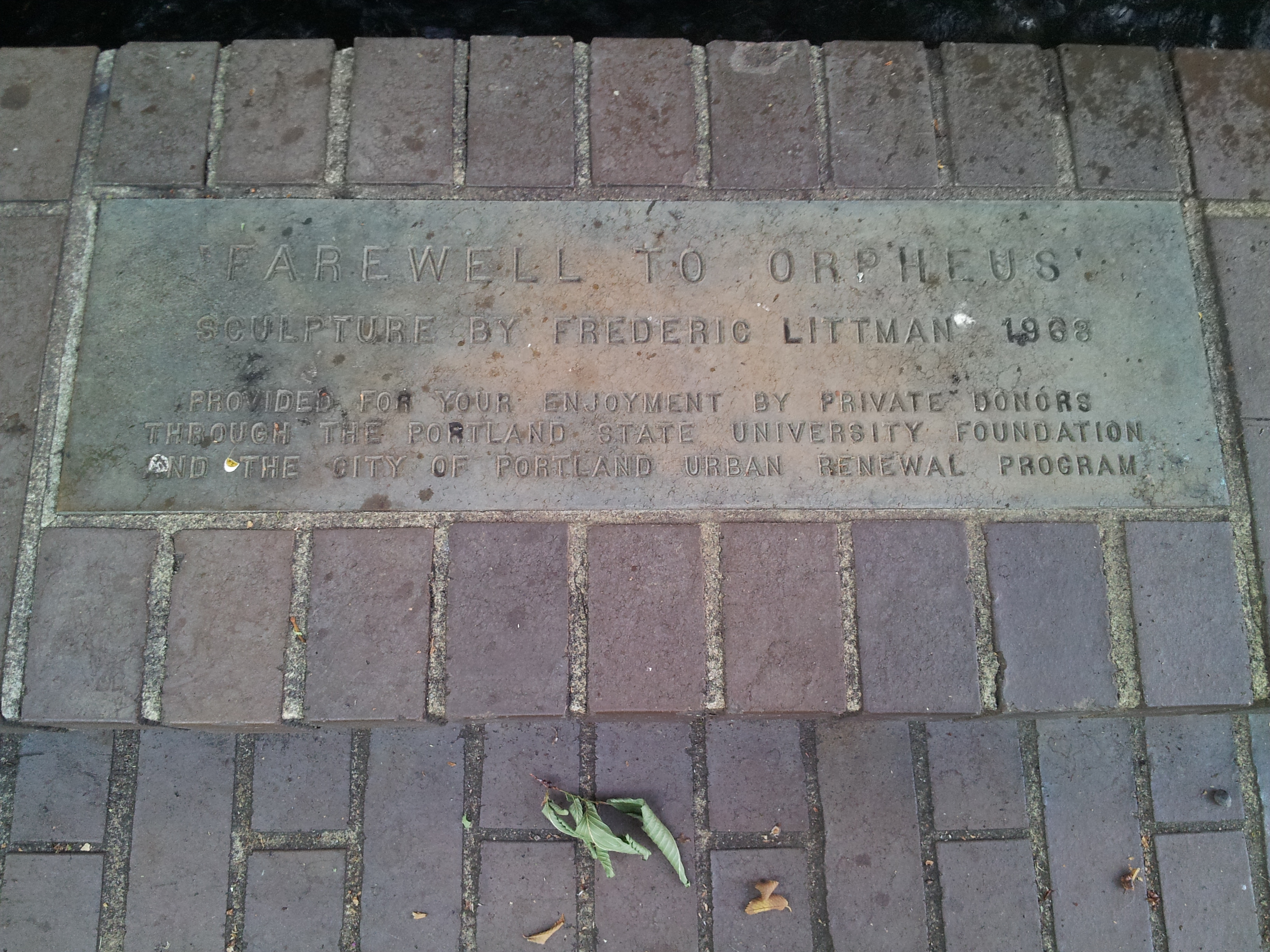
Plaque for the sculpture

Farewell to Orpheus, created by former Portland State University (PSU) art professor Frederic Littman in 1968, is located at Southwest Montgomery Street in the South Park Blocks. It depicts Eurydice and was installed in 1972–1973 as part of the South Park Blocks Urban Renewal Development Project. The fountain is one of four maintained by PSU, along with Walk of Heroines at Hoffman Hall, another in front of the Student Health and Counseling Building, and one at Urban Plaza.

The sculpture has always been surrounded by water but the fountain, which continually recycles 227 gallons of water, was not added until the 1990s. In 2009, PSU partnered with the City of Portland and the sculpture's owners to repair the fountain, which had not worked for nearly a decade. Repairs cost $6,000 and were funded in part by rentals on the South Park Blocks. Work included installation of new fountain heads, lights, and wiring, and re-sealing underwater surfaces. The repairs were completed by three PSU employees. Farewell to Orpheus has been described as a "seating refuge" for students and included in published walking tours of the city.

== See also ==
- 1968 in art
- 1973 in art
- Fountains in Portland, Oregon
- Greek mythology in western art and literature
- Orpheus and Eurydice
