= Pioneer Woman (Littman) =

Sculpture in Portland, Oregon

- The sculpture in 2016
- Artist: Frederic Littman
- Year: 1956
- Type: Sculpture
- Medium: Bronze
- Dimensions: 3.0 m × 0.91 m × 0.91 m (10 ft × 3 ft × 3 ft)
- Condition: "Treatment needed" (1993)
- Location: Portland, Oregon, United States; 45°29′54″N 122°42′29″W
- Owner: City of Portland's Bureau of Parks and Recreation

Pioneer Woman, also known as Joy, Joy (Pioneer Woman), the Laberee Memorial Fountain, Mother/Child and Young Pioneer Woman, is an outdoor 1956 bronze sculpture and drinking fountain by American artist Frederic Littman, located at Council Crest Park in Portland, Oregon.

== Description and history ==
Located at Council Crest Park on Southwest Fairmont Boulevard, Pioneer Woman is a bronze sculpture and drinking fountain designed by Frederic Littman and completed in 1956. It depicts a standing female figure with her hair flying behind her, holding a baby in her outstretched arms. The sculpture measures approximately 10 feet (3.0 m) x 3 feet (0.91 m) x 3 feet (0.91 m) and rests on a triangular granite base which measures approximately 20 inches (51 cm) x 36 inches (91 cm) x 36 inches (91 cm). The base sits in the center of a hexagonal foundation made of concrete and gravel. An inscription on the base reads "Littman"; another, around the sides of the base, reads: This Fountain a Gift / Of Florence and / George P. Laberee".

The work was donated to the City of Portland by Florence and George P. Laberee. Its condition was deemed "treatment needed" by the Smithsonian Institution's "Save Outdoor Sculpture!" program in November 1993. According to Smithsonian, Pioneer Woman is administered by the City of Portland's Bureau of Parks and Recreation.

== See also ==
- 1956 in art
- Drinking fountains in the United States
- The Pioneer Mother (Eugene, Oregon)
