= National Humane Alliance fountains =

Series of granite drinking fountains

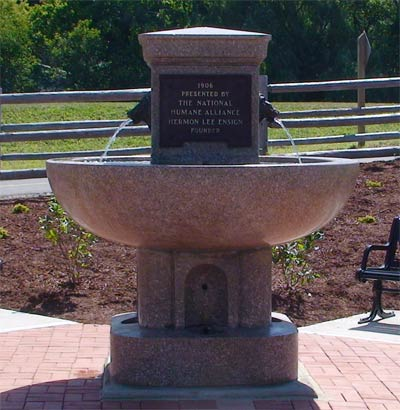
The Derby, Connecticut fountain, which was restored and rededicated in 2007

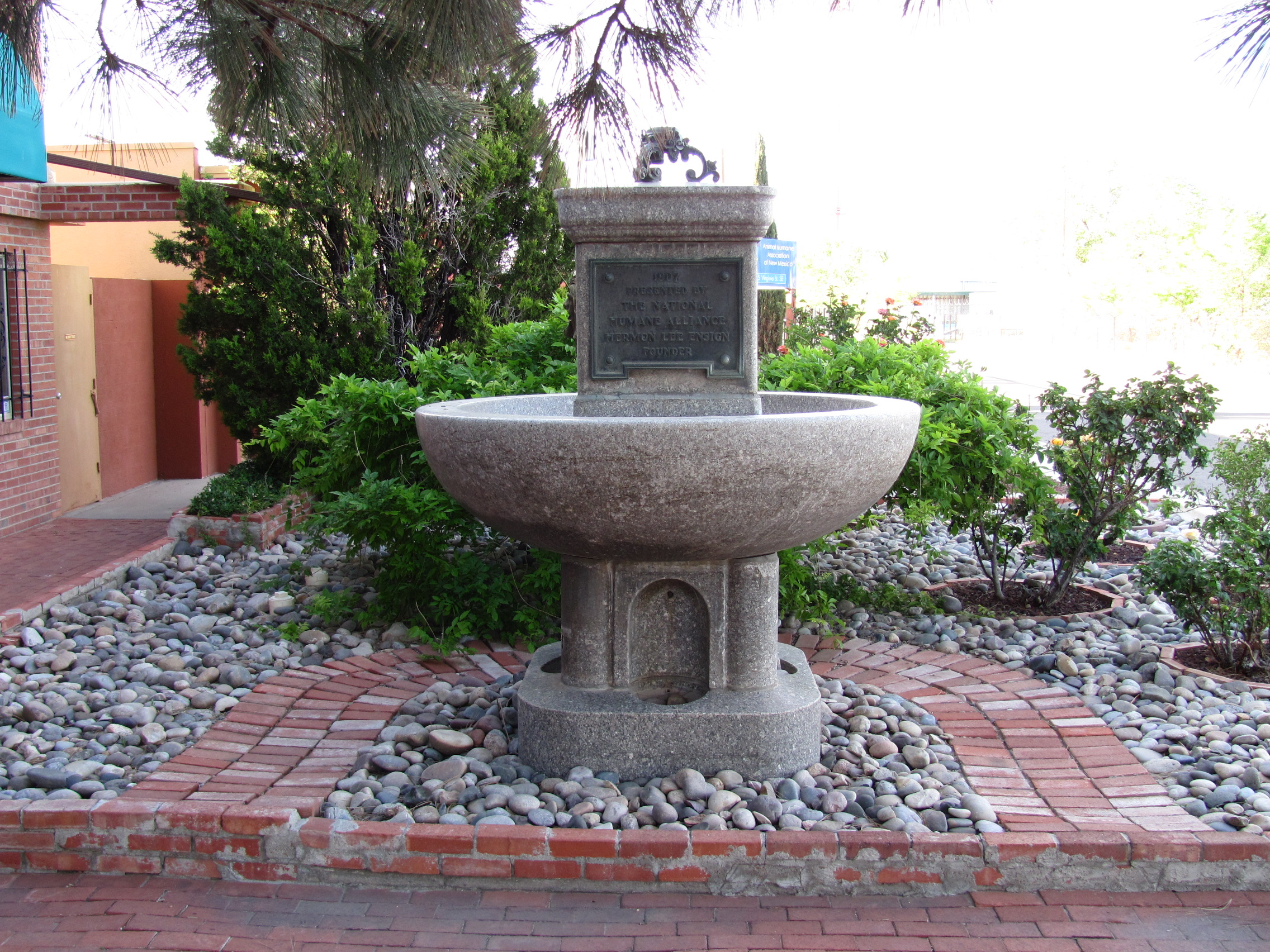
The Albuquerque, New Mexico fountain, listed on the National Register of Historic Places in 1986

The National Humane Alliance fountains are a series of granite drinking fountains distributed by the National Humane Alliance, intended to provide fresh drinking water for horses, dogs, cats, and people. About 125 of the fountains were donated to cities throughout the United States and Mexico between 1902 and 1915. Most of the fountains have been removed from their original sites, usually in the center of busy intersections, but at least 70 of them are still publicly viewable. Two examples are listed on the National Register of Historic Places: one in Des Moines, Iowa (also known as the Southeast Water Trough) and one in Albuquerque, New Mexico.

== History ==
The National Humane Alliance was founded in 1897 by Hermon Lee Ensign, a philanthropist and animal welfare advocate who had amassed a fortune in the advertising business. When he died in 1899, he left much of his wealth to build animal drinking fountains for any city that requested one. The fountains were provided free of charge as long as the city provided an appropriate site, water supply, and maintenance. Between 1904 and 1912, more than 100 cities took advantage of the offer. The fountains were produced in Vinalhaven, Maine by the Bodwell Granite Company, the same company that supplied the stone blocks for the Brooklyn Bridge.

The fountains' original use became obsolete not long after they were installed as motor vehicles replaced horses in urban areas. Mostly located in busy intersections, the fountains became traffic hazards and many of them were removed to parks or other quieter locations. Nevertheless, around 70 of the fountains are still publicly viewable, including several examples that have been restored and are still functional.

== Design ==
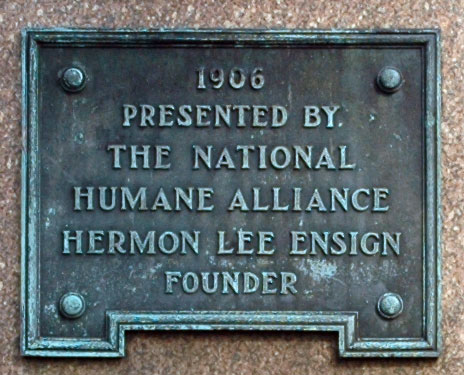
An example of the plaque which appears on each fountain

The fountains are not all identical, but most share one of two basic designs. The most common version is 6 feet 8 inches (2.03 m) tall, consisting of a large circular bowl with a square pillar rising from its center placed on a square pedestal. The main bowl, intended for horses, is 6 feet (1.8 m) in diameter and is fed by bronze spigots in the shape of lion heads on three sides of the upper pillar. The fourth side contains a bronze plaque listing details of the fountain's construction. The lower pedestal is 18 inches (46 cm) high and has niches on each side with drinking bowls near ground level for dogs, cats, and other small animals. The fountain is assembled from five pieces of granite weighing 10,000 pounds (4,500 kg) in total.

The second fountain design has a smaller bowl and a round, rather than square, pedestal. These were intended for smaller cities and other locations where the bigger fountain, which could accommodate eight horses at a time, was considered unnecessarily large. Some of the fountains originally had decorative light standards mounted on top; however, few of these have survived.

== Locations ==
More than 100 cities across the United States received the fountains, and at least 70 are still in existence. (A handful were also located in Mexico and Puerto Rico.) Derby, Connecticut has a website dedicated to the fountains that includes an interactive map of the United States with locations and pictures.

== See also ==
- Drinking fountains in the United States
