= Tyler Davidson Fountain =

- U.S. National Register of Historic Places
- Cincinnati Local Historic Landmark
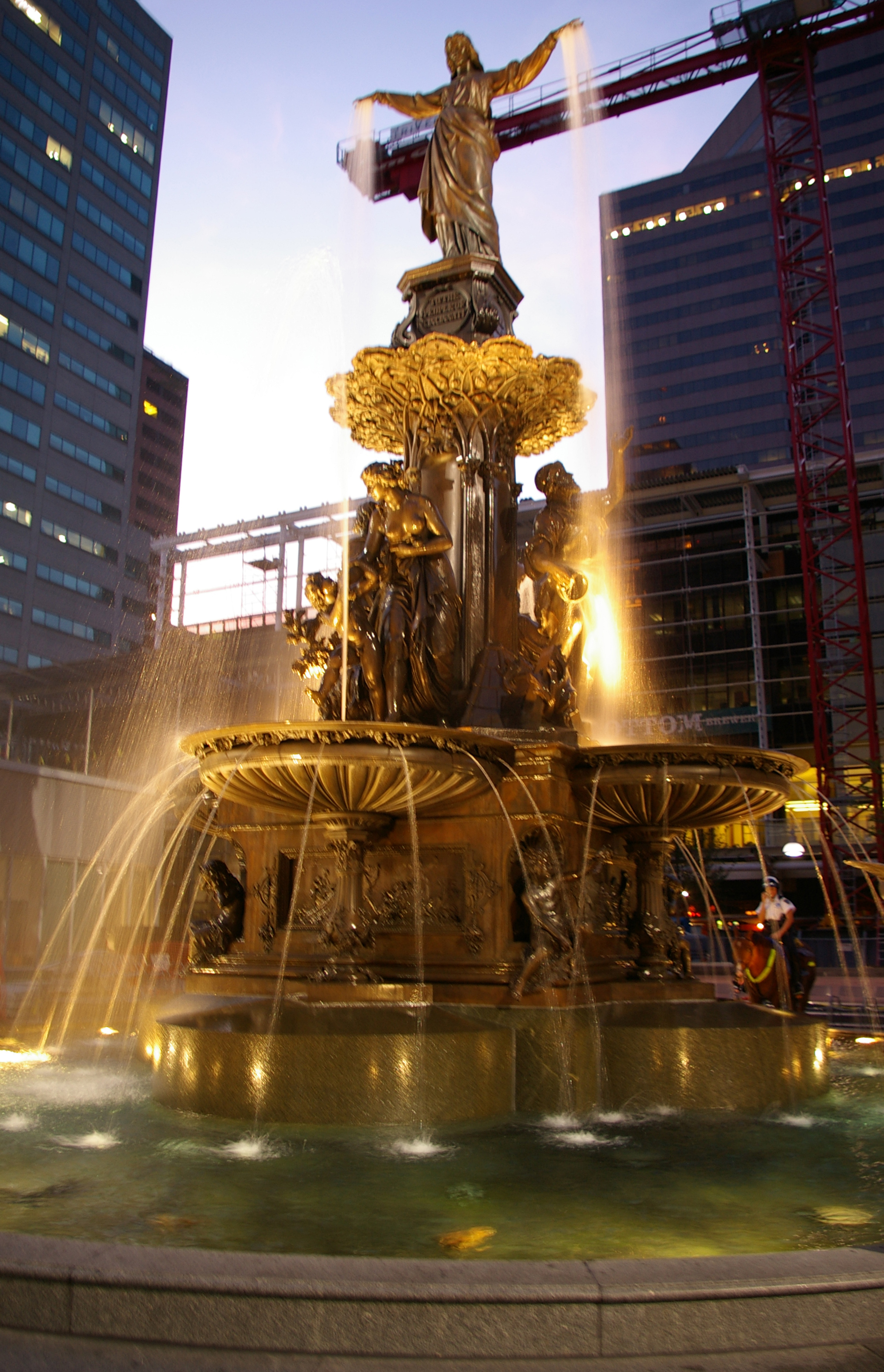
- Nicknames: "The Lady", "The Cincinnati Angel"

- Location within Ohio Location within the United States
- Location: 5th St., Cincinnati, Ohio, United States
- Coordinates: 39°6′5.9″N 84°30′44.8″W
- Area: 1.2 acres (0.49 ha)
- Built: 1871
- Architect: Von Miller, Ferdinand; et al.
- NRHP reference No.: 79001854
- Added to NRHP: October 11, 1979

The Tyler Davidson Fountain or The Genius of Water is a statue and fountain located in Cincinnati, Ohio. It is regarded as the city's symbol and one of the area's most-visited attractions. It was dedicated in 1871 and is the centerpiece of Fountain Square, a hardscape plaza at the corner of 5th and Vine Streets in the downtown area. It is surrounded by stores, hotels, restaurants and offices.

Originally, and for more than 130 years, it was located in the center of 5th Street (Fountain Square's original configuration), immediately west of Walnut Street. In 2006, renovations were undertaken to Fountain Square and the Tyler Davidson Fountain was temporarily removed. When reinstalled it was relocated to a much wider space near the north end of the reconfigured square, closer to the Fifth Third Bank Building and away from street traffic. The fountain is turned off for the winter months and turned on again in time for the first home game of Major League Baseball's Cincinnati Reds.

== Description ==
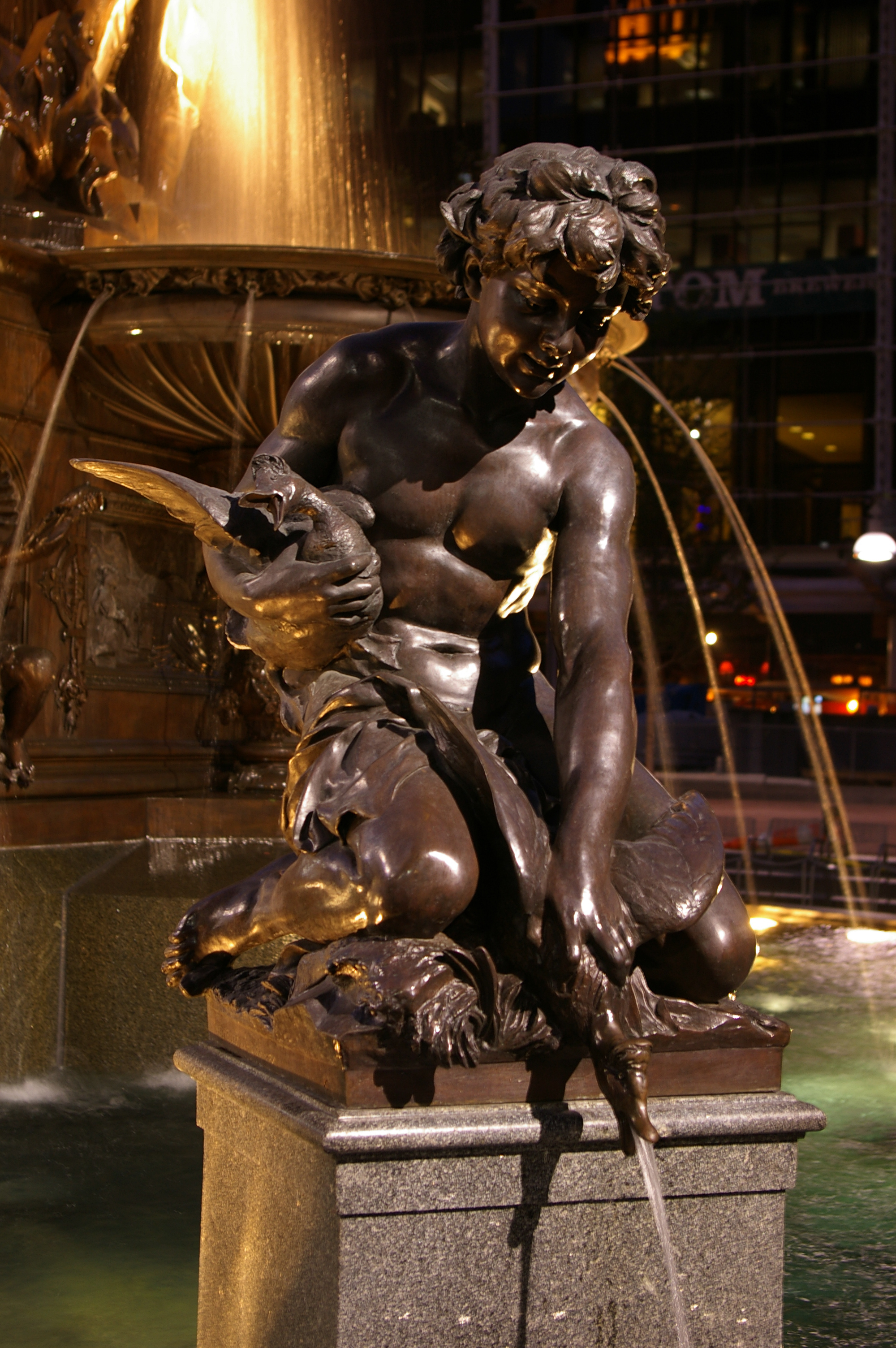
A boy with a goose represents one of the pleasures of water.

The 43-foot-tall (13 m) fountain is cast in bronze and sits on a green granite base. The inscription "To the People of Cincinnati" appears on its base.

The artistic fountain's motif is water, in homage the river city's continuing debt to the Ohio River. The central figure, the Genius of Water—a female in heroic size—pours down the symbolic longed-for rain from hundreds of jets pierced in her outstretched fingers. The figure is 9 feet high and weighs 2 tons.

The pedestal itself is square with four representations in basso-relievo of four principal uses of water; namely, steam, water-power, navigation, and the fisheries. The first is typified by workers in iron using a trip hammer powered by an engine in the background; the second, by peasants carrying corn to a watermill; the third, by a steamboat leaving the shore, lined by numbers waving farewell; the fourth, by groups of fishermen and children.

From the center of the pedestal rises a shaft spread at the top with interlaced vines and foliage and about these are four groups. On the north is a workman standing upon a burning roof and imploring the aid of water; at the south is a farmer standing in the midst of a field where are plainly seen the effects of a drought—he too is praying for rain. Upon these two groups the Genius of Water is dropping a gentle spray. At the west a young girl is offering the water to an old man with crutches. On the east side a mother partially nude is leading her naked and reluctant boy to the bath.

Four outer figures with animals represent the pleasures of water. These are working drinking fountains from which passersby can drink. On the drinking fountains are figures of nude boys—one riding a dolphin, another playing with ducks, a third struggling with a snake and the fourth on the back of a turtle.

The construct is made of approximately 24 short tons (22 t) of cannon bronze purchased from the Danish government and 85 short tons (77 t) of granite.

== History ==
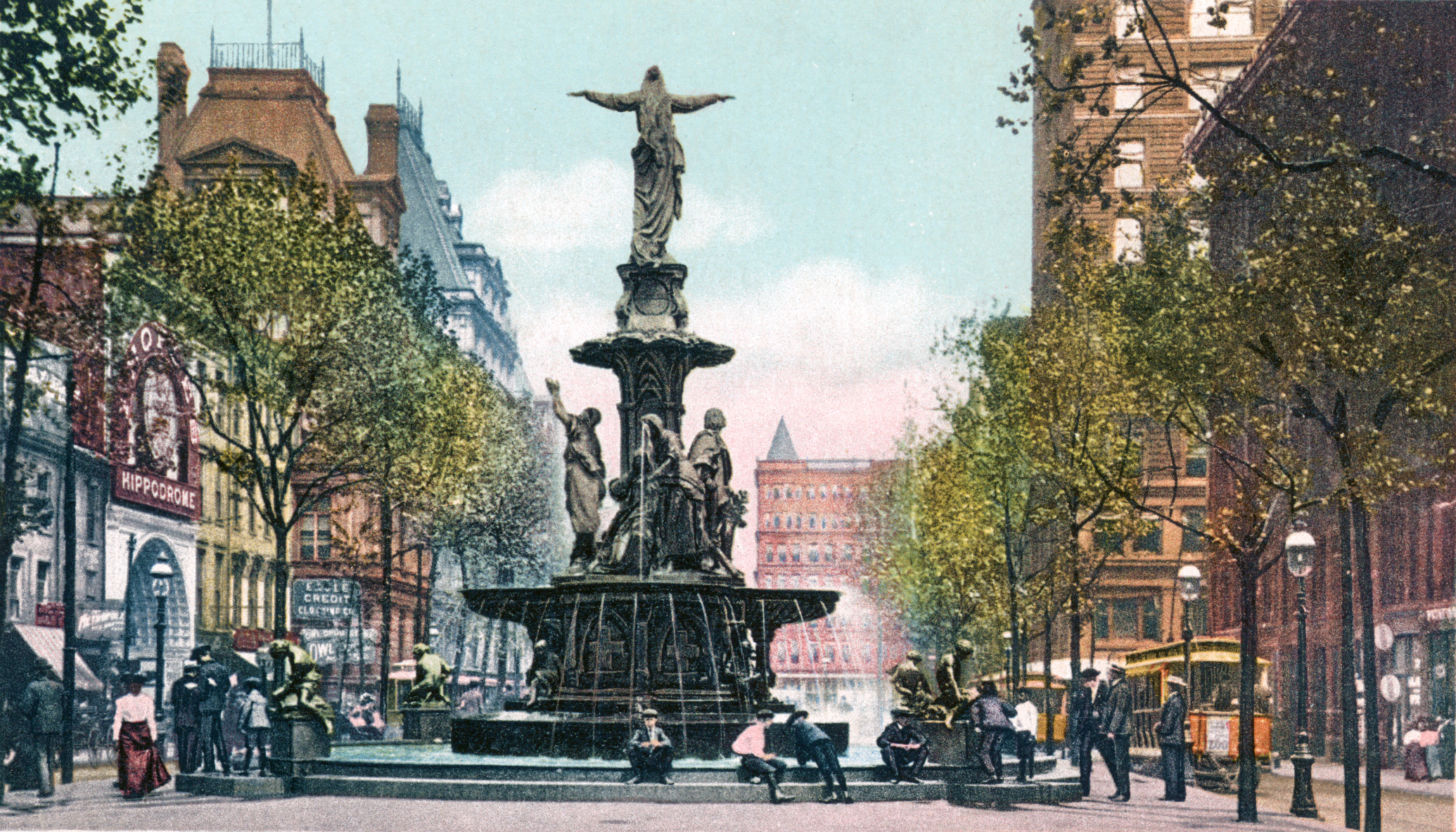
Tyler Davidson Fountain in 1906

After the death of his brother-in-law and business partner Tyler Davidson, Cincinnati businessman Henry Probasco went to Munich, Germany in search of a suitable memorial to him. Many years before, artist August von Kreling had collaborated with Ferdinand von Miller at the Royal Bronze Foundry of Bavaria to design a fountain to rival the great fountains of Europe but which would glorify mankind rather than fanciful creatures and mythic deities. When Miller could find no patron to sponsor the fountain, the designs languished until Probasco came to him with an interest in a similar theme. Probasco requested the addition of four figures with animals that would act as drinking fountains, which Miller's sons Ferdinand and Fritz designed. The original miniature model is now located in the Cincinnati Art Museum.

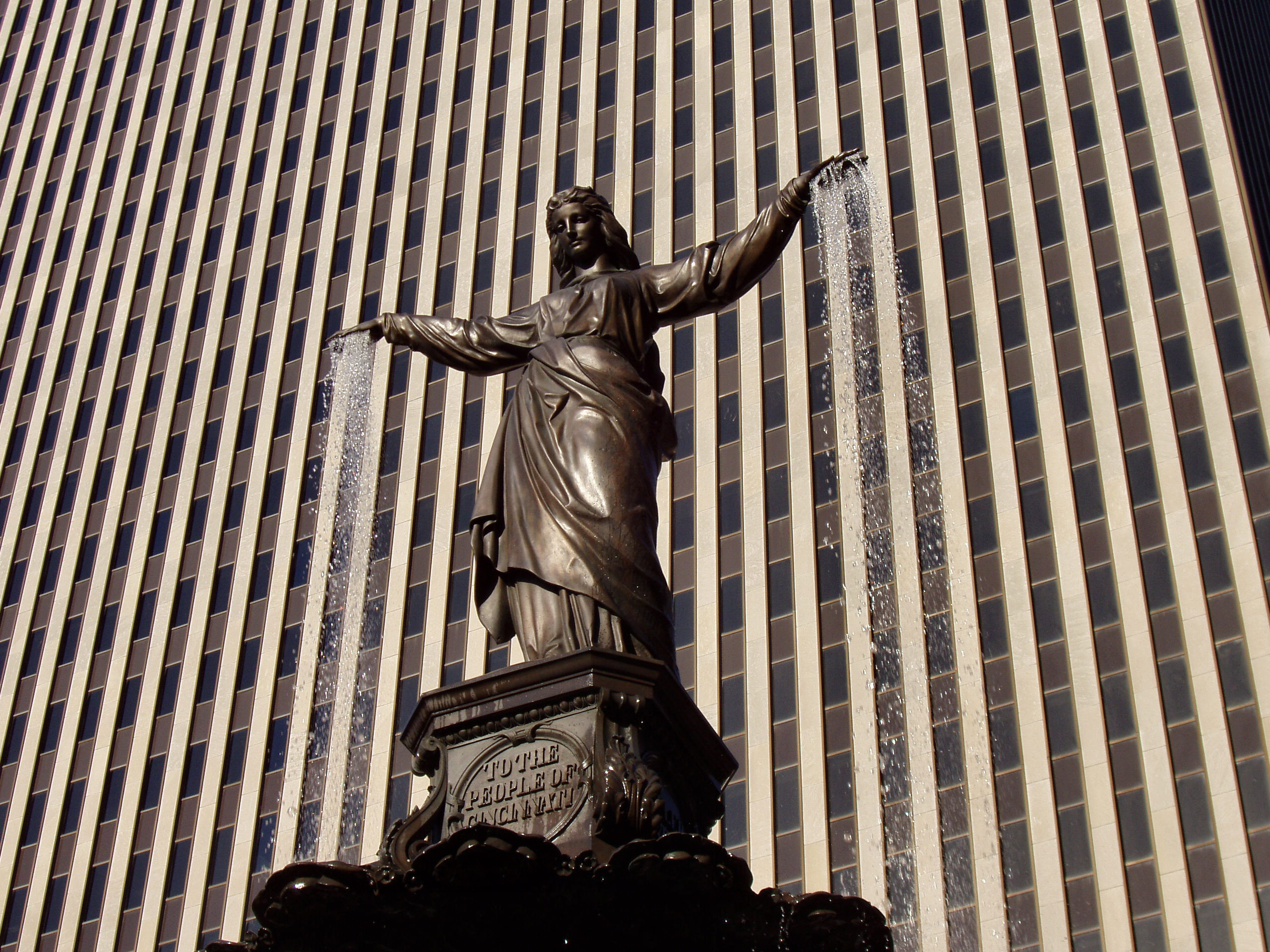
The Genius of Water close-up at its former location

The fountain was cast in separate sections at the foundry and shipped to Cincinnati for assembly. Probasco requested that the City of Cincinnati remove the dilapidated market along 5th Street between Vine and Walnut Streets for the fountain. In its place an esplanade bisecting 5th Street was built, the designer was architect William Tinsley. Tinsley had also designed the Henry Probasco House in the suburb of Clifton. The esplanade made the fountain easily visible to anyone traveling by. Miller traveled to Cincinnati for the dedication ceremony, which took place on October 6, 1871, it is estimated that 20,000 people were present. Miller and Von Kreling enjoyed a degree of celebrity in the city.

The fountain originally faced east, toward Europe, where much of Cincinnati's population originated. When Fountain Square was redone in 1969, the fountain was realigned to face west. With the newest rendition of Fountain Square, the fountain faces to south since it is on the edge of the square.

The fountain was renovated for the first time in 1969 for a celebration of its centennial. The Fountain Square plaza was also redesigned for better traffic flow, and the fountain was moved and turned to face west rather than east. The fountain was turned to face the west because Fifth Street was made into a one way street heading east and drivers would be able to see the front of the statue. Additional repairs and another refurbishing project was undertaken in 1999. In 2005, as part of Fountain Square's revitalization, the city decided to move the entire fountain to the center of Fountain Square. The estimated cost was approximately $42 million. The city was responsible for $4 million. During the renovation the fountain was on display at the Cincinnati Art Museum.

Fountain Square reopened on October 14, 2006, with an elaborate ceremony that included different stages for multiple bands, food, beer and fireworks. The fountain continues to be a backdrop for various cultural events in Cincinnati: movie nights, game shows, and the ice rink which opens in the winter.

The fountain is most familiar to non-Cincinnati residents for being featured in the opening credits (at its former location) of the television series WKRP in Cincinnati. It can also be seen in the montage that accompanies the opening narration for the paranormal investigation series Ghost Adventures.

== See also ==
- List of statues
- National Register of Historic Places listings in downtown Cincinnati, Ohio
- Probasco Fountain
