= Basco =

Basco (from the Latin, vascone, meaning "basque") may refer to:

- Basco, Batanes, a municipality in the Philippines
- Basco, Illinois, a village in the United States
- Basco, Wisconsin, an unincorporated community in the United States
- Briggs & Stratton, a manufacturing company

== People with the name ==
- Alessio Di Basco (born 1964), Italian professional cyclist
- Derek Basco (born 1971), American actor
- Darion Basco (born 1975), American actor
- Dante Basco (born 1976), American actor
- Dion Basco (born 1978), American actor
- Arianna Basco (born 1982), American actress
- Ella Jay Basco, American actress
- Janet Basco, Filipina singer
- Johnny Geo Basco, (born 1974), Canadian wrestling personality
