= Pin Oak, West Virginia =

Unincorporated community in West Virginia, US

Coordinates: 39.4342°N 78.4506°W

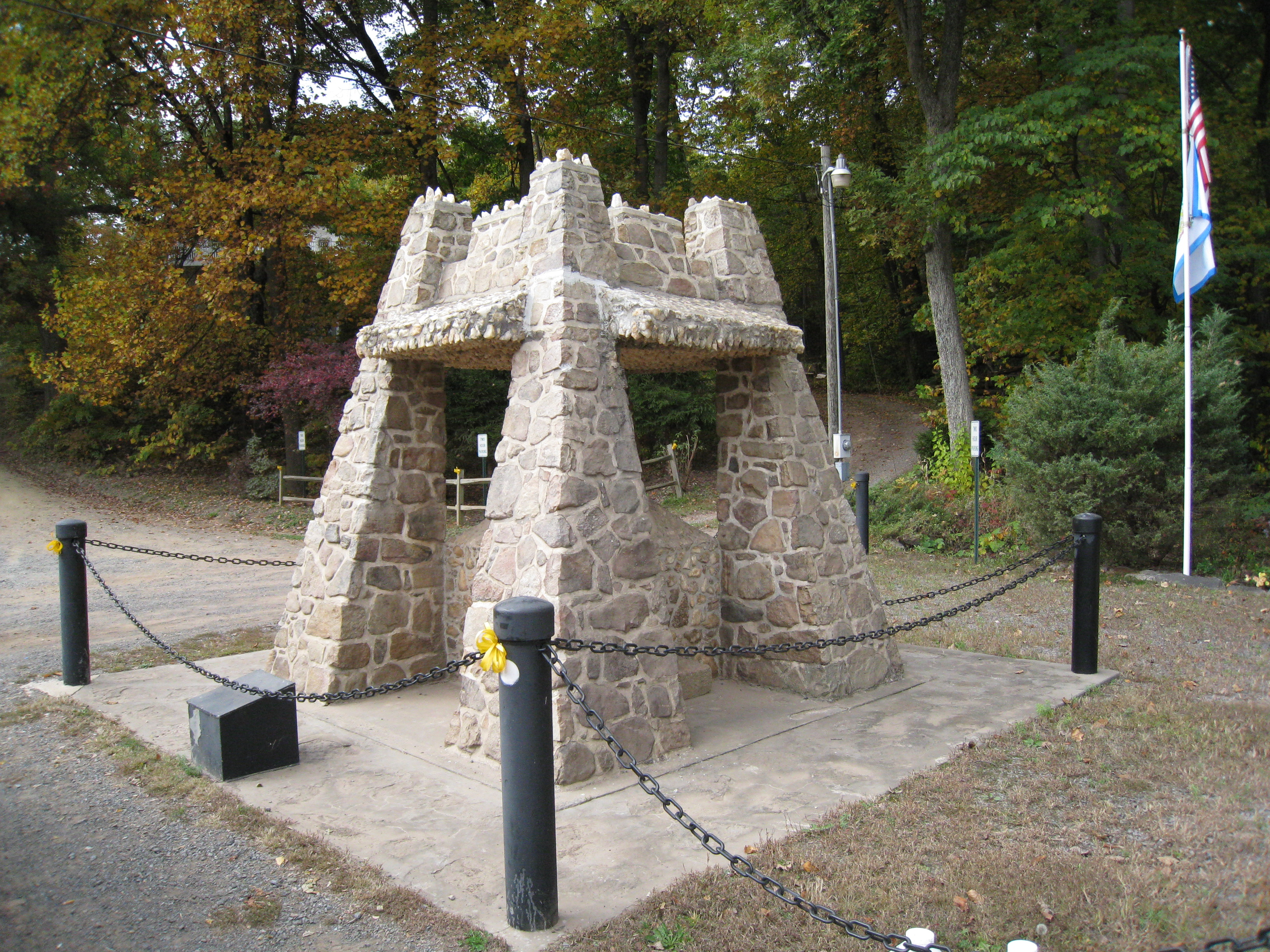
Pin Oak Fountain

Pin Oak is an unincorporated community in Hampshire County in the U.S. state of West Virginia. Pin Oak is located along West Virginia Route 29 between Paw Paw and Forks of Cacapon. Pin Oak is roughly centered at the intersection of Pin Oak Road (West Virginia Secondary Route 29/3) and Cabin Run Road (West Virginia Secondary Route 29/4) with West Virginia Route 29. The old Pinoak School lies north of this intersection.

There is a public fountain built in 1932.

== Historic site ==
- Pin Oak Fountain, WV Route 29
