= Henry Probasco =

American hardware magnate (1820–1902)

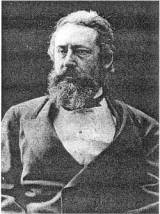
Henry Probasco in 1902

Henry Probasco (4 July 1820 in Newtown, Connecticut – 25 October 1902) was an American hardware magnate noted for the Tyler Davidson Fountain, Probasco Fountain and the Henry Probasco House. He had an interest in art and was selected as a "centennial commissioner" from Ohio.

Probasco made his fortune as a hardware merchant, selling his business in 1866. He then traveled to Europe and commissioned the Royal Bavarian Foundry in Munich to create the 45-foot-high bronze fountain named for his business partner and brother-in-law, Tyler Davidson. He also attended the Universal Exposition of 1867 in Paris where he made an unprecedented bid of 150,000 francs for Meissonier's Friedland.

Probasco's rare book collection was purchased by the Newberry Library. The collection, “some 2,500 volumes purchased for $52,924, included incunabula, Shakespeare folios, Grolier bindings, rare Bibles (among them the King James, first edition), ten early editions of Homer, nine of Dante, and eight of Horace, to mention only a few special works,” was the basis of what would become the library's major rare book collection.
