= Woman's Christian Temperance Union Fountain =

- U.S. National Register of Historic Places
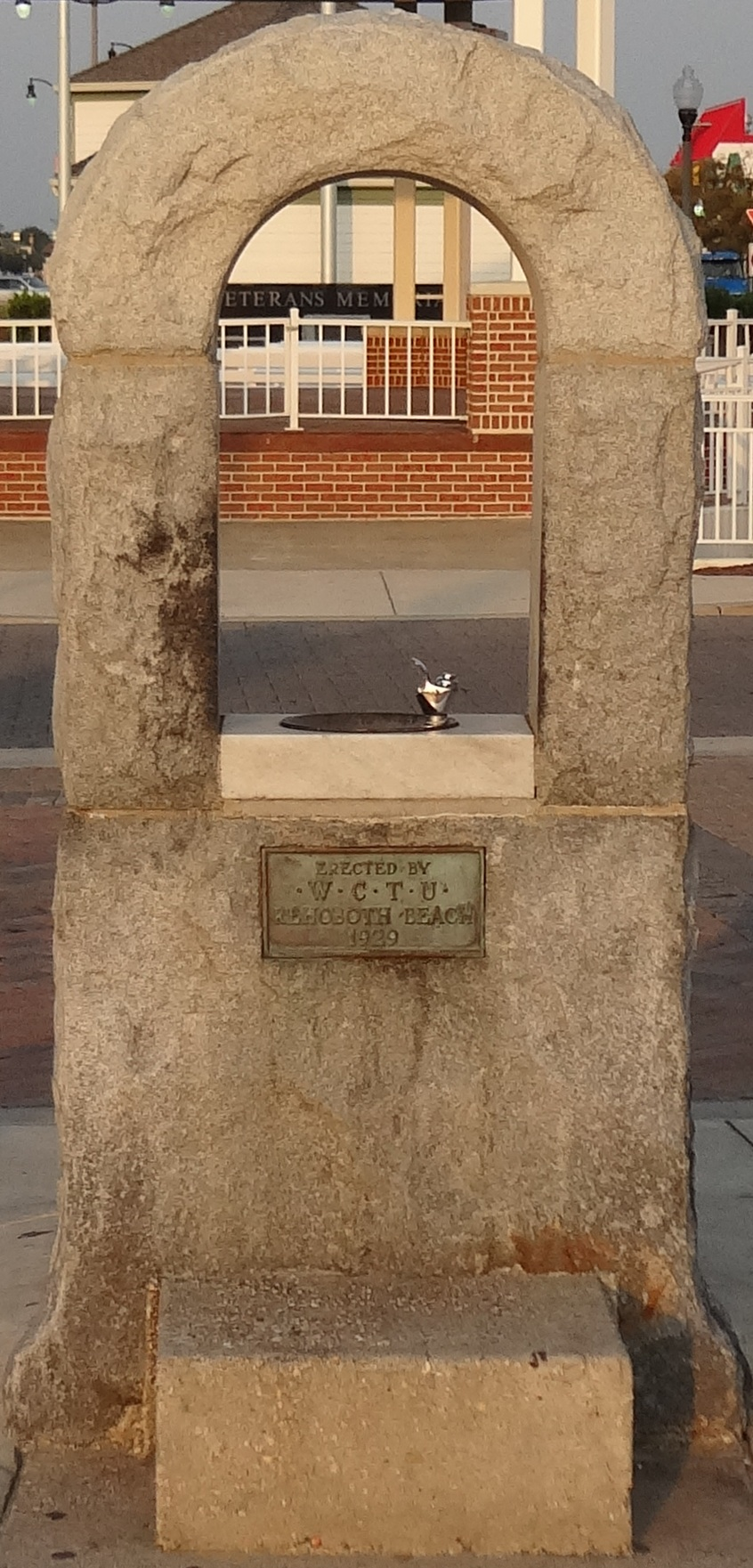
- Woman's Christian Temperance Union Fountain, September 2012

- Location within Delaware Location within the United States
- Location: Boardwalk at Rehoboth Ave., Rehoboth Beach, Delaware
- Coordinates: 38°43′00″N 75°4′34″W
- Area: less than one acre
- Built: 1929
- NRHP reference No.: 09000052
- Added to NRHP: February 28, 2009

Woman's Christian Temperance Union Fountain is a historic temperance fountain located at Rehoboth Beach, Sussex County, Delaware. It was erected by the Woman's Christian Temperance Union in 1929 to commemorate the 50th anniversary of the Delaware branch of the organization. It measures six feet tall, three feet wide, and is constructed of granite.

It was added to the National Register of Historic Places in 1977.

== See also ==
- Drinking fountains in the United States
