= Probasco Fountain =

- U.S. National Register of Historic Places
- U.S. Historic district – Contributing property
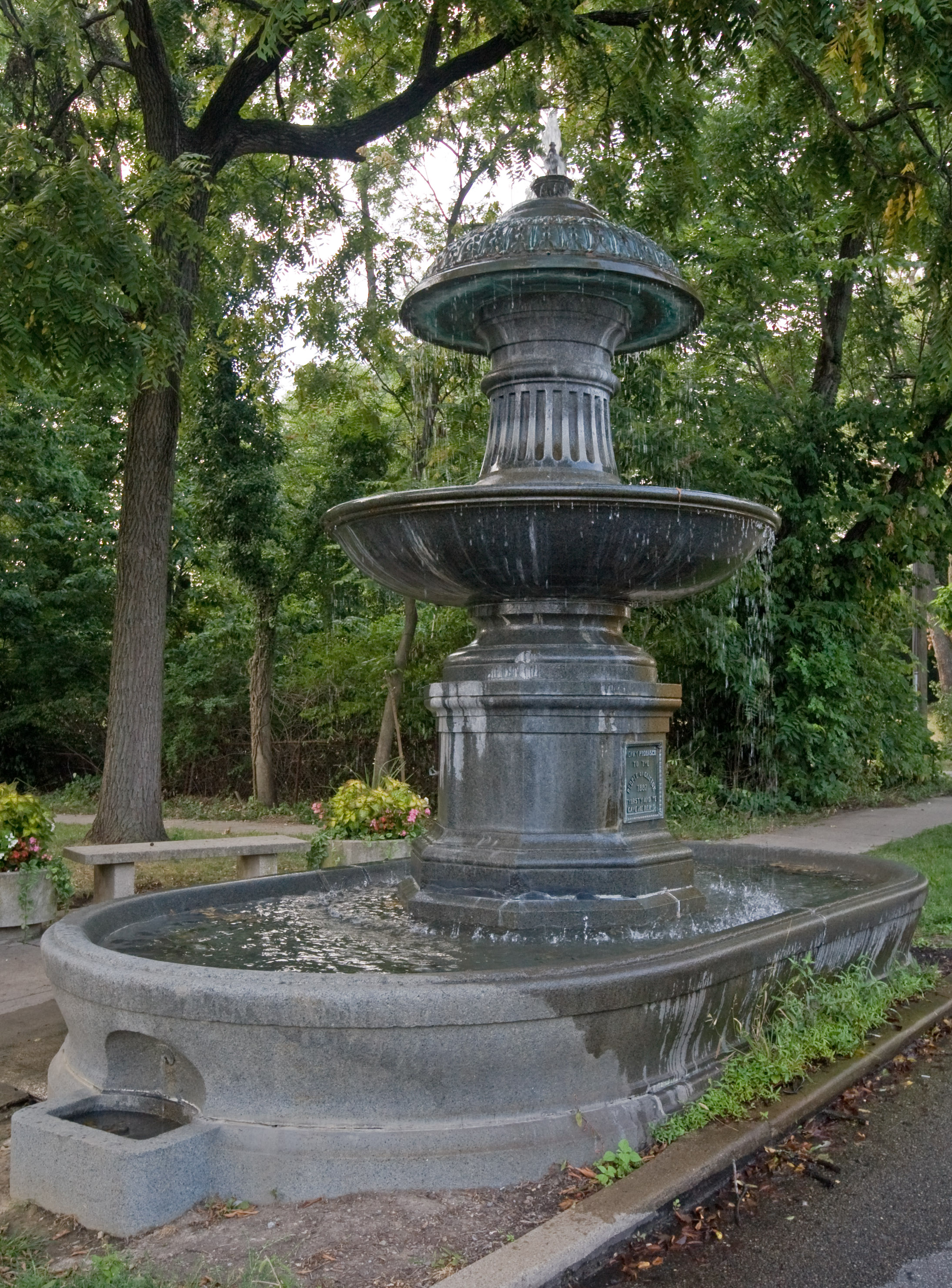
- Southern side of the fountain

- Location within Ohio Location within the United States
- Location: Clifton Ave., Cincinnati, Ohio
- Coordinates: 39°9′2″N 84°31′7″W
- Area: 0 acres (0 ha)
- Built: 1887
- Architect: Samuel Hannaford & Sons
- Part of: Clifton Avenue Historic District (ID78002074)
- MPS: Samuel Hannaford and Sons TR in Hamilton County
- NRHP reference No.: 80003077
- Added to NRHP: March 3, 1980

The Probasco Fountain is a large fountain in Cincinnati, Ohio, United States. Built of bronze on a base of granite, the fountain was constructed in 1887 according to a design by Samuel Hannaford.

The fountain is named for its donor, Henry Probasco, a Cincinnati resident who also gave the city the Tyler Davidson Fountain. Built as a drinking fountain for the residents of the surrounding neighborhood of Clifton, it is composed of four separate drinking basins: one each for humans, horses, dogs, and birds. Measuring 10 feet (3.0 m) high, the fountain is composed of a central column that is crowned with a piece shaped like the cap of a mushroom.

Located along Clifton Avenue near that street's intersection with Woolper Avenue, the Probasco Fountain is a contributing property to the Clifton Avenue Historic District, which is listed on the National Register of Historic Places. In 1980, the fountain itself was added to the Register, along with dozens of other buildings designed by Samuel Hannaford in Cincinnati and other parts of Hamilton County.

== See also ==
- Henry Probasco House
- Drinking fountains in the United States
