= Henry Probasco House =

Historic house in Ohio, United States

- U.S. National Register of Historic Places
- Cincinnati Local Historic Landmark
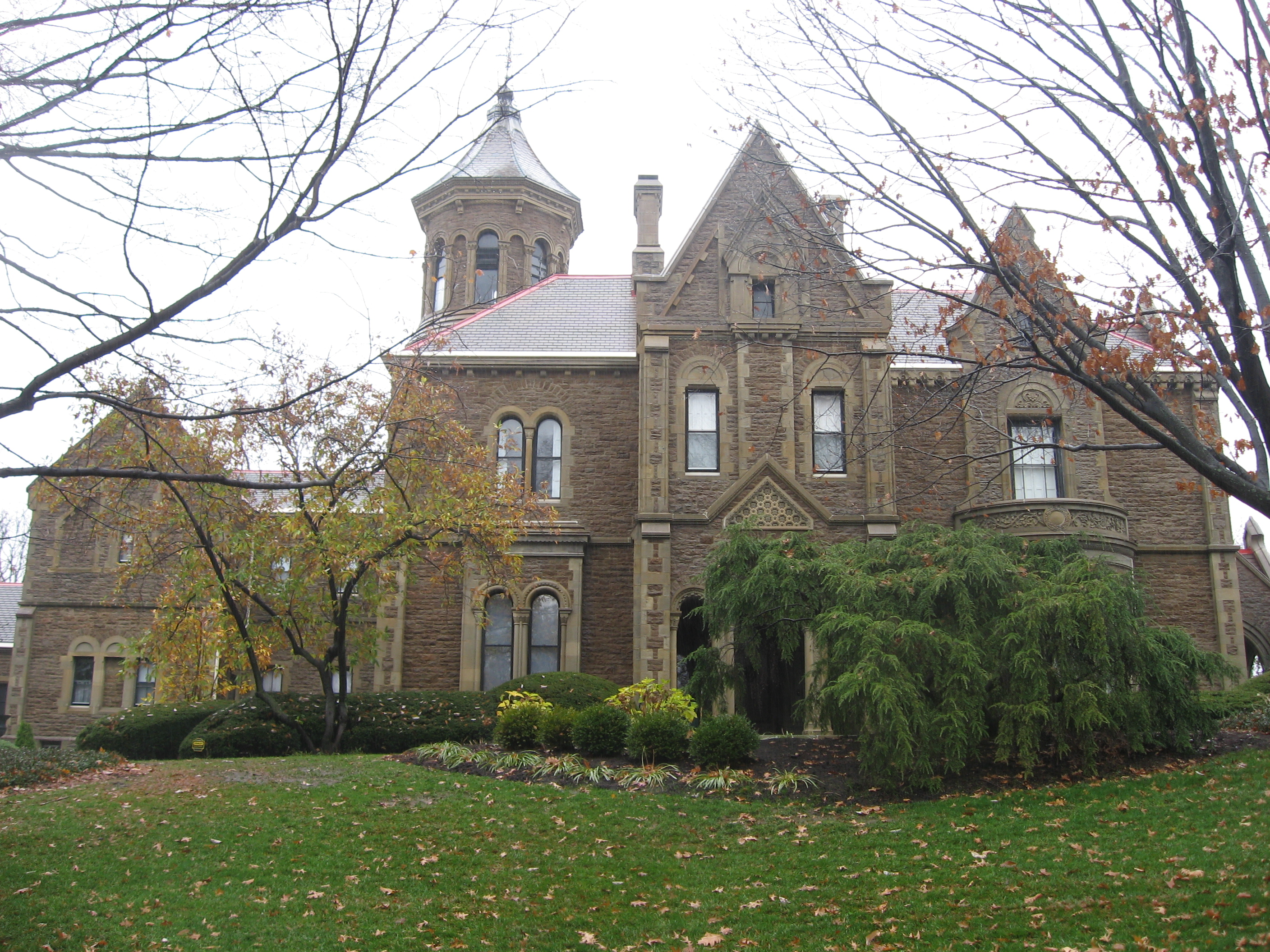
- Front of the house

- Location within Ohio
- Location: 430 W. Cliff Ln., Cincinnati, Ohio
- Coordinates: 39°9′27.24″N 84°31′24.84″W
- Area: 20 acres (8.1 ha)
- Built: 1859–1866
- Architect: William Tinsley
- Architectural style: Romanesque Revival
- NRHP reference No.: 72001022
- Added to NRHP: November 9, 1972

Henry Probasco House is a registered historic, single-dwelling house in the Clifton neighborhood of Cincinnati, Ohio, United States. It was built from 1859 to 1866 for Henry Probasco and his wife, Julia Amanda, on a 20-acre (8.1 ha) estate. Probasco is known for donating the Tyler Davidson Fountain to the city. The house was listed in the National Register on November 9, 1972.

In 1856 Henry Probasco toured Europe and was inspired upon his return to the United States to build his home, "Oakwood," in the country. The home was built in the Norman Romanesque Revival style which gained popularity in the mid 19th century. The architect was William Tinsley and "Oakwood" was his only Romanesque design. Isaac Graveson is reported as the manufacturer and Francis Pedretti as the interior designer. By the end of construction in 1866 the cost to build the home was $500,000. Tinsley decided to unite limestone and sandstone in the construction of "Oakwood" which was successful and influenced the use of those materials in future residences in Cincinnati. The initials "HP" for Henry Probasco and "JA" for Julia Amanda are located on the gable along with the date "1860." Tinsley also put his monogrammed initials "T" over a "W." The house is 170 ft. long and 70 ft. wide, fronting southwardly.

The original landscaping was by Adolph Strauch.

== See also ==
- Probasco Fountain
