= Frederic Littman =

Sculptor (1907–1979)

Frederic Littman (1907–1979) was a Hungarian-American sculptor, whose large sculpted public artwork, frequent collaborations with architect Pietro Belluschi, and four decades of teaching "left a towering artistic legacy in Oregon".

== Life ==
Littman was born in Hidegszamos, Austria-Hungary (now Gilău, Cluj County, Romania). He studied in Budapest and then at the Académie Julian in Paris. By 1931 he'd shown at the Salon d'Automne and entered the École nationale supérieure des Beaux-Arts; by 1934 he was a full professor and had worked under Charles Malfray at the Académie Ranson, where he met his wife, Austrian-born fellow sculptor Marianne Gold (1907–1999).

As Jews, Littman and his wife fled Europe and came to the United States in 1940. After a brief stint at Antioch College in Ohio, they came to Reed College in Portland, Oregon, where Littman was artist-in-residence until 1945. After a collegial divorce, Marianne Gold Littman continued at Reed until the 1950s. They remained lifelong friends.

Littman became instructor of sculpture at the Museum Art School of the Portland Art Museum, now the independent Pacific Northwest College of Art. He taught there until being named associate professor at Portland State University until his retirement in 1973. Among his students was Manuel Izquierdo.

== Work ==
Littman's work includes:

- eight marble vignettes on Oregon's industries, First National Bank Building, Salem, Oregon, with architect Belluschi, 1947 (razed 2017)
- sculpted copper low-relief doors, Zion Lutheran Church, Portland, with Belluschi, 1950
- War Memorial, marble sculpture on the facade of the Marion County Courthouse, Salem, Oregon, with Belluschi, dedicated 1954
- freestanding bronze Pioneer Woman, Council Crest Park, Portland, 1956
- Sedes Sapientiae (Seat of Wisdom), lead affixed relief, Clark Memorial Library, University of Portland, 1958
- interior work (bimah, rose window, and bronze ark doors depicting the Biblical account of the burning bush), Temple Beth Israel, Portland, 1960
- Farewell to Orpheus, bronze fountain sculpture on the campus of Portland State University, 1968
