= Pin Oak Fountain =

West Virginia landmark

Coordinates: 39.438803°N 78.451803°W

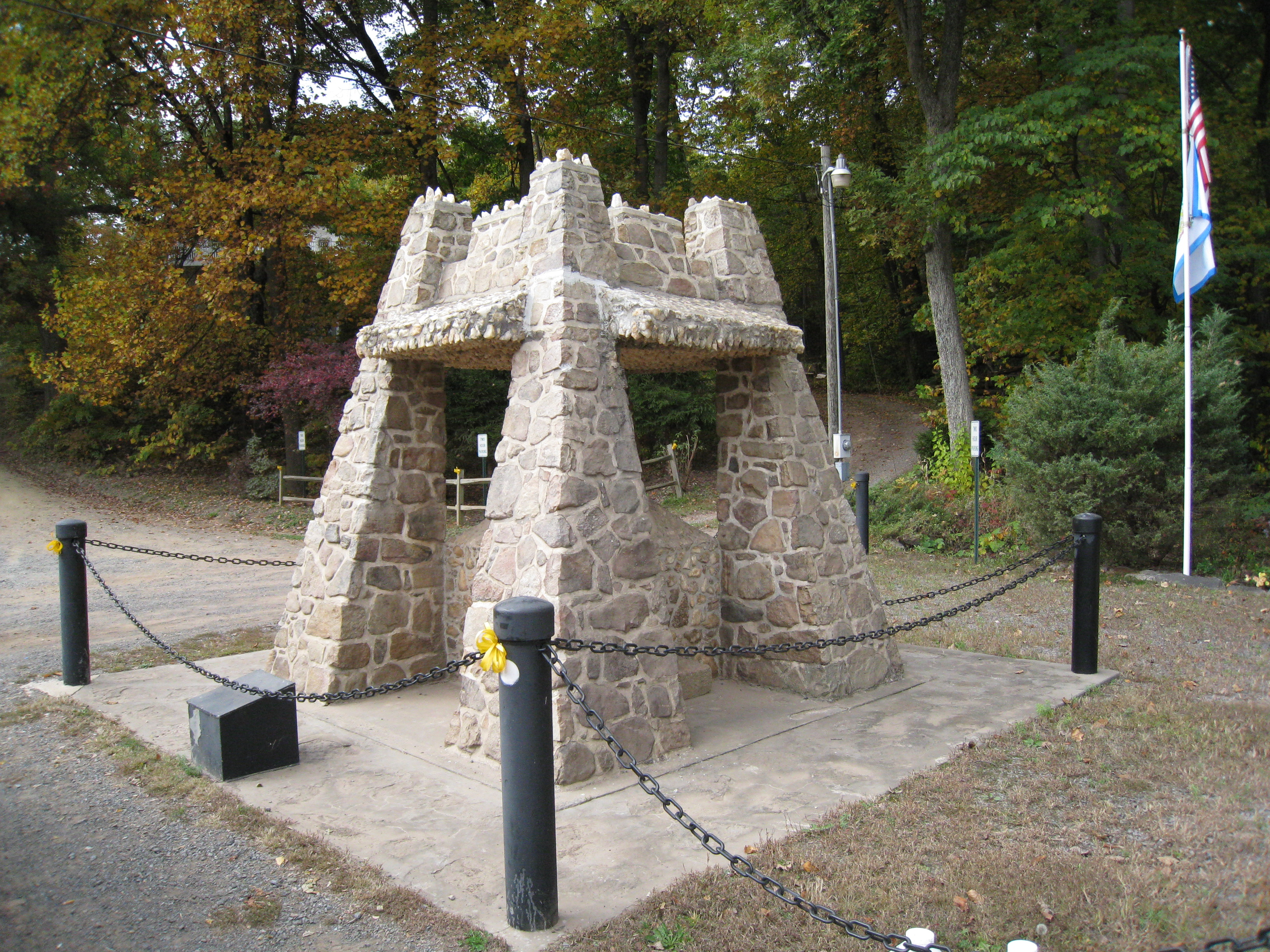
Pin Oak Fountain

The Pin Oak Fountain was built in the U.S. state of West Virginia by the West Virginia State Road Commission and local artisans in 1932 on land given by H.R. Edeburn. The crystal quartz used in construction was quarried from behind nearby Bloomery Iron Furnace on Diamond Ridge, and the stone from the hillside behind the fountain. The fountain's spring water is gravity fed from the hill above and continues to supply area residents and travelers. The fountain is a popular site for picnics, dances, courting, and auctions. Pin Oak Fountain was restored in 1988 and is maintained by the Pin Oak Extension Homemakers Club.

The fountain and its historical marker are located on West Virginia Route 29, eight miles southeast of Paw Paw in the community of Pin Oak. It was listed on the National Register of Historic Places in 2016.

== Image gallery ==
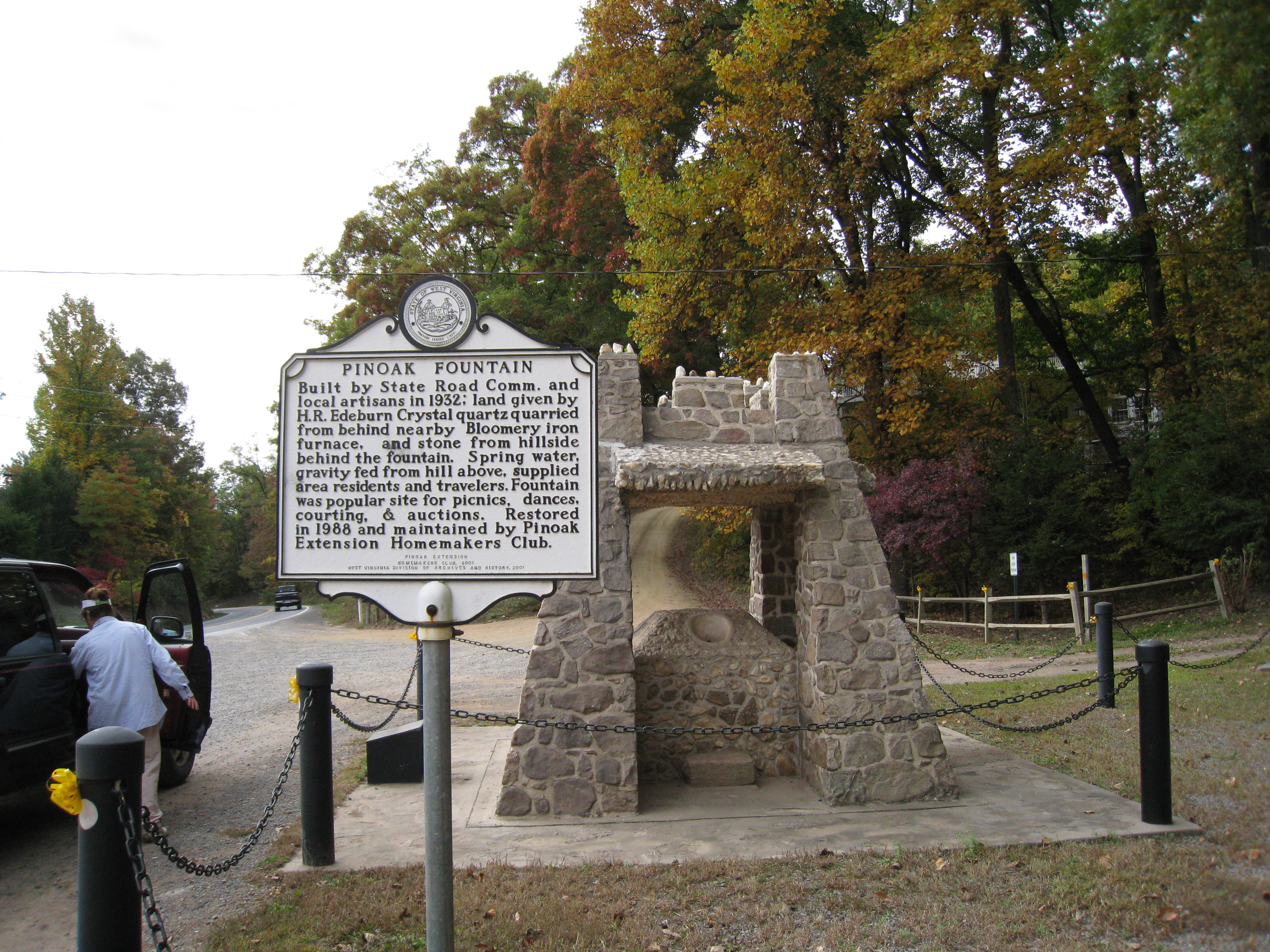

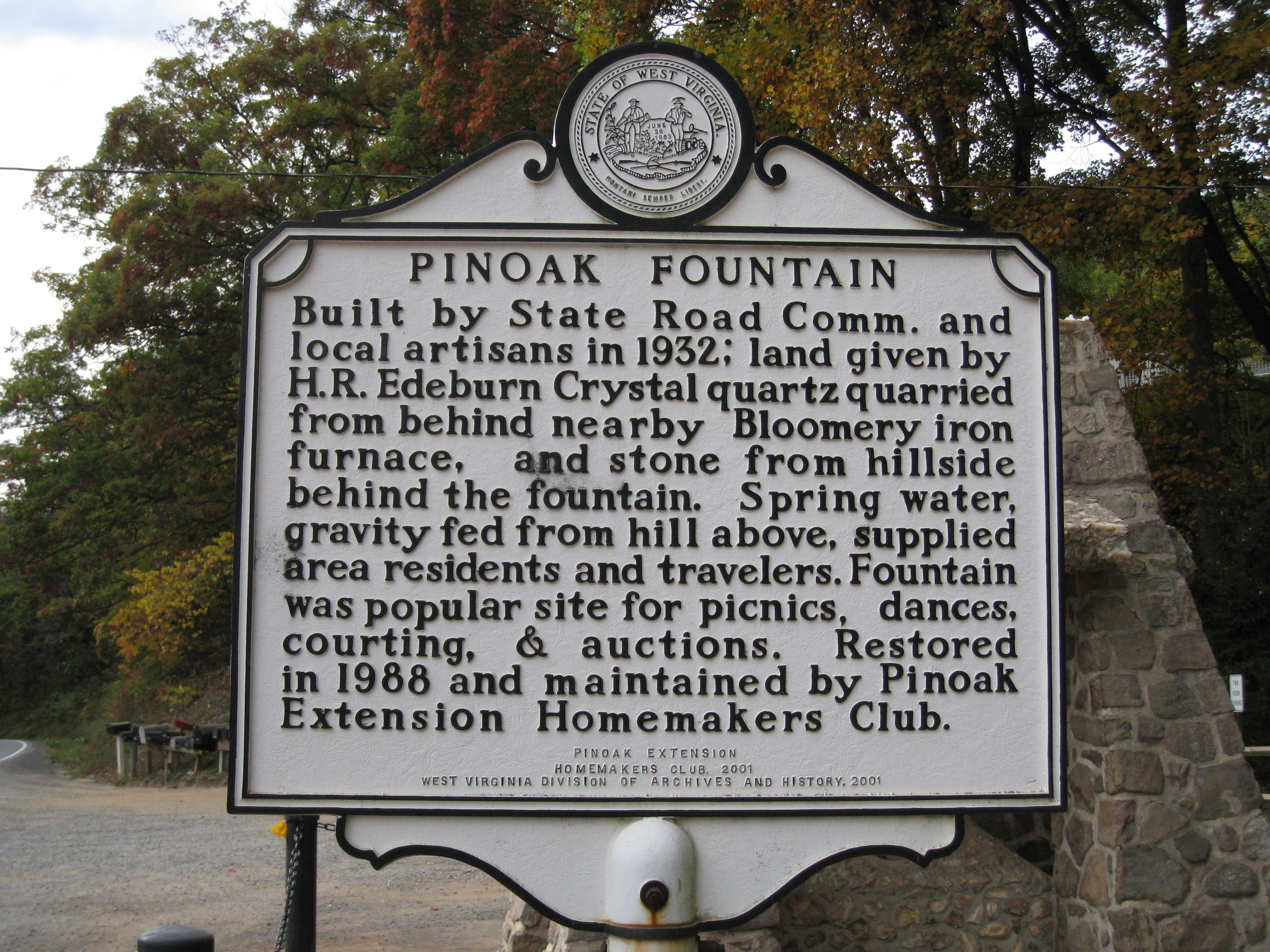

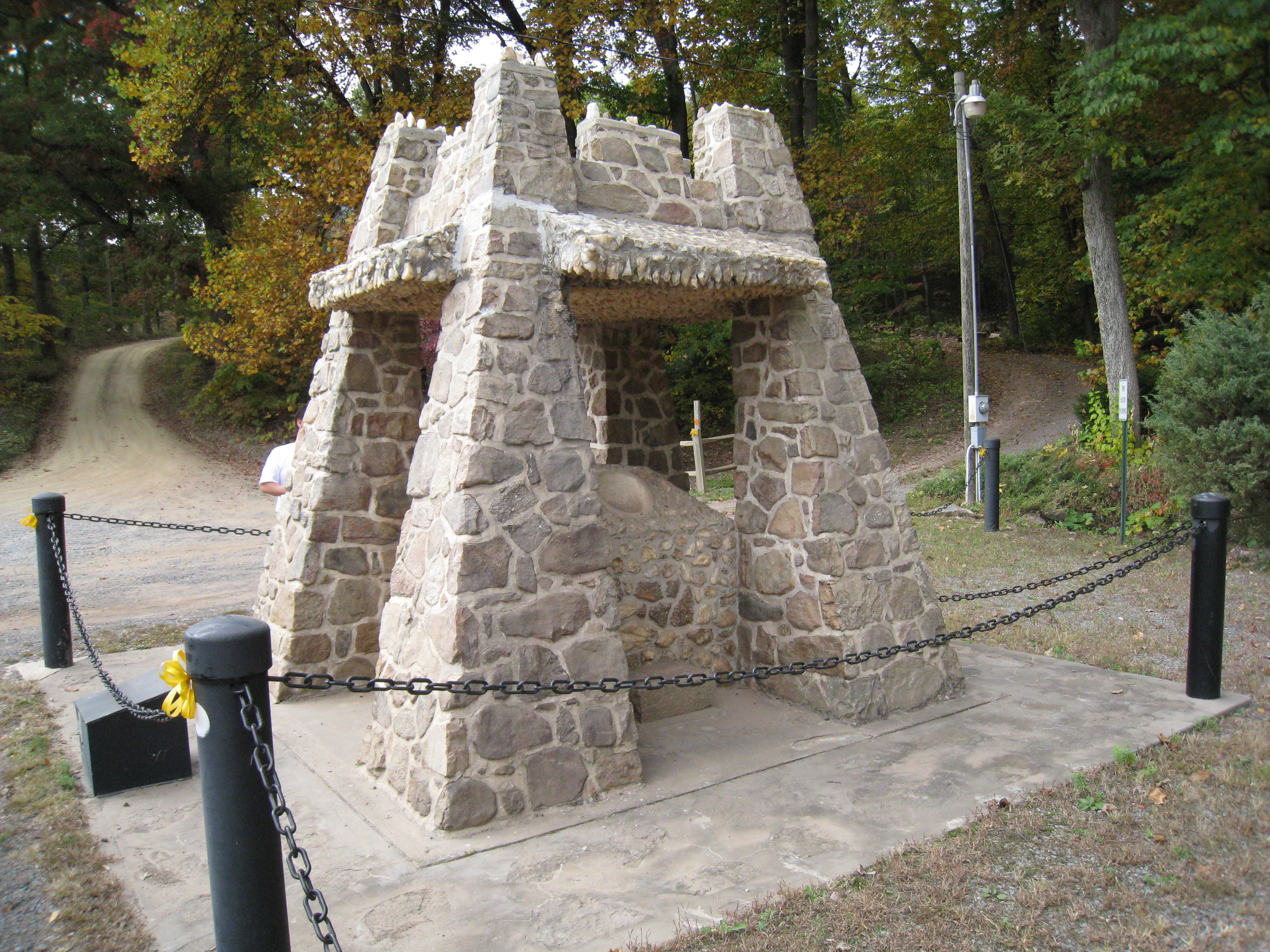

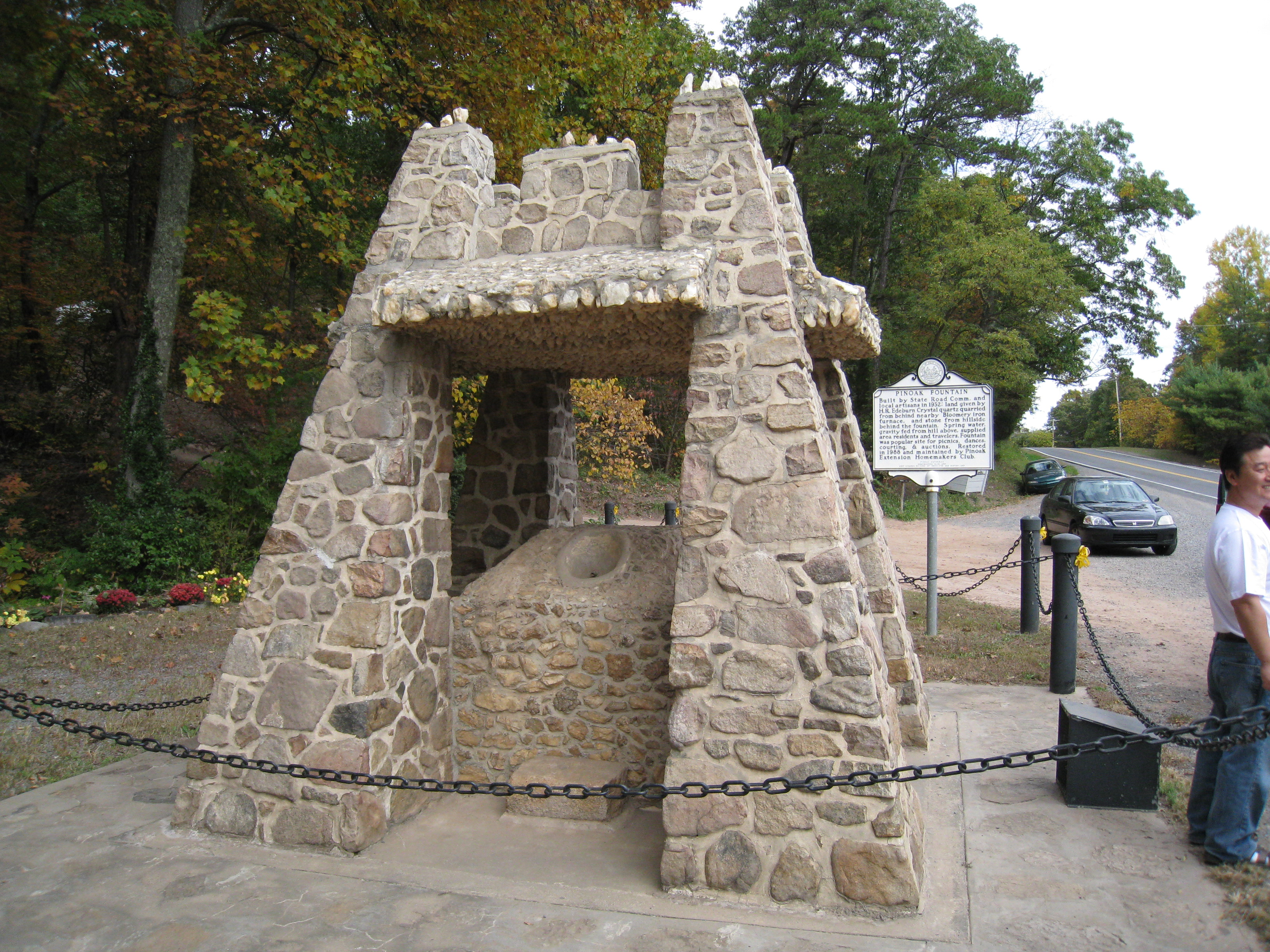

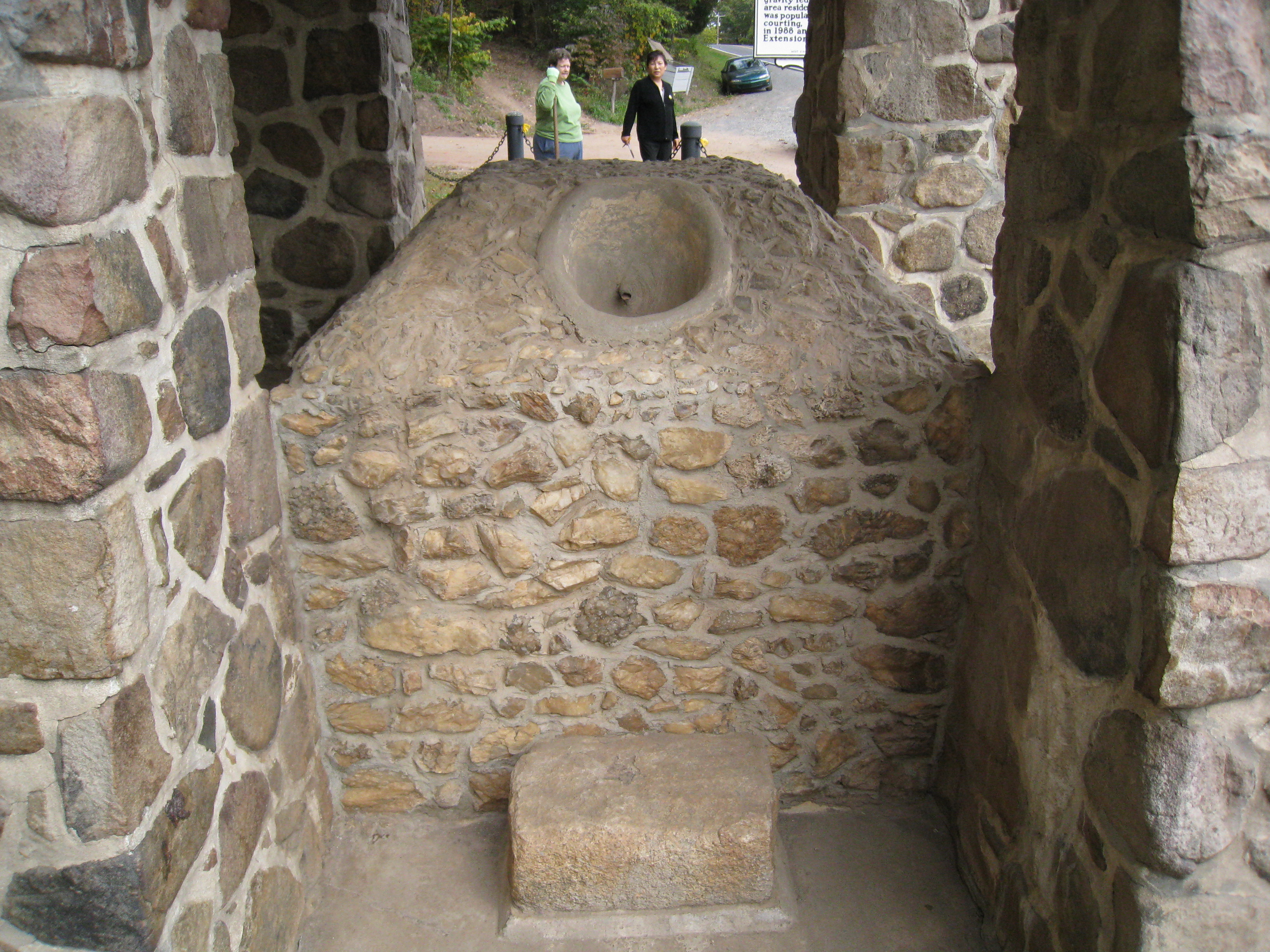

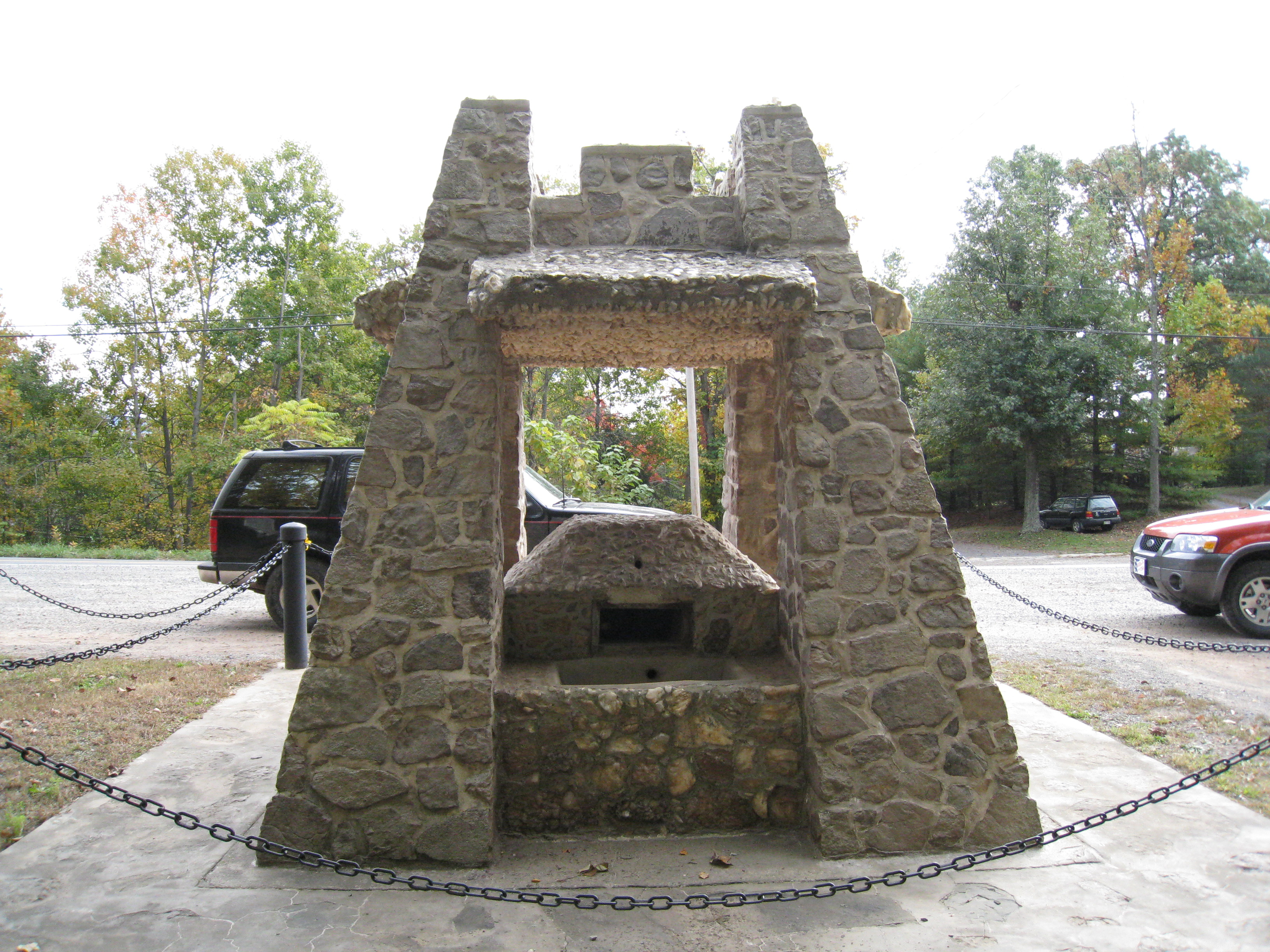

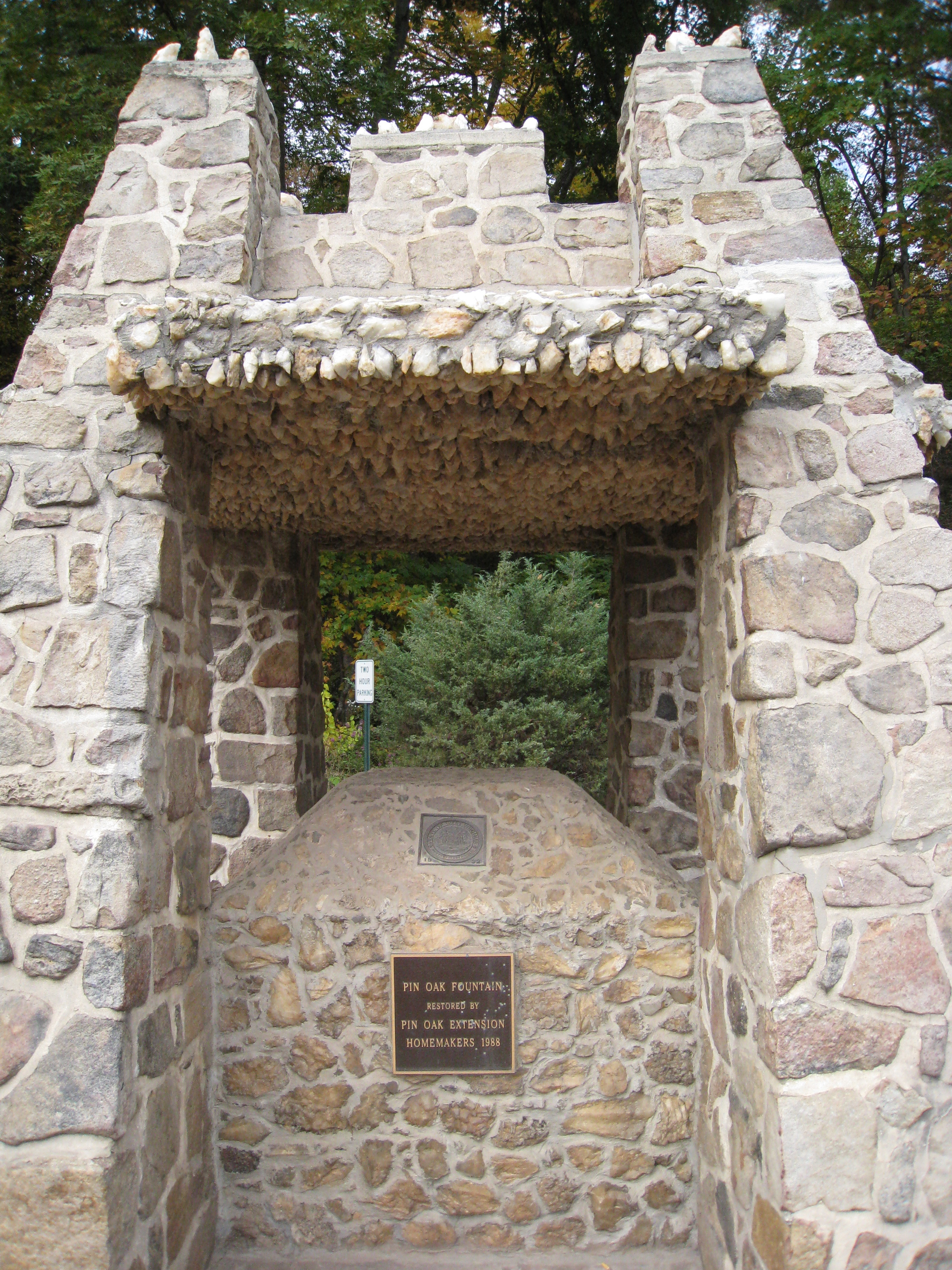

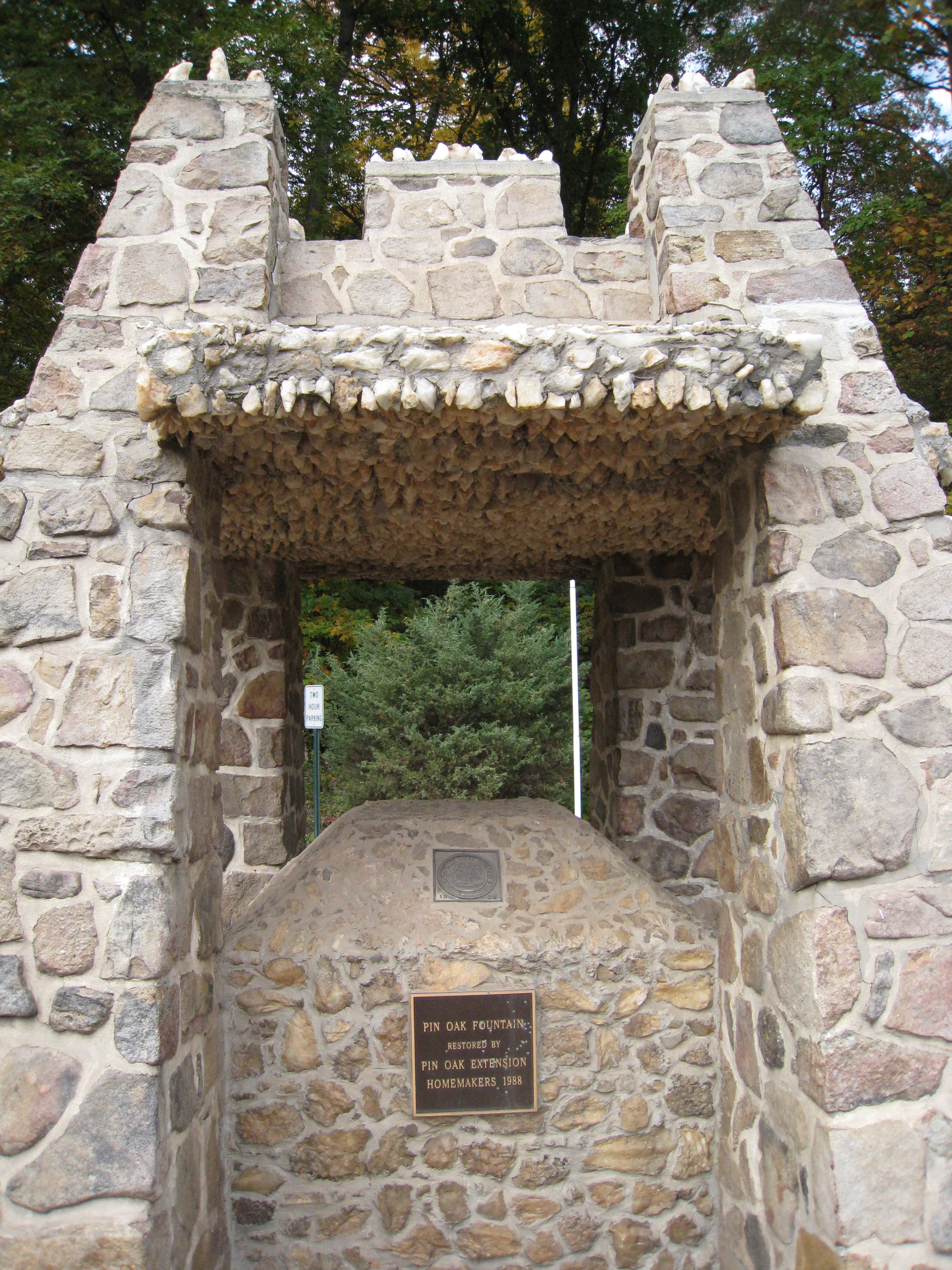
