= Albert Humphreys =

American sculptor and painter

Albert Humphreys (1864–1922) was an American sculptor and painter born near Cincinnati, Ohio. He studied in Paris with Gerome and Alexander Harrison.

Returning to the United States Humphreys worked from 1882 to 1884 at the Rookwood Pottery decorating Limoges pieces.

== Work ==
Humphreys' paintings and sculpture can be found in:

- National Gallery of Art, Washington D.C.
- Boston Public Library
- Detroit Institute of Art
- Bronx Community College, Bronx, New York
- Children's Fountain, Center Park, Manchester, Connecticut
