= Benson Bubbler =

Series of drinking fountains, mostly in Portland, Oregon, U.S.

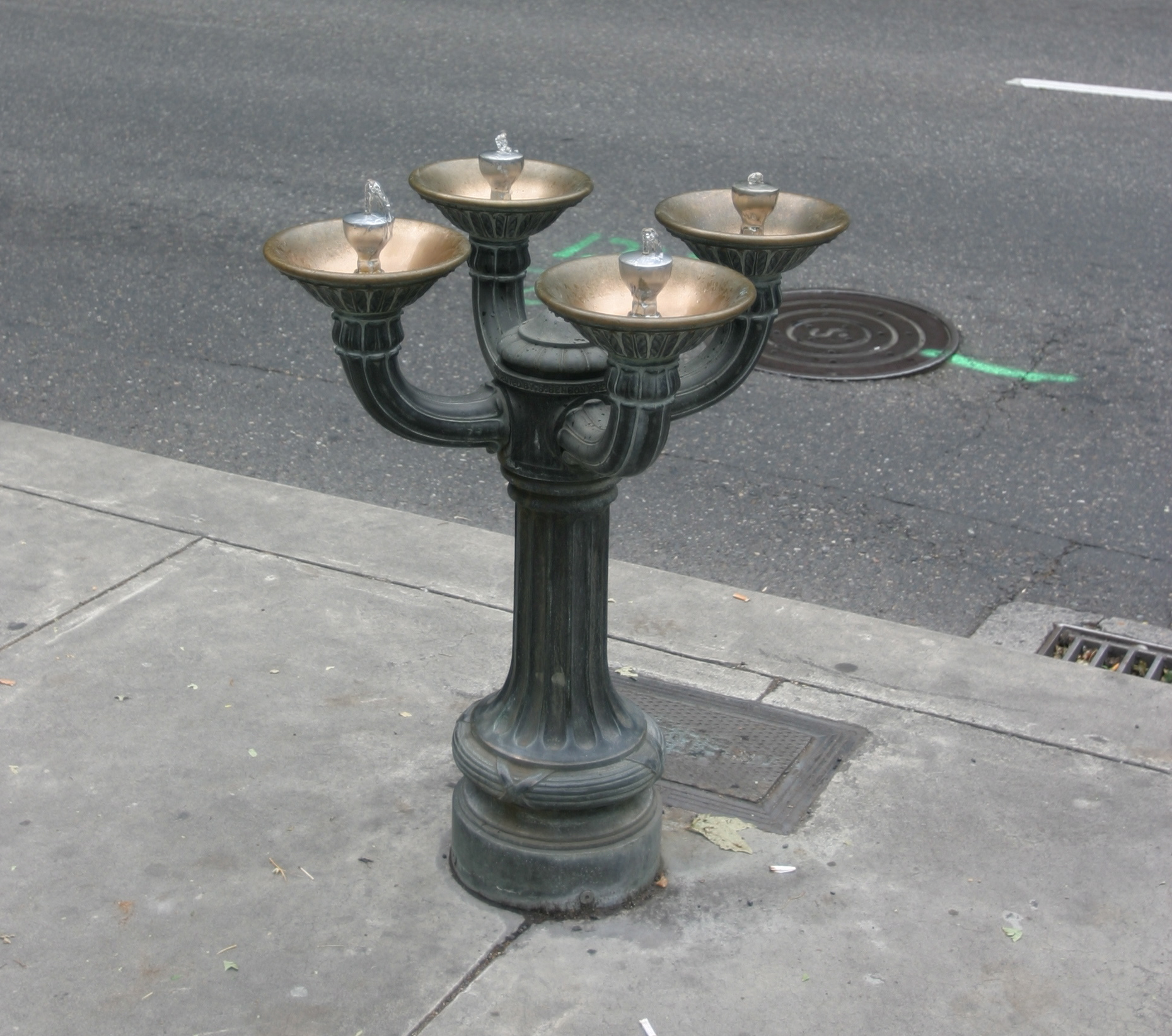
One of the many Benson Bubblers in downtown Portland, Oregon

Benson Bubblers are iconic bronze drinking fountains named after businessman and philanthropist Simon Benson (1852–1942), mostly located in Portland, Oregon, United States.

== Description and history ==
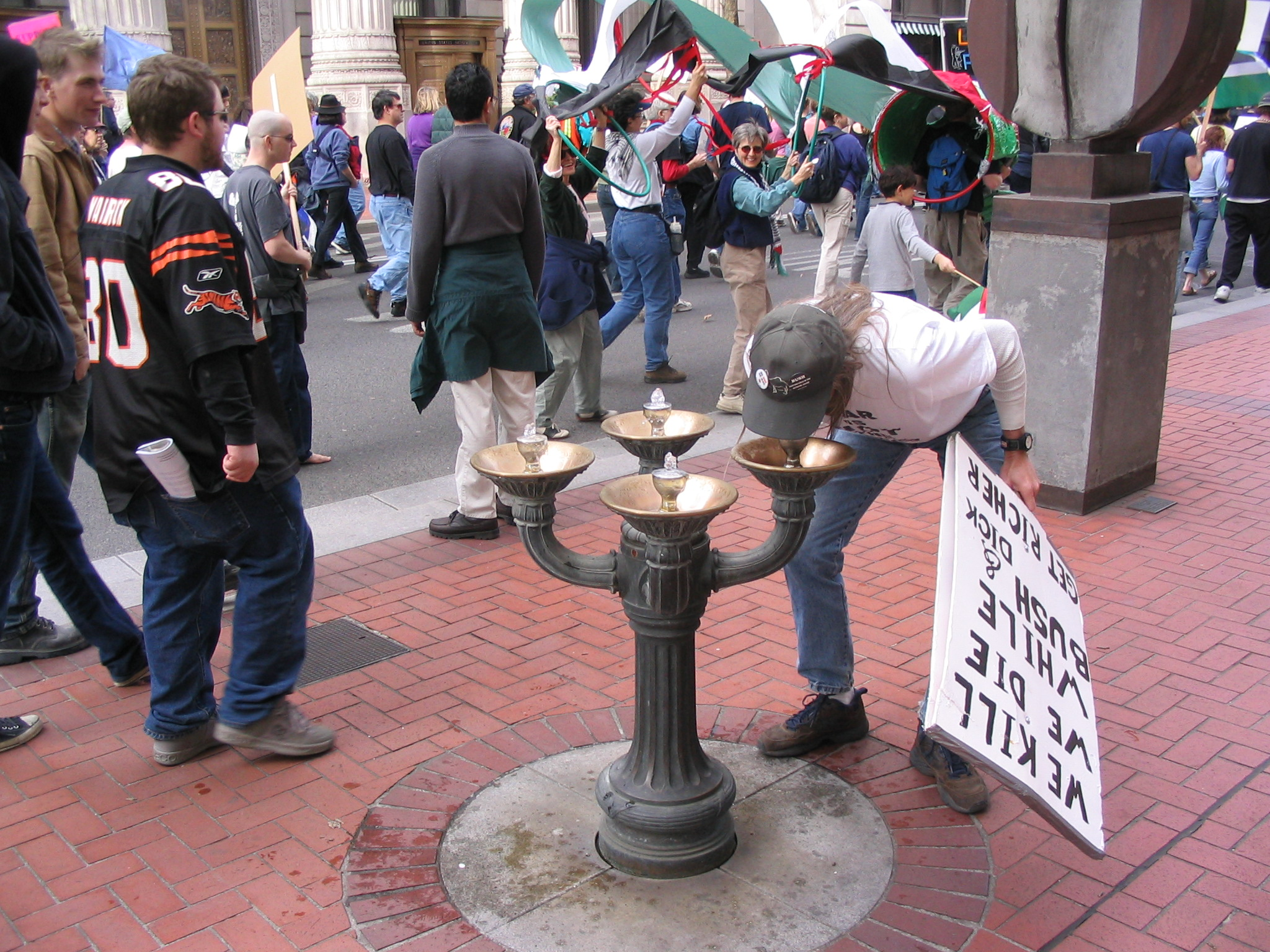
One of the fountains being used during an anti-war demonstration, 2004

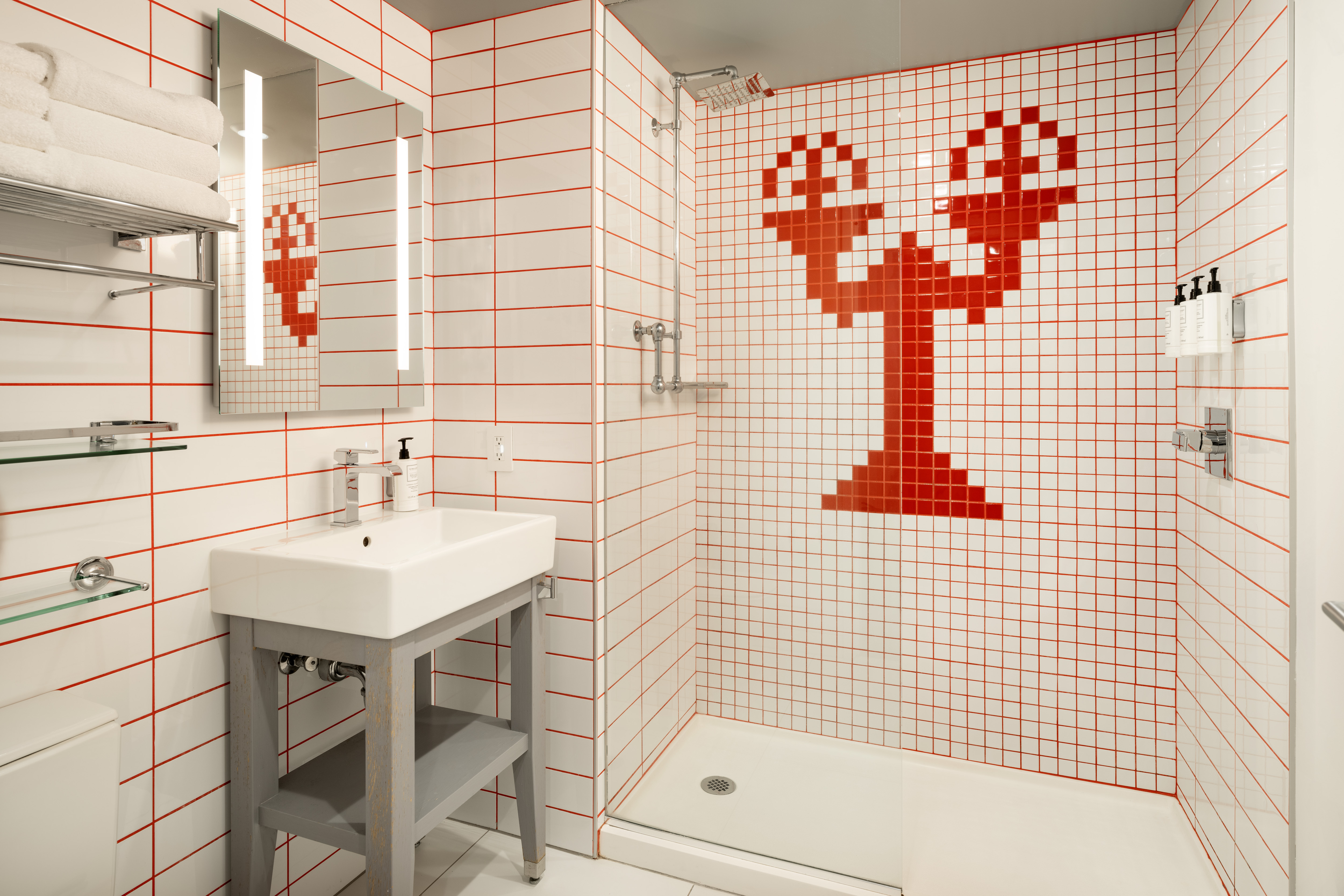
Shower artwork at Hotel Vance

In 1912, Benson donated $10,000 for the purchase and installation of 20 fountains; the designer was Portland architect A. E. Doyle.

Two reasons have been suggested for his decision to donate the fountains. One was his hope that they would reduce the consumption of alcoholic beverages during lunch breaks, and the other was that he felt the need after witnessing a girl crying at an Independence Day parade due to her inability to find a drink of water. In the 1970s, the Benson family requested that the bubblers only be installed within specific boundaries of Downtown Portland "so as not to diminish the uniqueness of them".

Also commonly known simply as "Benson fountains", additional bubblers replicating the original style have been cast and installed over the years. Construction of the Portland Transit Mall in 1976–77 included the addition of 15 new Benson fountains.

According to the Portland Water Bureau, 52 "true" Benson Bubblers, each of which supports four bowls, can be found throughout downtown. Two bubblers exist outside Downtown Portland. In 1965, the City of Portland gifted one to its sister city, Sapporo, Japan. The other was installed at the Maryhill Museum of Art near Maryhill, Washington, by special request from Sam Hill, a friend to Simon Benson. Portland also features 74 single-bowl variations.

Combined, the fountains normally pour out close to 100,000 gallons of drinking water per day every day of the year, except during freezing weather. During periods of prolonged summer drought, the Water Bureau has turned them off for a period of time, both to conserve water and to encourage citizens to conserve during such times.

In 2018, Radisson Red Hotel, Portland, opened in downtown Portland with shower artwork that represents the Benson Bubbler. After an extended closure, the hotel reopened in 2021 as Hotel Vance, Portland, a Tribute Portfolio Hotel.

== See also ==
- Bronze and brass ornamental work
- Drinking fountains in the United States
- Fountains in Portland, Oregon
- Temperance fountain
