= List of Sigma Iota Epsilon chapters =

Sigma Iota Epsilon is an honorary and professional management fraternity. In the following list of chapters, active chapters are indicated in bold and inactive chapters and institutions are in italics.

Chapter	Charter date and range	Institution	City	State or country	Division	Status	Ref.
Apha	January 1927–xxxx ?	University of Illinois Urbana-Champaign	Urbana	Illinois		Inactive	(Note: Chapter formed by absorbing a local management fraternity.)
Beta	1927–19xx ?	Syracuse University	Syracuse	New York		Inactive	
Gamma	1927–xxxx ?	University of Texas at Austin	Austin	Texas		Inactive	
Delta	1929–1960	Northwestern University	Evanston	Illinois		Inactive	
Epsilon	1946–19xx ?	Illinois Institute of Technology	Chicago	Illinois		Inactive	
Zeta	1949–1960	Louisiana Tech University	Ruston	Louisiana		Inactive	
**Eta**	1951	Texas Tech University	Lubbock, Texas	Texas	Southwestern	Active	
Theta	1951–xxxx ?	Southern Methodist University	Dallas	Texas		Inactive	
**Kappa**	1955–19xx ?; 1995	Indiana University		Indiana	Midwestern	Active	
Lambda	1957–xxxx ?	University of Houston	Houston	Texas		Inactive	
**Mu**	1958	University of Colorado Boulder	Boulder	Colorado	Western	Active	
Nu	1959–xxxx ?	Wayne State University	Detroit	Michigan		Inactive	
Xi	1961–19xx ?	University of Cincinnati	Cincinnati	Ohio		Inactive	
**Omicron**	1962	University of Tulsa	Tulsa	Oklahoma	Southwestern	Active	
**Pi**	1963	Arizona State University	Tempe	Arizona	Western	Active	
**Rho**	1963	Northern Illinois University	DeKalb, Illinois	Illinois	Midwestern	Active	
Sigma	1966–19xx ?	University of Iowa	Iowa City	Iowa		Inactive	
Tau	1966–xxxx ?	San Diego State University	San Diego	California		Inactive	
Upsilon	1967–xxxx ?	University of Denver	Denver	Colorado		Inactive	
**Phi**	1968	University of North Texas	Denton, Texas	Texas	Southwestern	Active	
Chi	1968–19xx ?	Georgia State University	Atlanta	Georgia		Inactive	
Psi	1968–xxxx ?	Trinity University	San Antonio	Texas		Inactive	
Omega	1969–xxxx ?	Western Michigan University	Kalamazoo	Michigan		Inactive	
**Sigma Alpha**	1969	Florida State University	Tallahassee	Florida	Southeastern	Active	
**Sigma Beta**	1969	Air Force Institute of Technology	Dayton	Ohio	Midwestern	Active	
Sigma Gamma	1970–xxxx ?	Michigan State University	East Lansing	Michigan		Inactive	
Sigma Delta	1970–xxxx ?	University of Arkansas	Fayetteville	Arkansas		Inactive	
**Sigma Epsilon**	1971	Central Michigan University	Mount Pleasant	Michigan	Midwestern	Active	
**Sigma Zeta**	1971	University of Dallas Irving	Texas	Southwestern	Active		
**Sigma Eta**	1971	Texas A&M University	College Station	Texas	Southwestern	Active	
**Sigma Theta**	1973	University of Georgia	Athens	Georgia	Southeastern	Active	
**Sigma Iota**	1971	Western Illinois University	Macomb	Illinois	Midwestern	Active	
**Sigma Kappa**	1972	Baylor University	Waco	Texas	Southwestern	Active	
Sigma Lambda	1973–xxxx ?	United States Naval Academy	Annapolis	Maryland		Inactive	
Sigma Mu	1975–xxxx ?	Georgia Tech	Atlanta	Georgia		Inactive	
**Sigma Nu**	1975	Rider University	Lawrence Township	New Jersey	Eastern	Active	
**Sigma Xi**	1976	University of Wisconsin–Whitewater	Whitewater	Wisconsin	Midwestern	Active	
Sigma Omicron	1976–xxxx ?	California State University, Fresno	Fresno	California		Inactive	
Sigma Pi						Inactive	
Sigma Rho	1976–xxxx ?	Florida Institute of Technology	Melbourne	Florida		Inactive	
Sigma Sigma						Inactive	
**Sigma Tau**	1979	Baruch College	New York City	New York	Eastern	Active	
Sigma Upsilon						Inactive	
Sigma Phi						Inactive	
Sigma Chi						Inactive	
**Sigma Psi**	1979	Penn State University Park	State College	Pennsylvania	Eastern	Active	
Sigma Omega						Inactive	
Iota Alpha						Inactive	
**Iota Beta**	1980	University of Houston–Clear Lake	Houston	Texas	Southwestern	Active	
**Iota Gamma**	1980	University of Akron	Akron	Ohio	Midwestern	Active	
Iota Delta						Inactive	
Iota Epsilon						Inactive	
**Iota Zeta**	1981	Colorado State University	Fort Collins	Colorado	Western	Active	
**Iota Eta**	1981	University of Nebraska–Lincoln	Lincoln	Nebraska	Midwestern	Active	
**Iota Theta**	1981	Ball State University	Muncie	Indiana	Midwestern	Active	
Iota Iota						Inactive	
**Iota Kappa**	1982	Stephen F. Austin State University	Nacogdoches	Texas	Southwestern	Active	
Iota Lambda						Inactive	
**Iota Mu**	1982	University of Tennessee at Chattanooga	Chattanooga	Tennessee	Southeastern	Active	
Iota Nu						Inactive	
Iota Xi						Inactive	
Iota Omicron						Inactive	
**Iota Pi**	1988	University of Southern Mississippi	Hattiesburg	Mississippi	Southeastern	Active	
Iota Rho						Inactive	
**Iota Sigma**	1984	California State University, Bakersfield	Bakersfield	California	Western	Active	
**Iota Tau**	1985	University of Baltimore	Baltimore	Maryland	Eastern	Active	
**Iota Upsilon**	1987	University of Rhode Island	Kingston	Rhode Island	Eastern	Active	
**Iota Phi**	1985	University of Toledo	Toledo	Ohio	Midwestern	Active	
**Iota Chi**	1983	Lamar University	Beaumont	Texas	Southwestern	Active	
**Iota Psi**	1984	East Carolina University	Greenville	North Carolina	Southeastern	Active	
**Iota Omicron**	1988	Illinois State University	Normal	Illinois	Midwestern	Active	
**Epsilon Alpha**	1993	University of Massachusetts Lowell	Lowell	Massachusetts	Eastern	Active	
**Epsilon Beta**	1989	New Mexico State University	Las Cruces	New Mexico	Western	Active	
**Epsilon Gamma**	1990	Auburn University	Auburn	Alabama	Southeastern	Active	
Epsilon Delta						Inactive	
Epsilon Epsilon						Inactive	
**Epsilon Zeta**	1990	University of New Orleans	New Orleans	Louisiana	Southeastern	Active	
**Epsilon Eta**	1991	United States Coast Guard Academy	New London	Connecticut	Eastern	Active	
**Epsilon Theta**	1992	Utah State University	Logan	Utah	Western	Active	
**Epsilon Iota**	1992	Penn State Harrisburg	Lower Swatara Township	Pennsylvania	Eastern	Active	
Epsilon Kappa						Inactive	
**Epsilon Lambda**	1993	Wright State University	Dayton	Ohio	Midwestern	Active	
**Epsilon Mu**	1994	Appalachian State University	Boone	North Carolina	Southeastern	Active	
**Epsilon Nu**	1994	Dominican University	River Forest	Illinois	Midwestern	Active	
**Epsilon Xi**	1994	Louisiana State University Shreveport	Shreveport	Louisiana	Southeastern	Active	
Epsilon Omicron						Inactive	
**Epsilon Pi**	1994	Salisbury University	Salisbury	Maryland	Eastern	Active	
**Epsilon Rho**	1994	Louisiana State University	Baton Rouge	Louisiana	Southeastern	Active	
**Epsilon Sigma**	1994	St. John's University	Queens, New York City	New York	Eastern	Active	
**Epsilon Tau**	1994	University of Mary Hardin–Baylor	Belton	Texas	Southwestern	Active	
**Epsilon Upsilon**	1996	University of North Dakota	Grand Forks	North Dakota	Midwestern	Active	
**Epsilon Phi**	1992	University of Arizona	Tucson	Arizona	Western	Active	
**Epsilon Chi**	1995	Alliant International University	San Diego	California	Western	Active	
**Epsilon Psi**	1995	California State University San Marcos	San Marcos	California	Western	Active	
**Epsilon Omega**	1992	York College of Pennsylvania	Spring Garden Township	Pennsylvania	Eastern	Active	
**Zeta Alpha**	1996	University of Missouri	Columbia	Missouri	Midwestern	Active	
**Zeta Beta**	1998	University of Memphis	Memphis	Tennessee	Southeastern	Active	
**Zeta Gamma**	1997	North Carolina A&T State University	Greensboro	North Carolina	Southeastern	Active	
Zeta Delta	1998	University of North Carolina at Charlotte	Charlotte	North Carolina		Inactive	
Zeta Epsilon						Inactive	
Zeta Zeta						Inactive	
**Zeta Eta**	1998	University of Wisconsin–Madison	Madison	Wisconsin	Midwestern	Active	
Zeta Theta						Inactive	
**Zeta Iota**	1999	Ithaca College	Ithaca	New York	Eastern	Active	
**Zeta Kappa**	2000	Niagara University	Lewiston	New York	Eastern	Active	
**Zeta Lambda**	1999	Missouri State University	Springfield	Missouri	Midwestern	Active	
**Zeta Mu**	2001	University of Phoenix	Phoenix	Arizona	Western	Active	
Zeta Nu	200x ?–2006?	Henry Cogswell College	Everett	Washington	Western	Inactive	(Note: Chapter ended when Henry Cogswell College closed in September 2006.)
Zeta Xi						Inactive	
Zeta Omicron						Inactive	
**Zeta Pi**	200x ?	Pace University	New York City	New York	Eastern	Active	
**Zeta Rho**	2004	Walden University	Minneapolis	Minnesota	Midwestern	Active	
**Zeta Sigma**	2004	Jaya Institute of Business Management	Palwancha	Telangana, India	International	Active	
**Zeta Tau**	2004	Western Washington University	Bellingham	Washington	Western	Active	
**Zeta Tau**	2006	Ohio Northern University	Ada	Ohio	Midwestern	Active	
**Zeta Upsilon**	2006	Black Hills State University	Spearfish	South Dakota	Midwestern	Active	
Zeta Phi						Inactive	
Zeta Chi						Inactive	
**Zeta Psi**	2008	Ursinus College	Collegeville, Pennsylvania	Pennsylvania	Eastern	Active	
Zeta Omega						Inactive	
**Theta Alpha**	2009	University of Oklahoma	Norman	Oklahoma	Southwestern	Active	
Theta Beta						Inactive	
**Theta Gamma**	2009	Lawrence Technological University	Southfield	Michigan	Midwestern	Active	
Theta Delta						Inactive	
**Theta Epsilon**	2011	Elon University	Elon	North Carolina	Southeastern	Active	
Theta Zeta						Inactive	
Theta Eta						Inactive	
Theta Theta						Inactive	
Theta Iota						Inactive	
Theta Kappa						Inactive	
**Theta Kappa**	September 23, 2011	Azusa Pacific University	Azusa	California	Western	Active	
Theta Lambda						Inactive	
**Theta Mu**	2011	West Chester University	West Chester	Pennsylvania	Eastern	Active	
**Alpha Nu**	September 2011	Nelson University (fmr. Southwestern Assemblies of God)	Waxahachie	Texas	Southwestern	Active	
**Alpha Xi**	2012	Merrimack College	North Andover	Massachusetts	Eastern	Active	
**Gamma Epsilon**	2015	Manhattan College	New York City	New York	Eastern	Active	
**Beta Upsilon**	September 16, 2015	James Madison University	Harrisonburg	Virginia	Southeastern	Active	
**Alpha Psi**	2019 Spring	Indiana University Bloomington O'Neill School of Public and Environmental Affairs	Bloomington	Indiana	Midwestern	Active	

== See also ==
- Honor society
- Professional fraternities and sororities
