= Cogswell Society =

American temperance group

The Cogswell Society is a social group founded in 1972 by employees of the Federal Trade Commission, whose office neighbors the landmark Temperance Fountain designed by Henry D. Cogswell. The society, which meets monthly at various bars around the Washington, D.C. area, is dedicated to "the study of man's excesses and the lack of temperance in past and present cultures." Members utter the society's oath, "To temperance; I'll drink to that," standing on one leg, in imitation of the heron that tops the temperance advocate's fanciful fountain.
