= Broadway Tower =

Broadway Tower may refer to:

- Broadway Tower (Enid, Oklahoma), a registered historic building in the United States
- Broadway Tower (Portland, Oregon)
- Broadway Tower (San Antonio), a building in Texas, United States
- Broadway Tower, Worcestershire, a folly in the United Kingdom
