= Temperance fountain =

Drinking fountain set up to encourage abstinence from alcohol

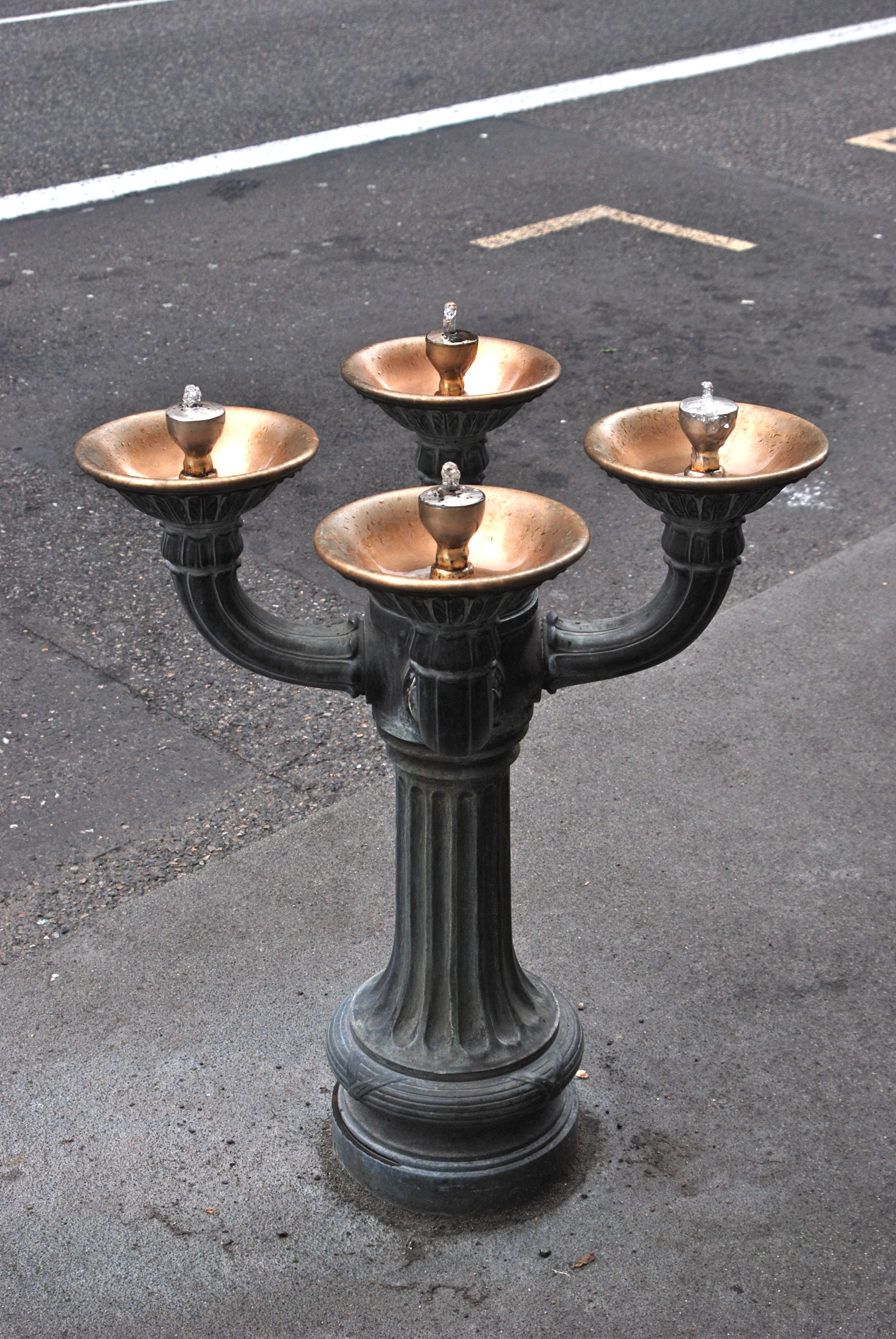
One of many "Benson Bubblers" in downtown Portland

A temperance fountain was a fountain that was set up, usually by a private benefactor, to encourage temperance, and to make abstinence from beer possible by the provision of clean, safe, and free water. The temperance societies had no real alternative as tea and coffee were too expensive, so drinking fountains were very attractive.

== Temperance fountains in the United States ==
Temperance fountains by Henry D. Cogswell

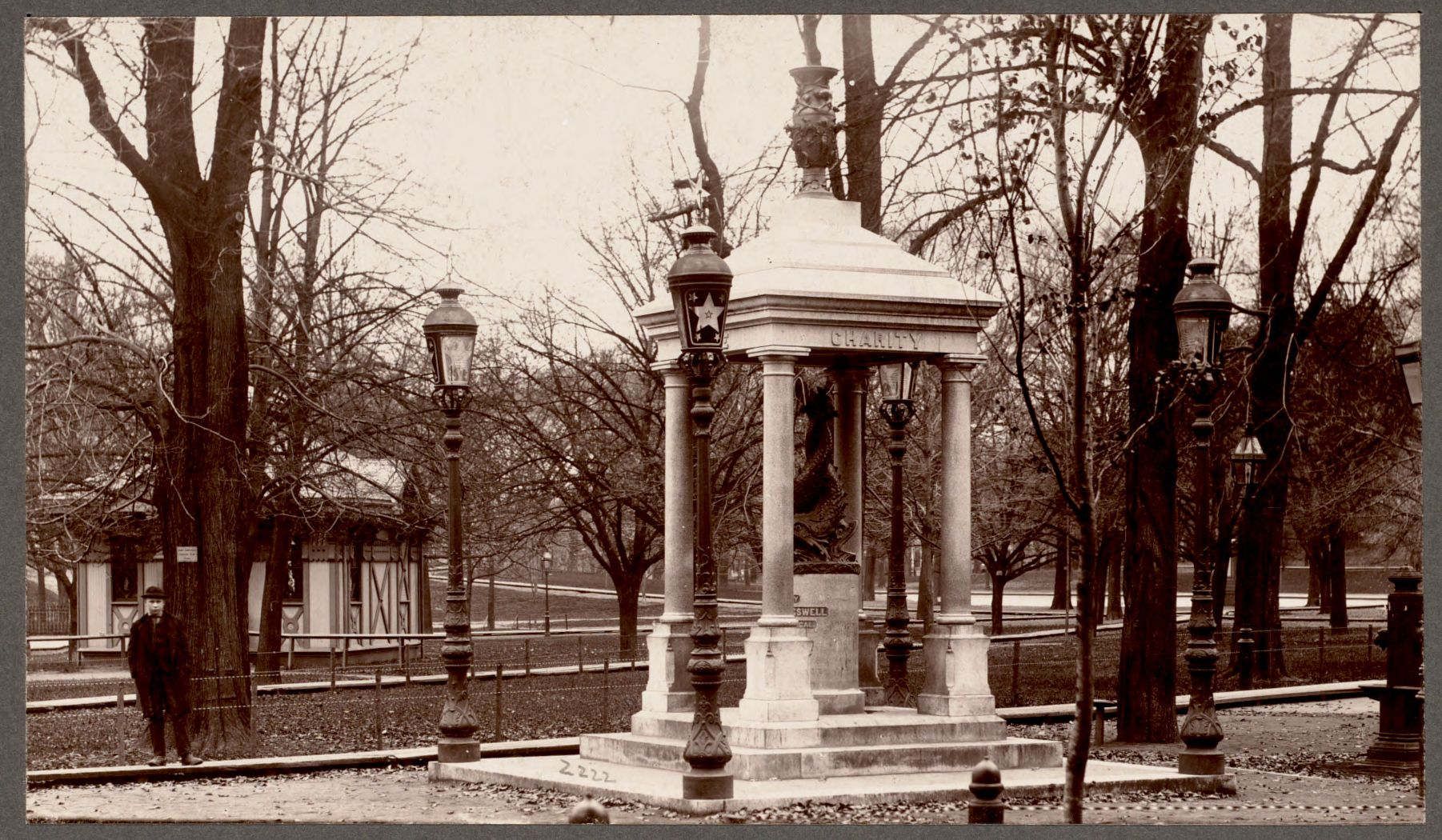
Boston Common, ca. 1890

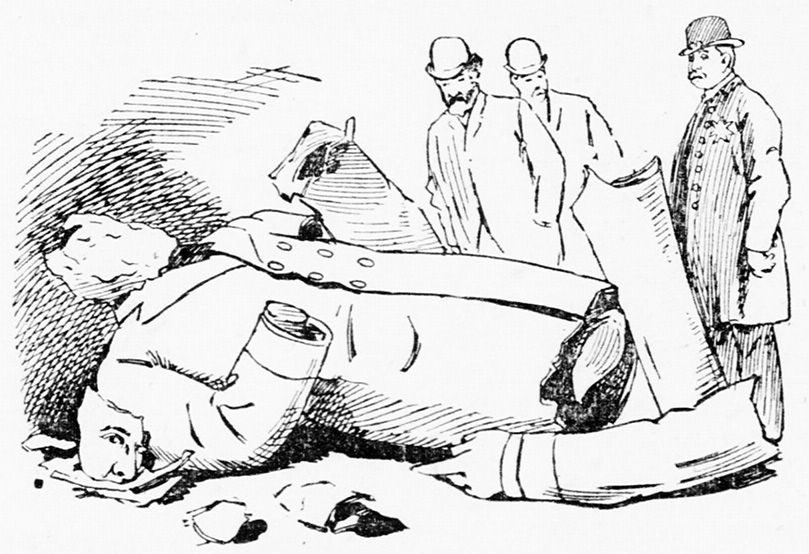
Destruction of Cogswell's fountain in San Francisco, 1894; San Francisco Call

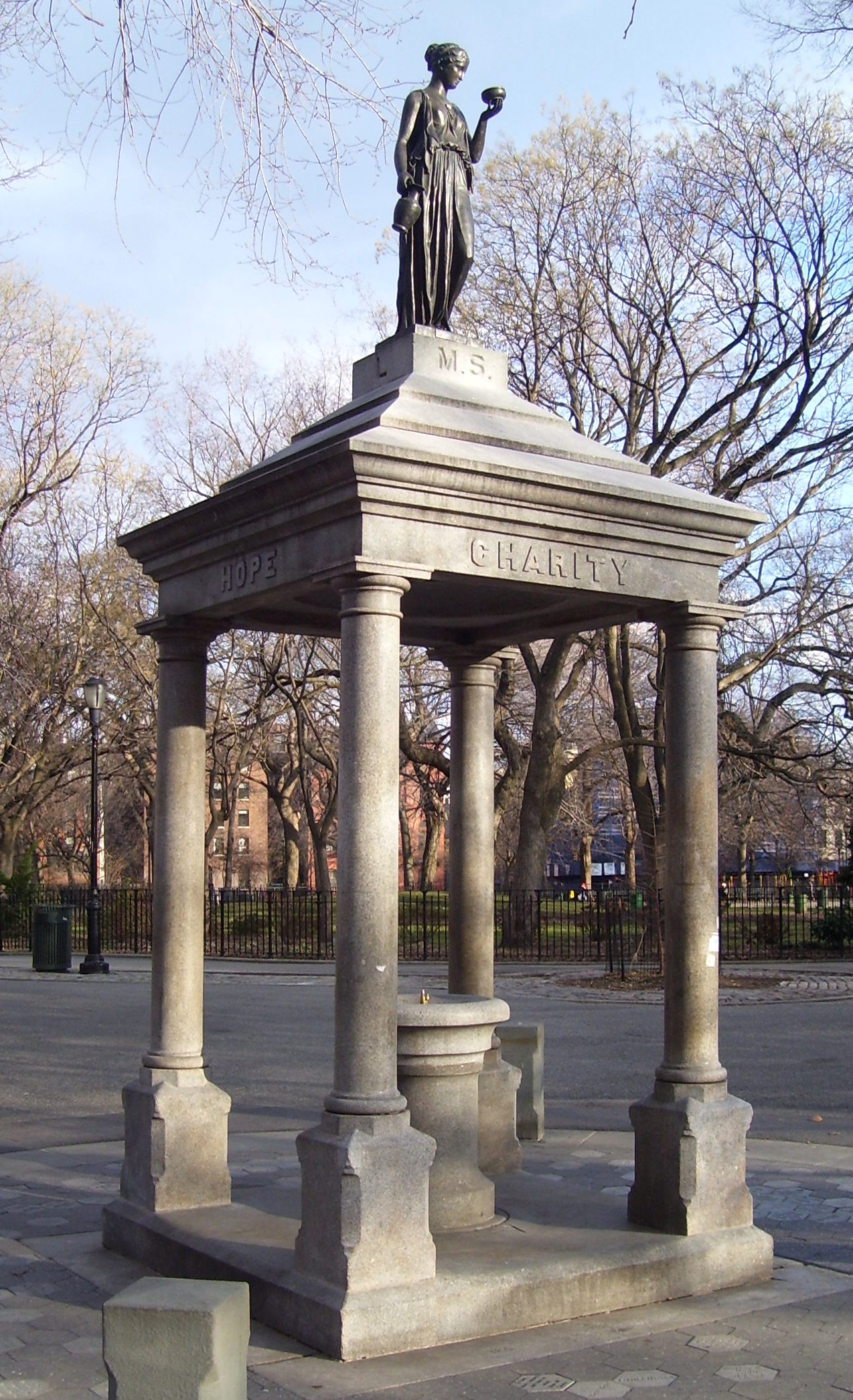
Tompkins Square Park, New York City

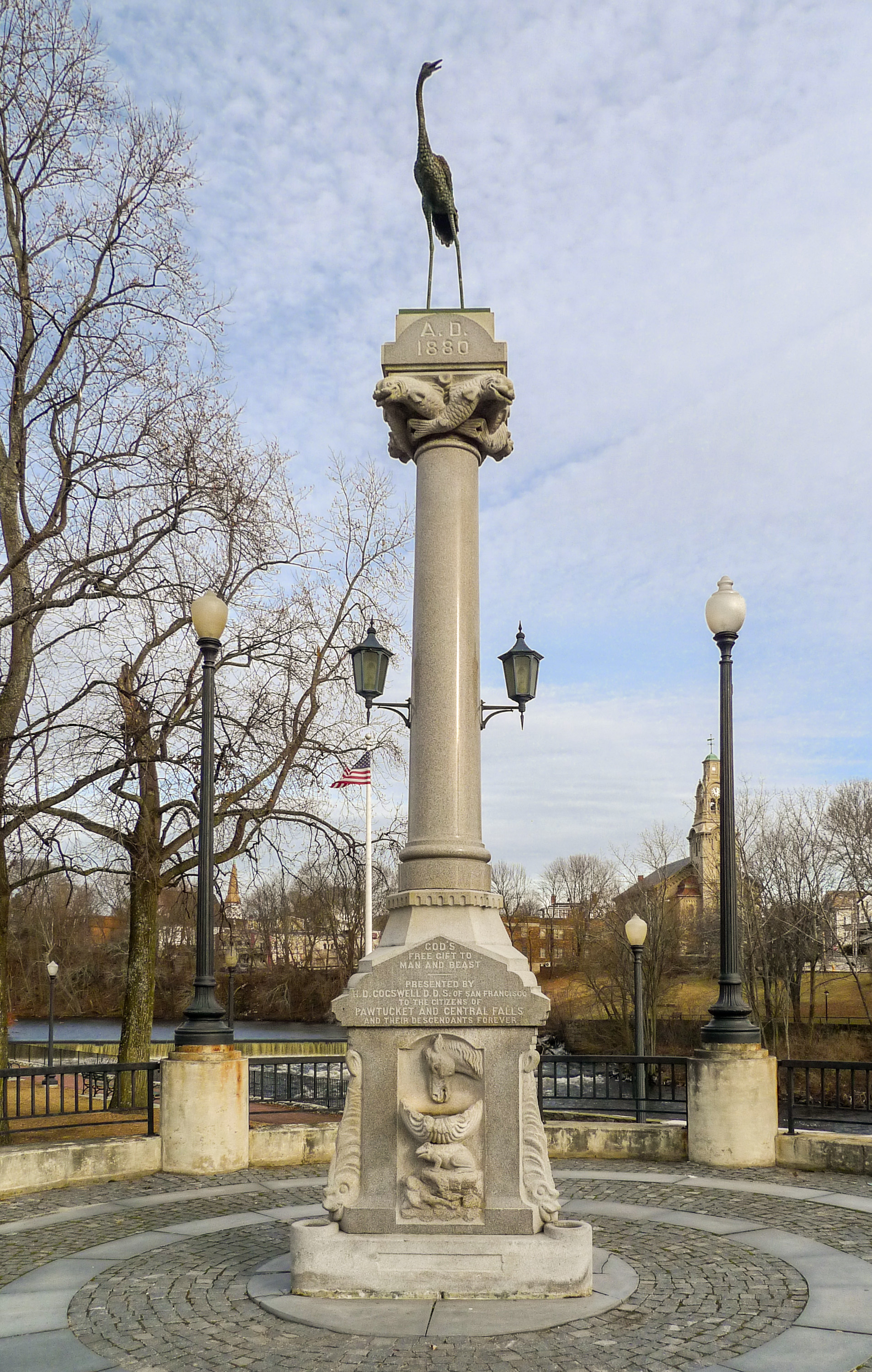
Pawtucket, Rhode Island

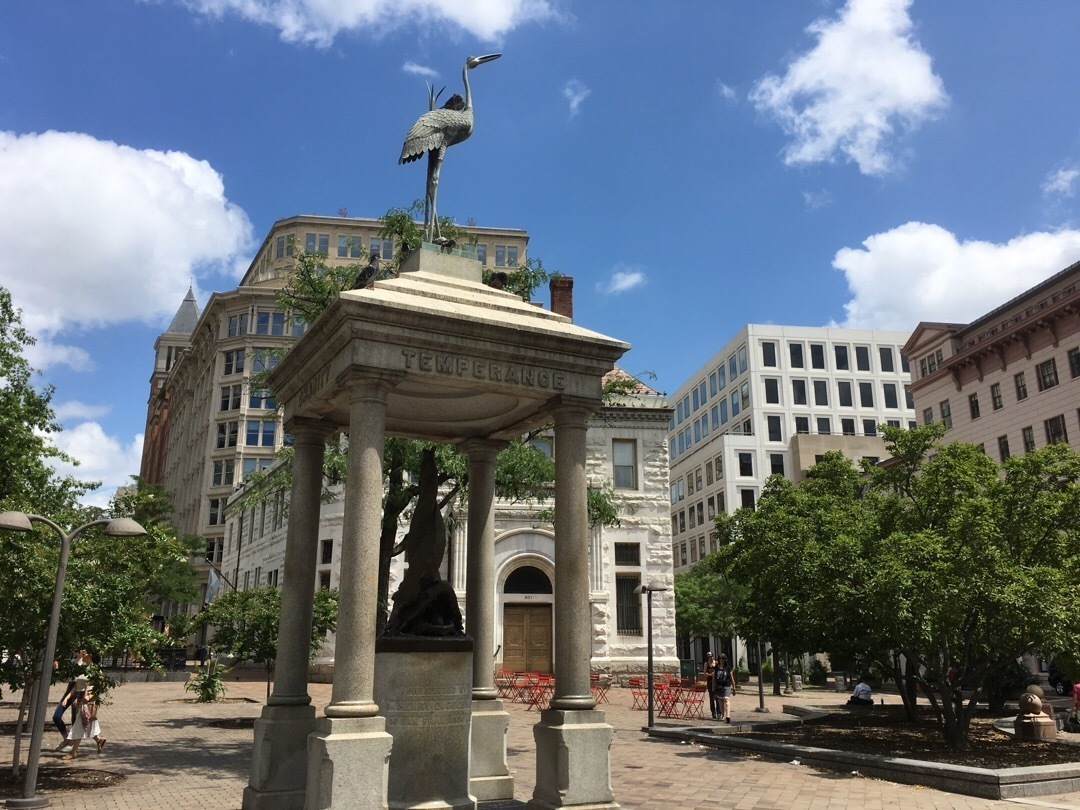
Washington, D.C.

Muddied and bad tasting drinking water encouraged many Americans to drink alcohol for health purposes, so temperance groups constructed public drinking fountains throughout the United States following the Civil War. The National Woman's Christian Temperance Union (NWCTU)'s organizing convention of 1874 encouraged its attendees to erect the fountains in their hometowns. The NWCTU advocated the fountains as a means to discourage people from entering saloons for refreshment. The NWCTU sponsored temperance fountains in towns and cities across the United States.

Cast-stone statues of Hebe were marketed for use in temperance fountains. In New York City, the James Fountain in Union Square Park is a Temperance fountain with the figure of Charity who empties her jug of water, aided by a child; it was donated by Daniel Willis James and sculpted by Adolf Donndorf.

In Washington DC "the" Temperance Fountain was donated to the city in 1882 by Temperance crusader Henry D. Cogswell. This fountain was one of a series of fountains he designed and commissioned in a belief that easy access to cool drinking water would prevent people from consuming alcohol. Under its stone canopy the words "Faith," "Hope," "Charity," and "Temperance" are chiseled. Atop this canopy is a life-sized heron, and the centerpiece is a pair of entwined heraldic scaly dolphins. Originally, visitors were supposed to freely drink ice water flowing from the dolphins' snouts with a brass cup attached to the fountain and the overflow was collected by a trough for horses, but the city tired of replenishing the ice in a reservoir beneath the base and disconnected the supply pipes. Other Cogswell fountains include one still standing in New York City's Tompkins Square Park, and one in downtown Pawtucket, Rhode Island (1880).

These grandiose statues were not all well received by the communities where they were placed. Washington, DC's Temperance Fountain has been called "the city's ugliest statue" and spurred city councils across the country to set up fine arts commissions to screen such gifts. Although the D.C. statue survived mostly unscathed, the California and Market Street, San Francisco Statue of Henry D. Cogswell and Fountain was pulled down on New Year's Eve Night of 1893-1894 by "a lynch party of self-professed art lovers" including Gelett Burgess (who was subsequently fired from his job at University of California at Berkeley),

Cogswell's 1879 Ben Franklin statue and temperance fountain in Washington Square, San Francisco remains unscathed to this day. One in Rockville, Connecticut, was thrown into Shenipsic Lake. In Dubuque, Iowa, a statue of Cogswell in Washington Park was pulled down by a group of vandals in 1900 and buried under the ground of a planned sidewalk. The next day the sidewalk was poured and the object was entombed. When new sidewalks were recently laid, the statue was not found.

Simon Benson, an Oregon lumberman, was a teetotaler who wanted to discourage his workers from drinking alcohol in the middle of the day. In 1912, Benson gave the City of Portland USD $10,000 for the installation of 20 bronze drinking fountains. As of March 2014, these fountains, known as "Benson Bubblers", remain functional in downtown Portland.

== Temperance fountains in the United Kingdom ==
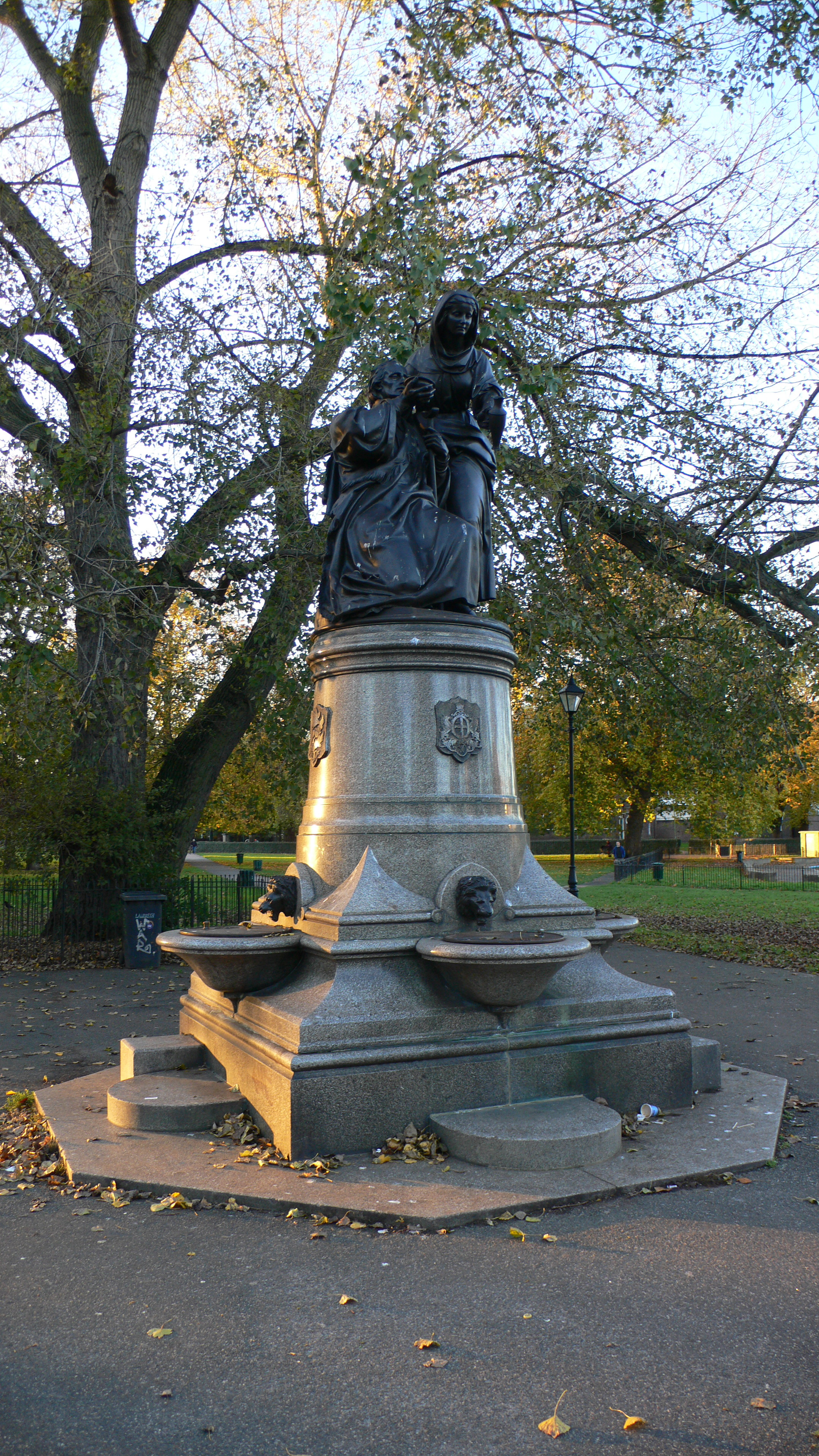
Temperance fountain in Clapham Common, London

The provision of drinking fountains in the United Kingdom was also linked to the temperance movement in the United Kingdom, with the Metropolitan Drinking Fountain and Cattle Trough Association in London drawing support from temperance advocates. Many of its fountains were sited opposite public houses. The evangelical movement was encouraged to build fountains in churchyards to encourage the poor to see churches as supporting them. Many fountains have inscriptions such as "Jesus said whosoever drinketh of this water shall thirst again but whosoever drinketh of the water I shall give him shall never thirst". By 1877, the association was widely accepted and Queen Victoria donated money for a fountain in Esher.

Many fountains, within London and outside, were called temperance fountains or would have a representation of the Greek mythical figure Temperance.

== Examples ==
Many temperance fountains were erected:

- Women's Christian Temperance Union Public Fountain in Shendendoah, Iowa
- Temperance Fountain (Washington, DC)
- Tompkins Square Park temperance fountain, New York City
- Woman's Christian Temperance Union Fountain in Rehoboth Beach, Delaware
- San Francisco temperance fountain
- Wallace fountains (Paris)
- 1912 WCTU Stone drinking Fountain (Arcata, CA)
- The Benson Bubblers in Portland, Oregon
