= U.S. Post Office and Customshouse (Everett, Washington) =

- U.S. National Register of Historic Places
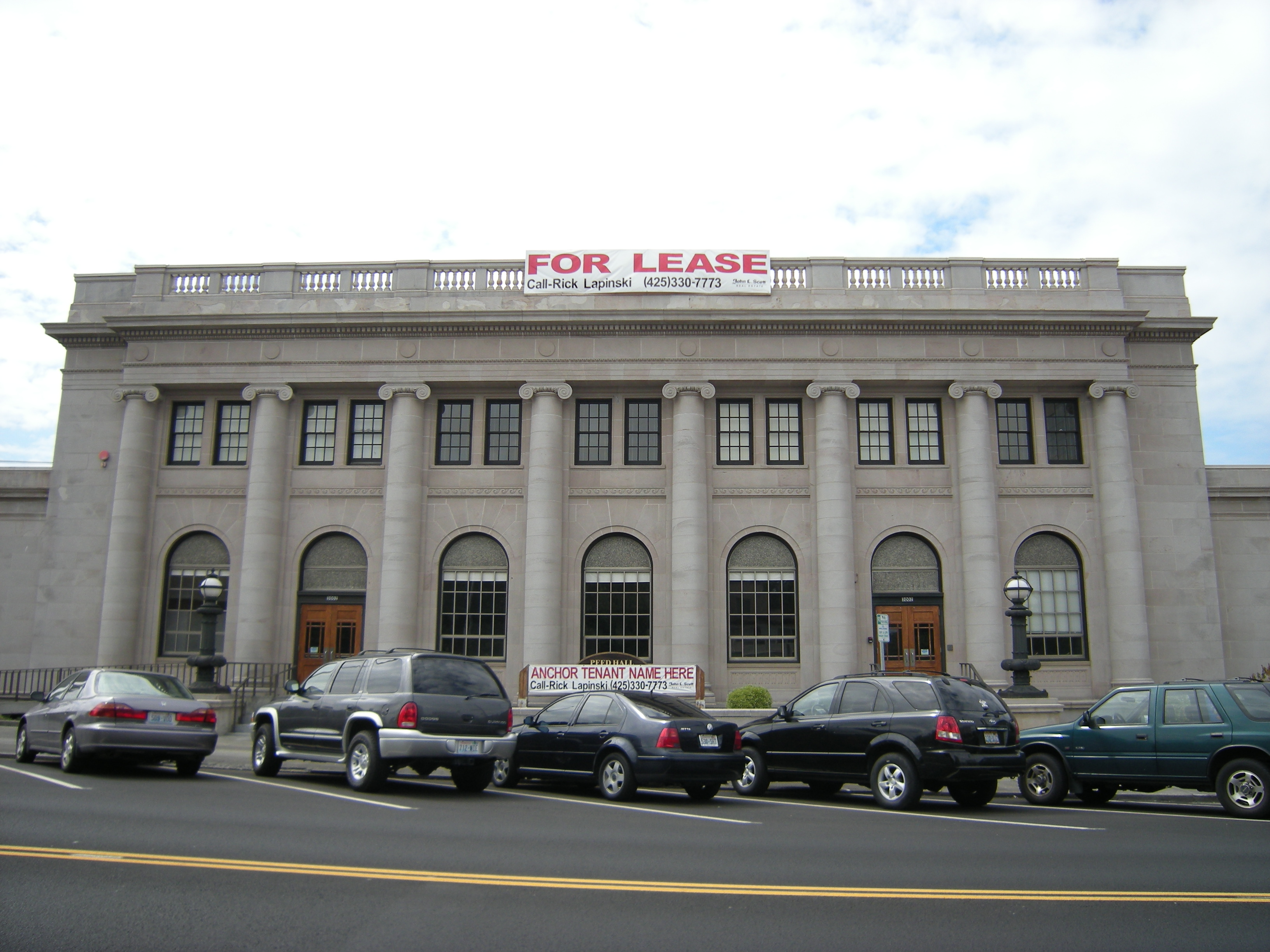

- Location within Washington (state)
- Location: 3006 Colby Avenue, Everett, Washington
- Coordinates: 47°58′40″N 122°12′27″W
- Area: less than one acre
- Built: 1917
- Architect: Oscar Wenderoth
- Architectural style: Neoclassical
- NRHP reference No.: 76001909
- Added to NRHP: June 22, 1976

The U.S. Post Office and Customshouse in Everett, Washington served as the city's main post office from 1917 to 1964. It has also been known as Federal Building. The building, designed in the Neoclassical form by Oscar Wenderoth, now houses the offices of the Chicago Title Company.

The two-story building's front facade features eight Greek Ionic columns. The reinforced concrete structure is finished with Wilkinson sandstone and granite quarried in Index.

On August 6, 1975, the building, then home to the Bureau of Indian Affairs, was bombed by an unknown assailant at the same time as a federal building in Tacoma.

The bureau turned the building over to the General Services Administration in the late 1990s, who prepared it for a possible sale. The city of Everett sought to acquire the building as the home to a museum, but faced competition from the Tulalip Tribes, who planned to house a post office in the building. Ultimately, the building was acquired in 2000 by the Henry Cogswell College for use as its main campus and renovated at a cost of $2 million. The college closed in 2006, selling the building to private developers in 2008 for $2.4 million. The Chicago Title Company moved into the building in 2009.
