= Temperance Fountain (Washington, D.C.) =

- U.S. National Register of Historic Places
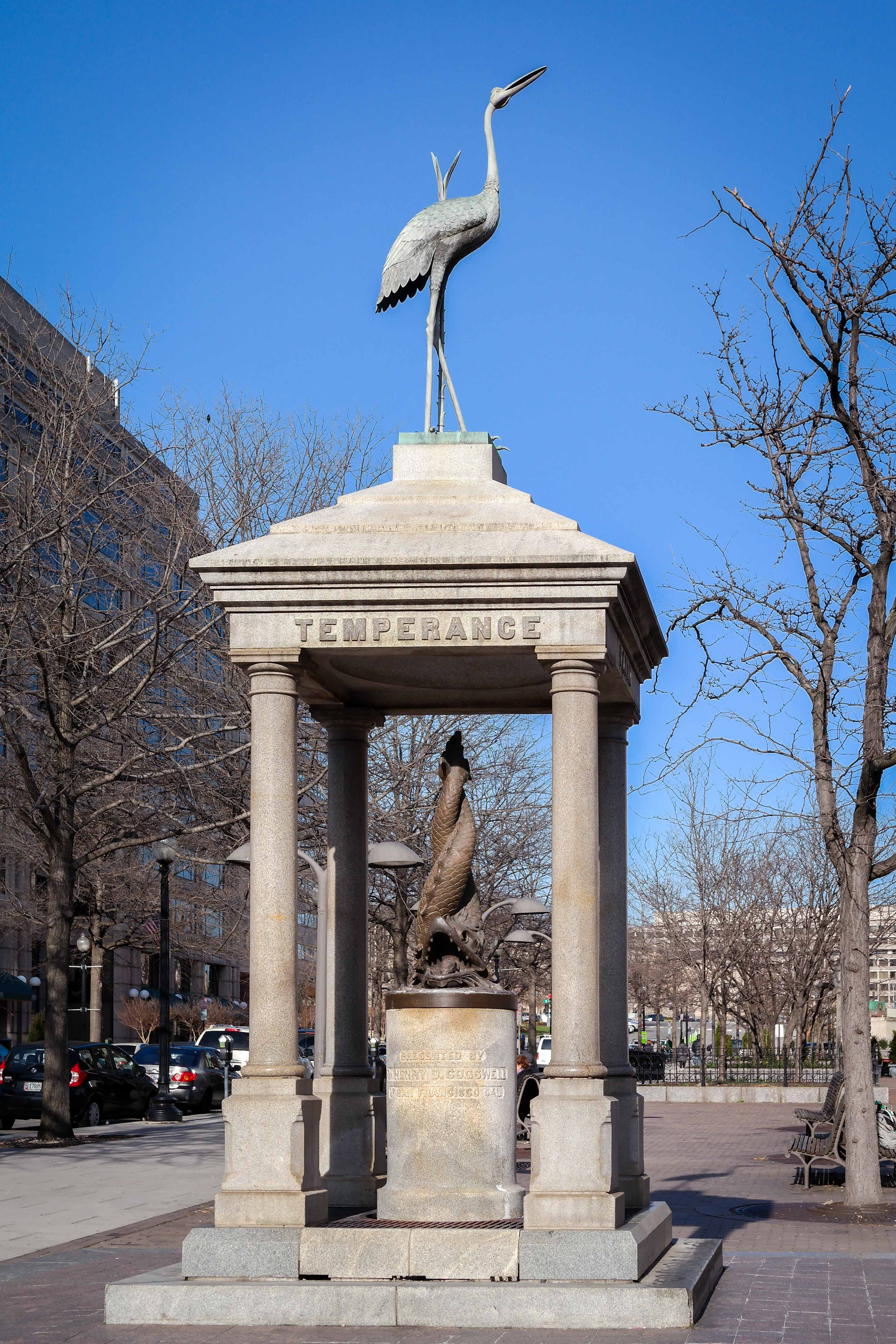

- Location within Central Washington, D.C. Location within the District of Columbia Location within the United States
- Location: 7th Street & Indiana Avenue, N.W., Washington, D.C.
- Coordinates: 38°53′37.6″N 77°1′18″W
- Area: less than one acre
- Built: 1884
- Architect: Henry D. Cogswell
- Architectural style: Late Victorian
- MPS: Memorials in Washington, D.C.
- NRHP reference No.: 07001061
- Added to NRHP: October 12, 2007

The Temperance Fountain is a fountain and statue located in Washington, D.C., donated to the city in 1882 by Henry D. Cogswell, a dentist from San Francisco, California, who was a crusader in the temperance movement. This fountain was one of a series of temperance fountains he designed and commissioned in a belief that easy access to cool drinking water would keep people from consuming alcoholic beverages.

== Design ==
The fountain has four stone columns supporting a canopy on whose sides the words "Faith," "Hope," "Charity," and "Temperance" are chiseled. Atop this canopy is a life-sized heron, and the centerpiece is a pair of entwined heraldic scaly dolphins. Originally, visitors were supposed to freely drink ice water flowing from the dolphins' snouts with a brass cup attached to the fountain and the overflow was collected by a trough for horses, but the city tired of having to replenish the ice in a reservoir underneath the base and disconnected the supply pipes.

The inscription reads:
(Base of fish:)
PRESENTED BY
DR. HENRY D. COGSWELL
OF SAN FRANCISCO CAL
(Top of temple:)
TEMPERANCE
FAITH
HOPE
CHARITY

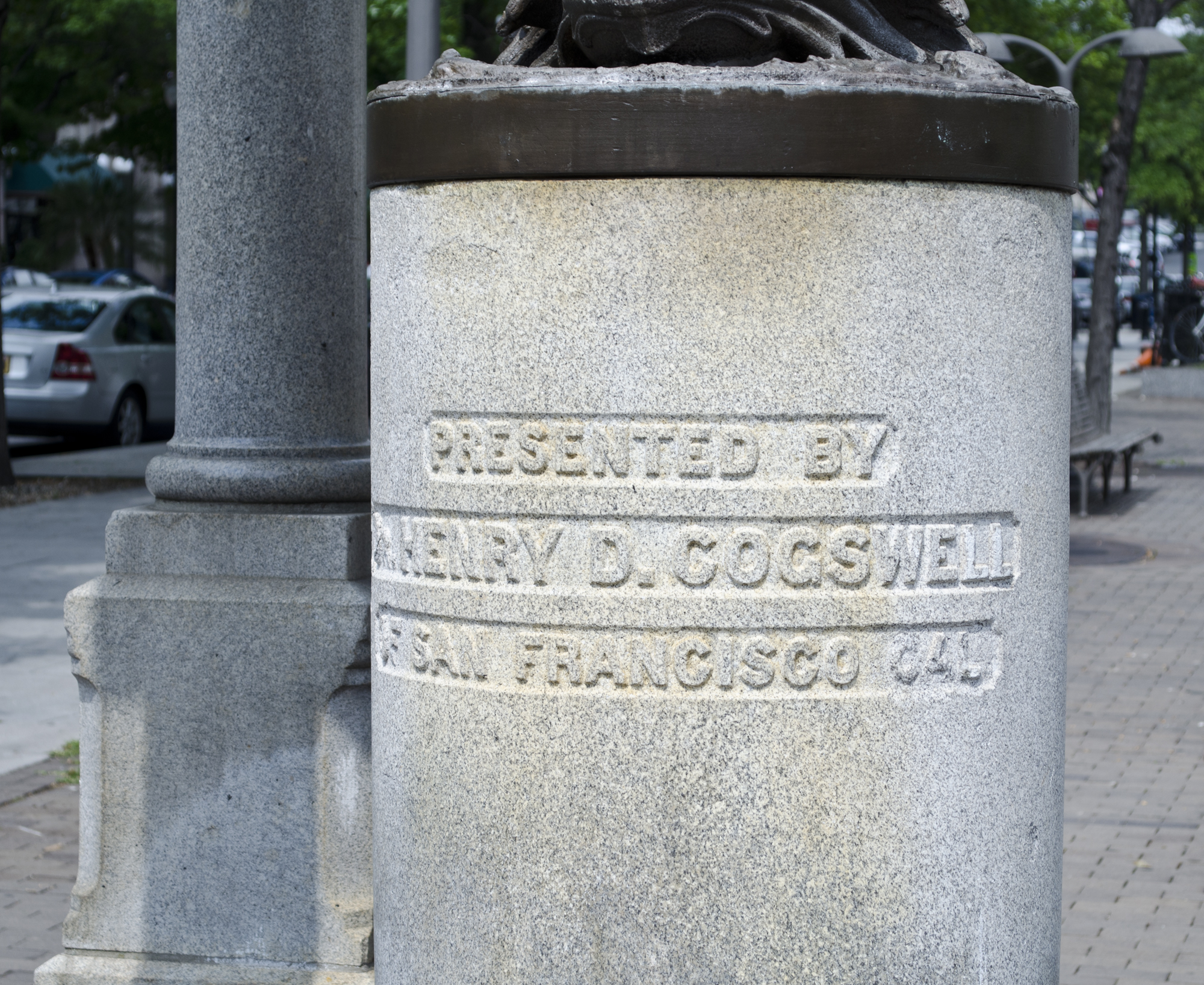
Inscription

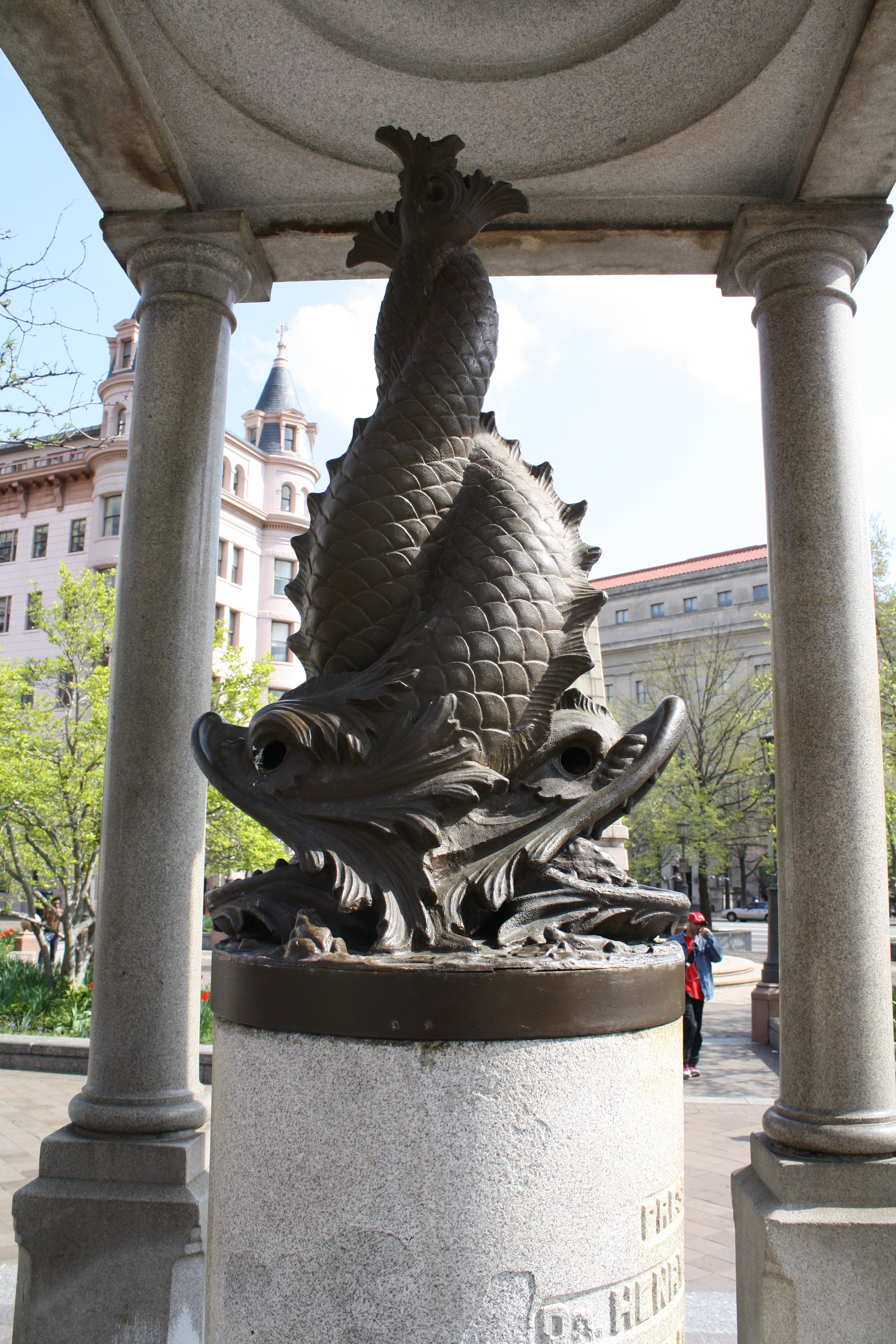
Sculpture of two dolphins inside the enclosure

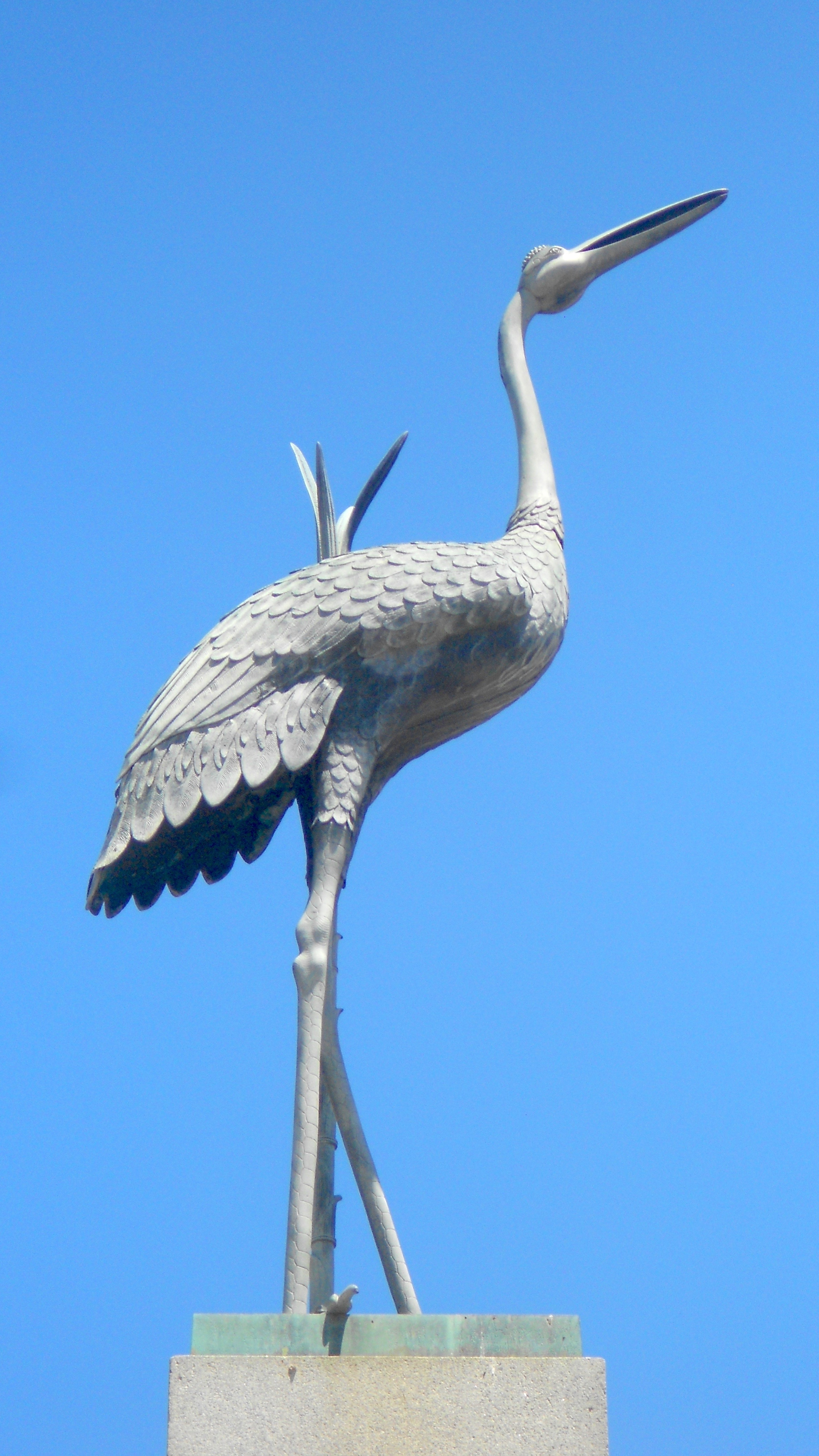
Great Blue Heron atop the fountain

== Location ==
The Temperance Fountain was originally placed at a prominent location: Seventh and Pennsylvania Avenue, across from Center Market and near to "Hooker's Division" (now the Federal Triangle). The message was to drink water, not whiskey, as there were so many saloons along the Avenue to tempt passersby. This was near the halfway point between the Capitol and White House. For many years after National Prohibition, it ironically sat in front of the Apex Liquor Store, which operated in the ground floor of the Central National Bank Building.

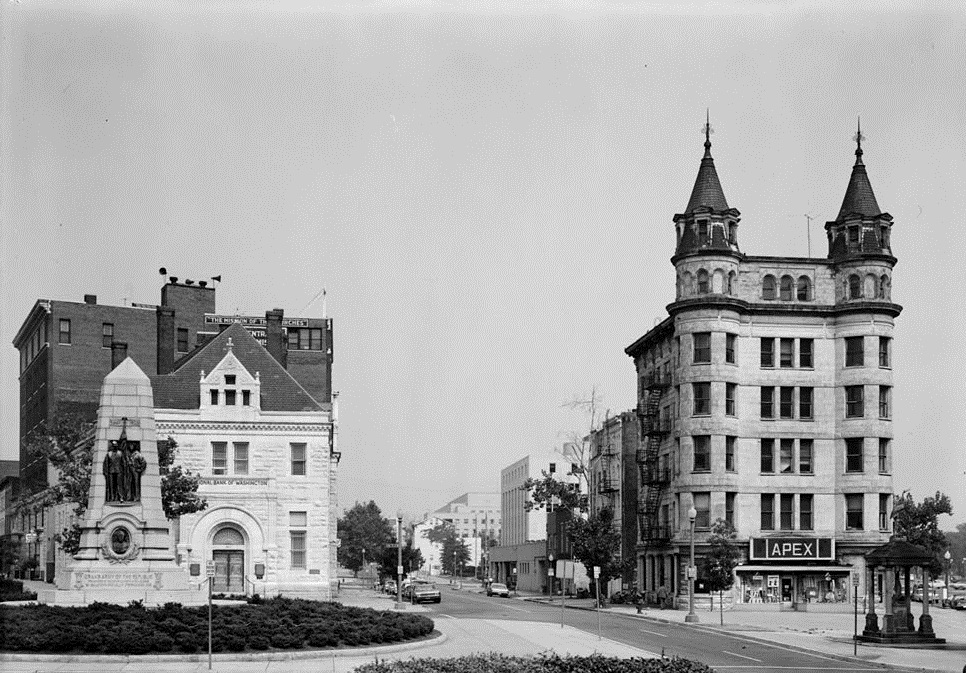
Washington's Temperance Fountain (lower right corner) for years sat in front of the Apex Liquor Store, housed in the Central National Bank Building.

In 1987, it was relocated about 100 feet north during the renewal by the Pennsylvania Avenue Development Corporation, since the statue was regarded as undesirable from the start. The PADC created Indiana Plaza, and the Temperance Fountain swapped locations with the monument to the Grand Army of the Republic, which was considered historically more significant.

Today the fountain sits at the corner of Seventh Street and Indiana Avenue, NW, across from the National Archives and Navy Memorial, where thousands of tourists and workers walk past daily without noticing it. The Temperance Fountain has been called "the city's ugliest statue". NBC correspondent Bryson Rash, writing in Footnote Washington, a 1981 book of capital lore, reported that "these unusual and awkward structures spurred the movement across the country for city fine arts commissions to screen such gifts" prior to funding. In April 1945, Sen. Sheridan Downey of California introduced a Senate resolution to remove the fountain, but, preoccupied with World War II, Congress ignored the resolution and it died in committee.

== Upkeep ==
The fountain is also the source of the name for the Cogswell Society, a small group of Washington professionals who have taken it upon themselves to take care of the fountain. In 1984, it was placed on the Downtown Historic District National Register #84003901.

== Other Cogswell fountains ==
Cogswell's fountains can be found in Washington, D.C., Tompkins Square Park New York City, Washington Square, San Francisco and Rockville, Connecticut. Other examples were erected and then torn down at: Buffalo, Rochester, Boston Common, Fall River, Massachusetts, Pacific Grove, California, and San Francisco (California and Market Streets).

== See also ==
- List of public art in Washington, D.C., Ward 6
- National Register of Historic Places listings in central Washington, D.C.
- Outdoor sculpture in Washington, D.C.
- Drinking fountains in the United States
- Catholic Total Abstinence Union Fountain in Philadelphia
