= Broadway Tower (Portland, Oregon) =

Skyscraper in Portland Oregon

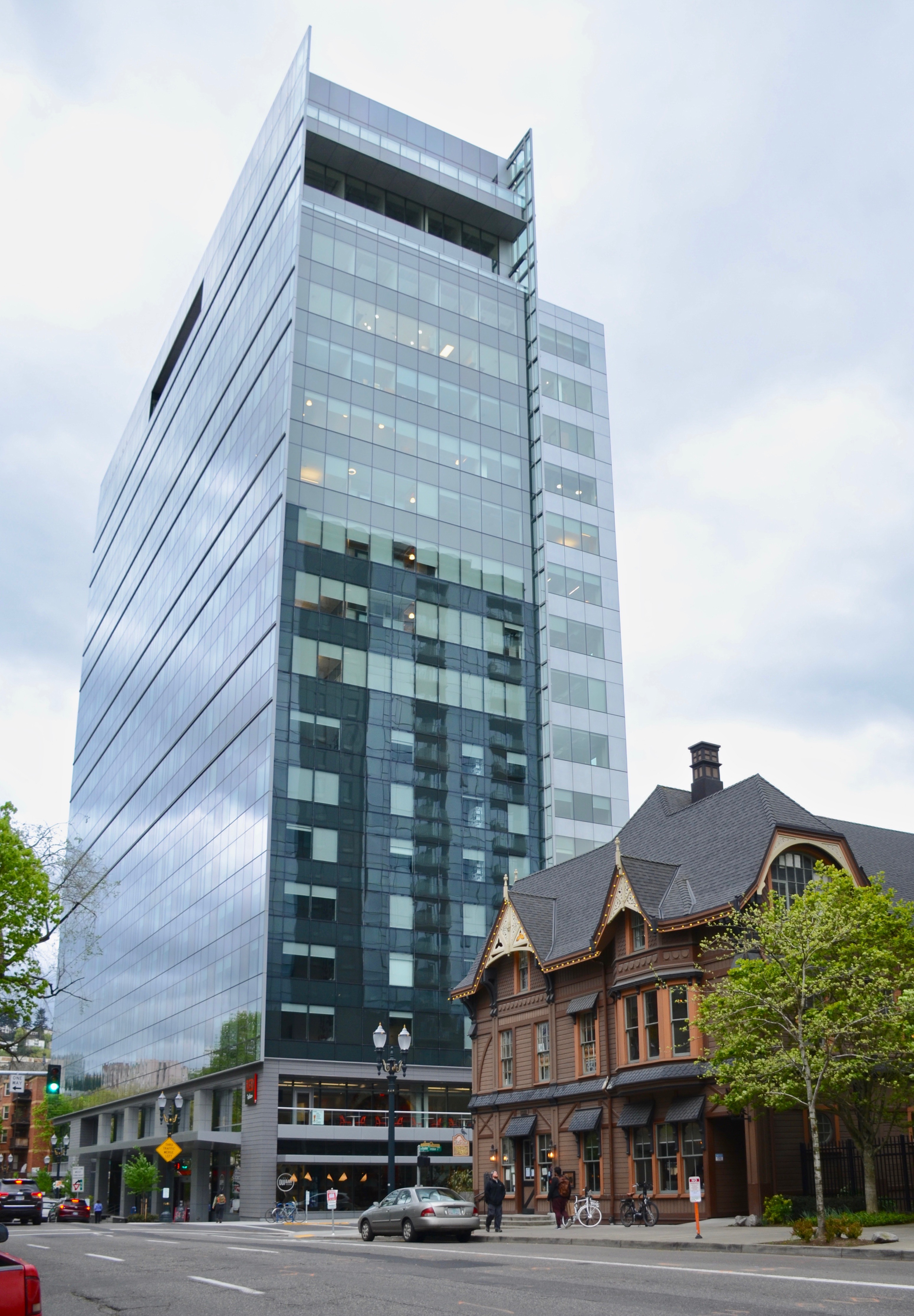
- From the northeast in 2019, with the Ladd Carriage House in the foreground

General information
- Status: Completed
- Type: Hotel, office, retail
- Location: 1455 SW Broadway; Portland, Oregon, United States
- Coordinates: 45°30′52″N 122°40′58″W
- Named for: Broadway
- Construction started: June 2016
- Opened: November 2018

Height
- Architectural: 258 feet (79 m)
- Top floor: 235 feet (72 m)

Design and construction
- Architecture firm: GBD Architects
- Developer: BPM Real Estate Group

Other information
- Number of rooms: 180 hotel rooms
- Parking: 210 parking spaces

The Broadway Tower is a high-rise building in downtown Portland, Oregon, in the United States. The 19-story tower has offices for several companies, as well as a hotel on its lower nine floors. It began construction in 2016 and opened in 2018.

== History ==
Excavation on the Broadway Tower site began in June 2016 and was completed in November. It was developed by BPM Real Estate Group as a mixed-use hotel and office building with 175,000 square feet (16,300 m^{2}) of office space. The building was completed in November 2018.

== Tenants ==
A 180-room hotel occupies the building's first nine floors. The Radisson RED Portland Downtown opened in November 2018. The hotel was then rebranded as Hotel Vance, Portland, a Tribute Portfolio Hotel and reopened in July 2021.

Amazon signed a lease for approximately 85,000 square feet of the building in January 2018.

The law firm Markowitz Herbold occupies the top two floors.

== See also ==
- Beastro (restaurant)
- List of tallest buildings in Portland, Oregon
