= Henry D. Cogswell =

American temperance activist (1820-1900)

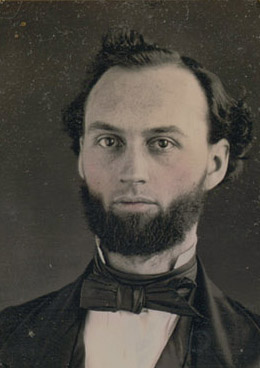
- Henry D. Cogswell, ca. 1850-52
- Born: March 3, 1820; Tolland, Connecticut, US
- Died: July 8, 1900 (aged 80)
- Occupation: Dentist
- Known for: Temperance

Henry Daniel Cogswell (March 3, 1820 – July 8, 1900) was an American dentist and a crusader in the temperance movement. Cogswell and his wife Caroline also founded Cogswell Polytechnical College in San Francisco, California. Another campus in Everett, Washington was later dedicated in his honor.

== Life ==
Born in Tolland, Connecticut, as a youth, he worked in the New England cotton mills and studied by night. At age 26, he became a dentist in Providence, Rhode Island. When the California Gold Rush started, the Cogswell family decided to go west despite not prospecting themselves. Cogswell offered dentistry services to prospectors and invested in real estate and mining stocks, becoming one of San Francisco's first millionaires. A pioneer in his field, he designed the vacuum method of securing dental plates and was the first in California to perform a dental operation using chloroform.

== Philanthropy ==
Temperance fountains by Henry D. Cogswell

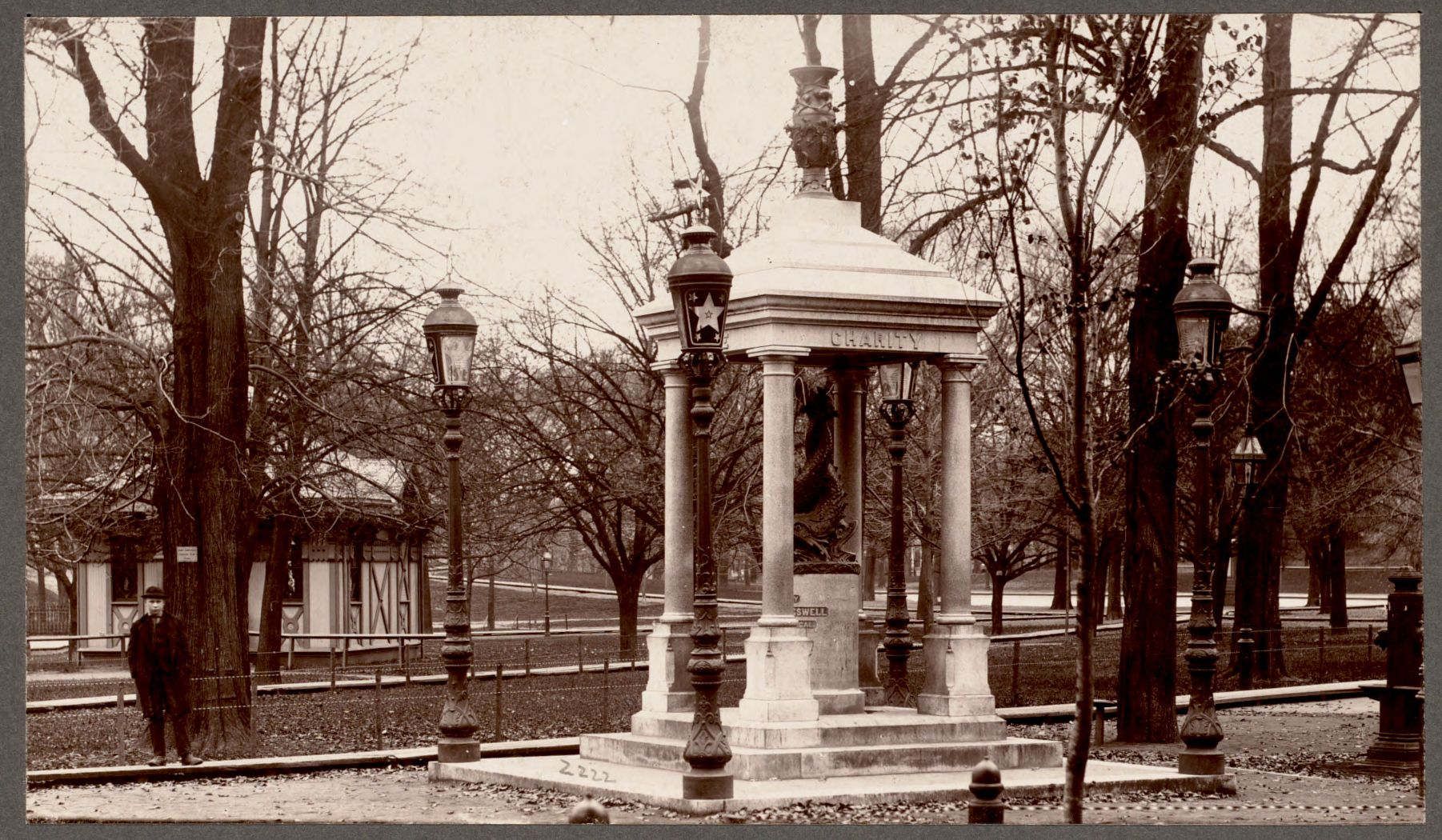
Boston Common, ca. 1890

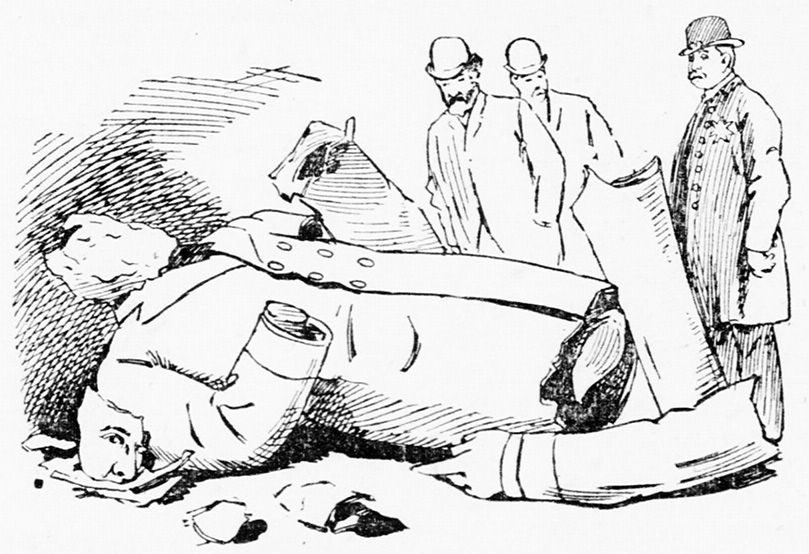
Destruction of Cogswell's fountain in San Francisco, 1894

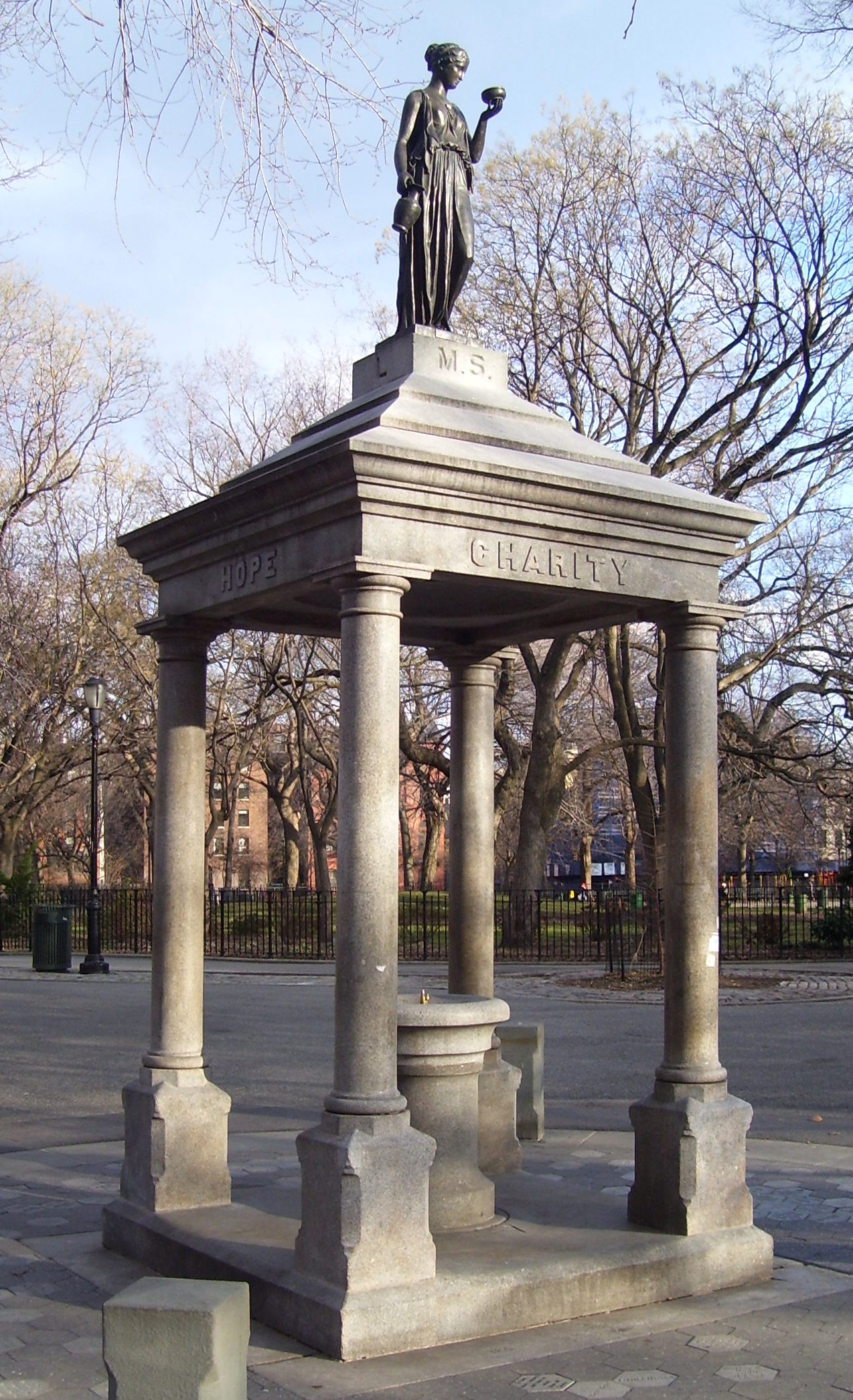
Tompkins Square Park, New York City

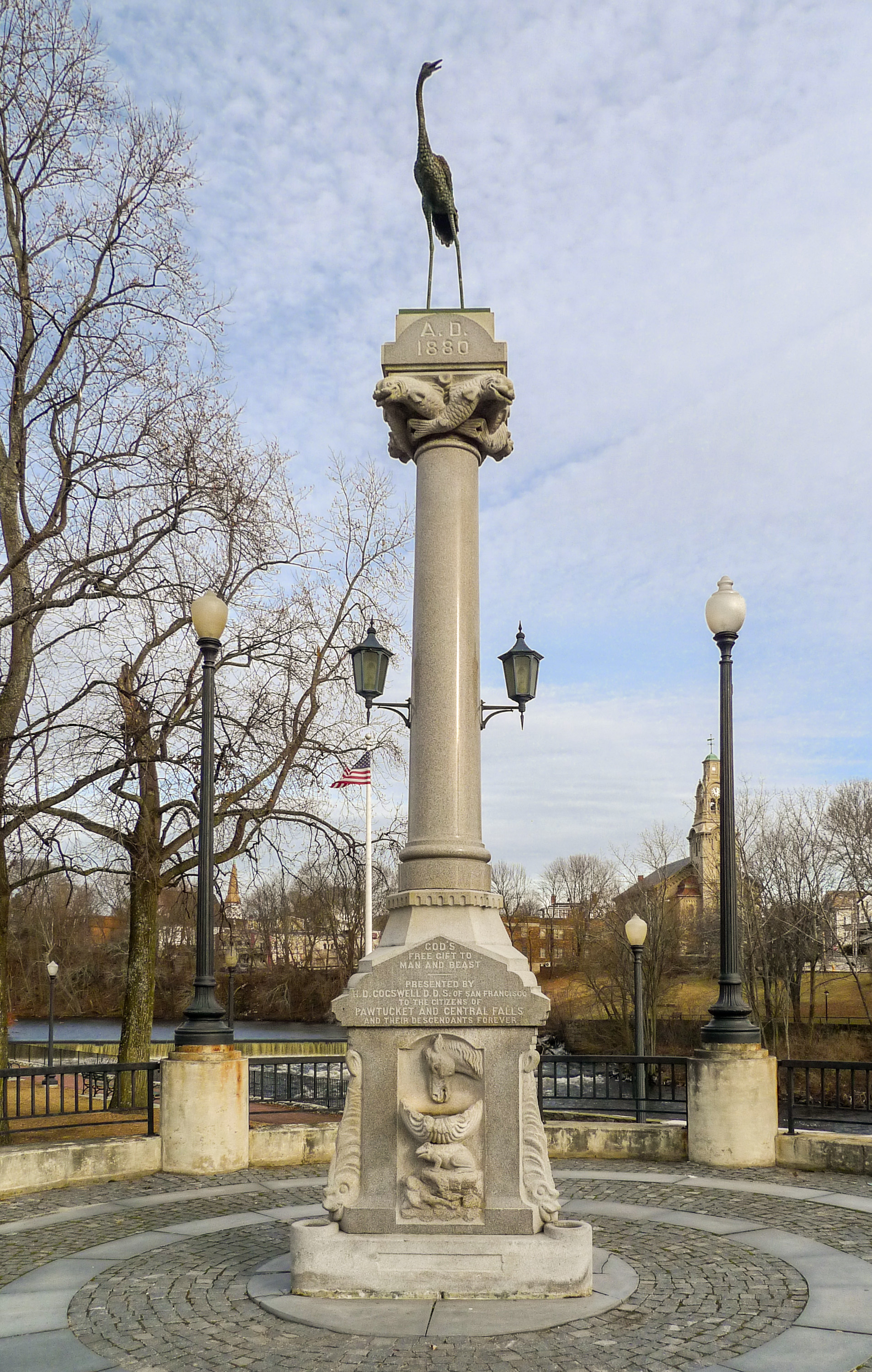
Pawtucket, Rhode Island

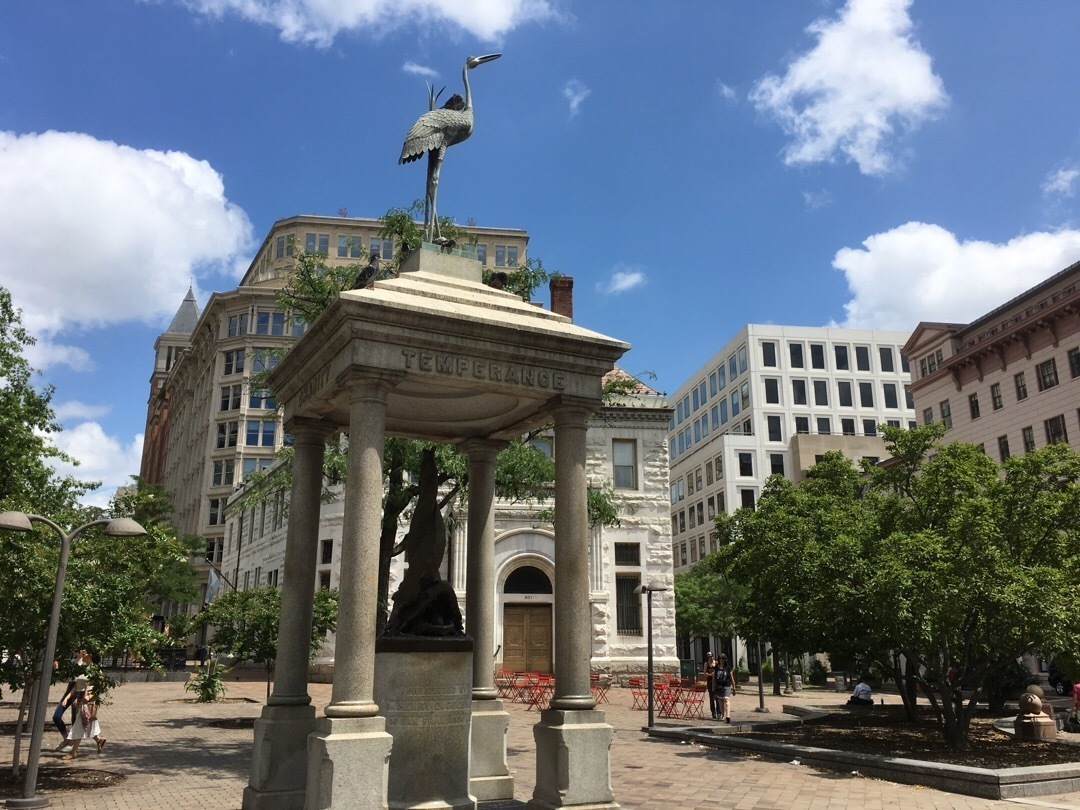
Washington, D.C.

Cogswell believed that people would consume fewer alcoholic beverages if they had access to cool drinking water, so he sought to construct one temperance fountain for every 100 saloons across the United States. Many of these drinking fountains, elaborate structures built of granite that Cogswell designed himself, would be built in the following years.

Cogswell's fountains are found in Washington, D.C., Tompkins Square Park, New York City, Washington Square, San Francisco Pawtucket, Rhode Island, and Rockville, Connecticut. Other examples were erected and then razed at: Buffalo, Rochester, Boston Common, (removed 1900) Fall River, Massachusetts, Pacific Grove, California, San Jose, California, and San Francisco (California and Market Streets). The concept of providing drinking fountains as alternatives to saloons was later implemented by the Women's Christian Temperance Union.

These grandiose statues were not well received by the communities where they were placed. Washington, DC's Temperance Fountain has been called "the city's ugliest statue" and spurred city councils across the country to set up fine arts commissions to screen such gifts. Along with this, many of the fountains were installed incorrectly leading to a hot, high velocity water jet rather than the cool slow stream promised by Cogswell. Many of the fountains were later found to have bacterial contamination and were subsequently shut down.

Although the D.C. statue survived mostly unscathed, the San Francisco one was torn down by "a lynch party of self-professed art lovers" including Gelett Burgess (who was subsequently fired from his job at University of California at Berkeley) and one in Rockville, Connecticut, was thrown into Shenipsic Lake. In Dubuque, Iowa, a statue of Cogswell that sat in Washington Park was pulled down by a group of vandals in 1900 and buried under the ground of a planned sidewalk. The next day the sidewalk was poured and the object was entombed. However, when new sidewalks were laid in the early 2000s, the statue was not found. All surviving fountains have since been disconnected.

== Death and legacy ==
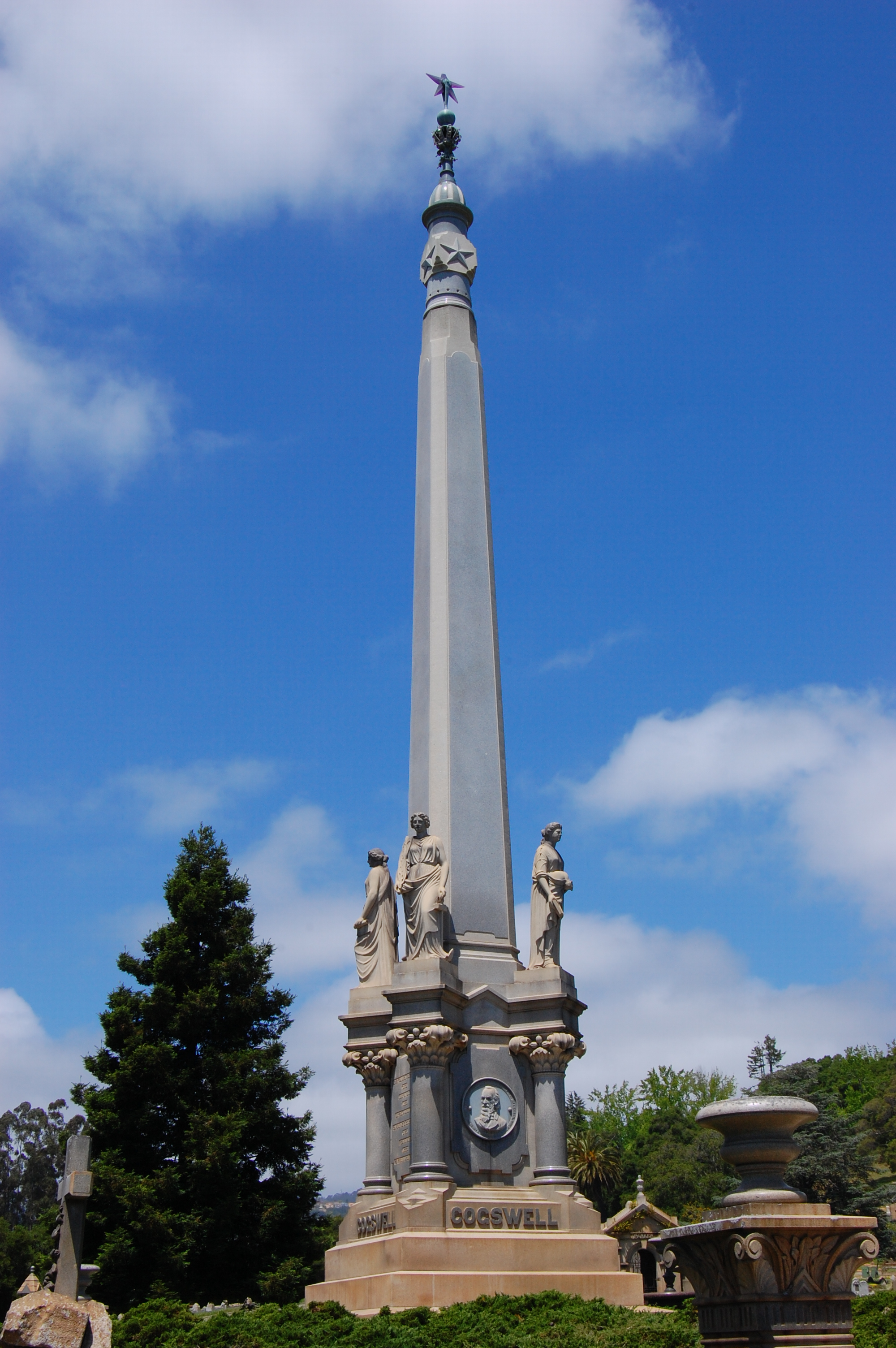
Cogswell's tomb in Oakland

Cogswell also designed the statue for his own tomb, a 400-ton granite tower, complete with fountains and statues of Hope, Faith, Charity and Temperance. He is buried in Mountain View Cemetery in Oakland, California.

The diaries of Cogswell and his wife Caroline cover 37 years (1860–1897). They are a long record of busy personal and financial life in the western United States. They are kept at the Bancroft Library at the University of California, Berkeley.
