= Beastro (restaurant) =

Defunct restaurant in Portland, Oregon, U.S.

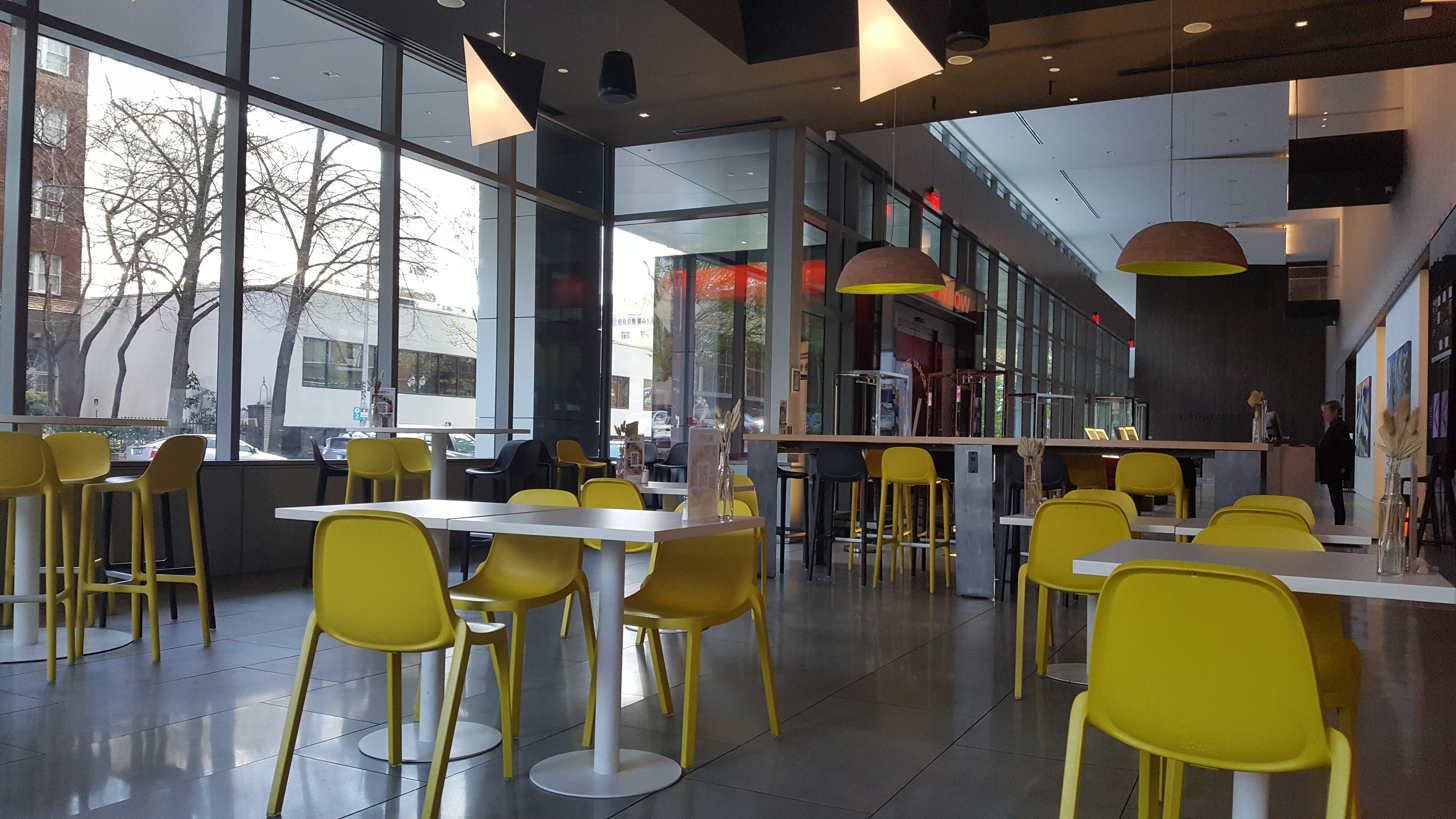
- The restaurant's interior, 2022
- Interactive map of Beastro

Restaurant information
- Established: 2021
- Closed: July 2025
- Food type: Korean
- Location: 1455 Southwest Broadway, Portland, Oregon, 97201, United States
- Coordinates: 45°30′53″N 122°40′57″W
- Website: beastrobymarshawnlynch.com

Beastro by Marshawn Lynch, or simply Beastro, was a Korean restaurant in Portland, Oregon, United States. It operated from 2021 to July 2025.

== History ==
Beastro opened in 2021.

Marshawn Lynch, Jun Park, and Kevin Yamada originally planned to open a Hawaiian restaurant at Hotel Vance called Beast, with recipes by Lynch's Filipino grandmother. However, the proposed name conflicted with Naomi Pomeroy's restaurant of the same name. The name 'Beast by Marshawn Lynch & Kama’aina' was changed to 'Beastro'.

The restaurant closed permanently in July 2025.

== See also ==
- History of Korean Americans in Portland, Oregon
- List of defunct restaurants of the United States
- List of Korean restaurants
