= Hotel Vance, Portland, a Tribute Portfolio Hotel =

Hotel in Portland, Oregon, U.S.

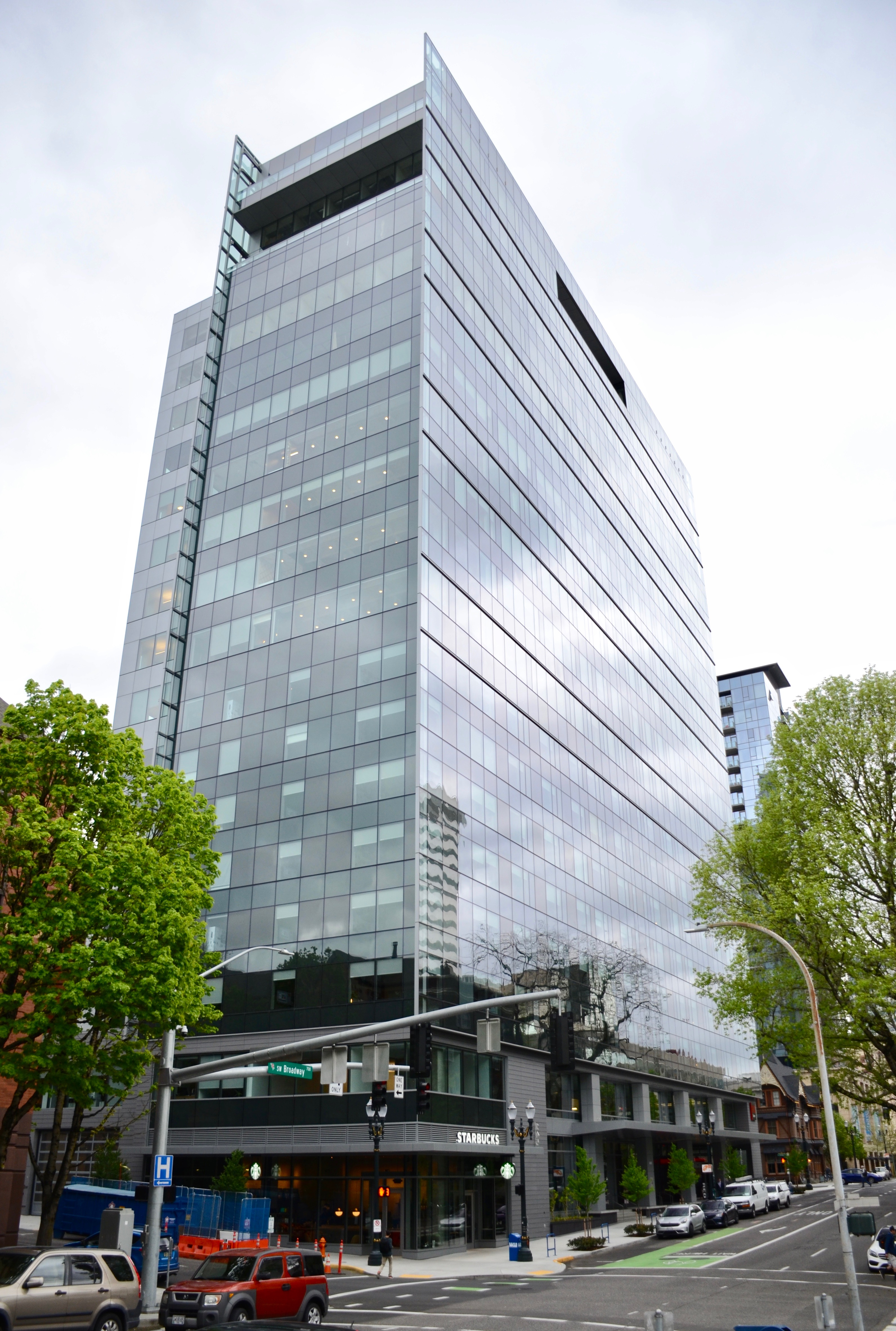
- The hotel is in Portland, Oregon's Broadway Tower (pictured in 2019).
- Interactive map of the Hotel Vance, Portland, a Tribute Portfolio Hotel area

General information
- Location: Portland, Oregon, United States
- Coordinates: 45.5137°N 122.682592°W

The Hotel Vance, Portland, a Tribute Portfolio Hotel is a 180-room Tribute Portfolio hotel in Portland, Oregon's Broadway Tower.

== History ==
The hotel previously operated as Radisson RED Portland Downtown, opening in 2018 as the Radisson Red brand's second location in the United States. Hotel Vance opened on July 15, 2021, after a brand conversion. The restaurant Beastro operated in the building.

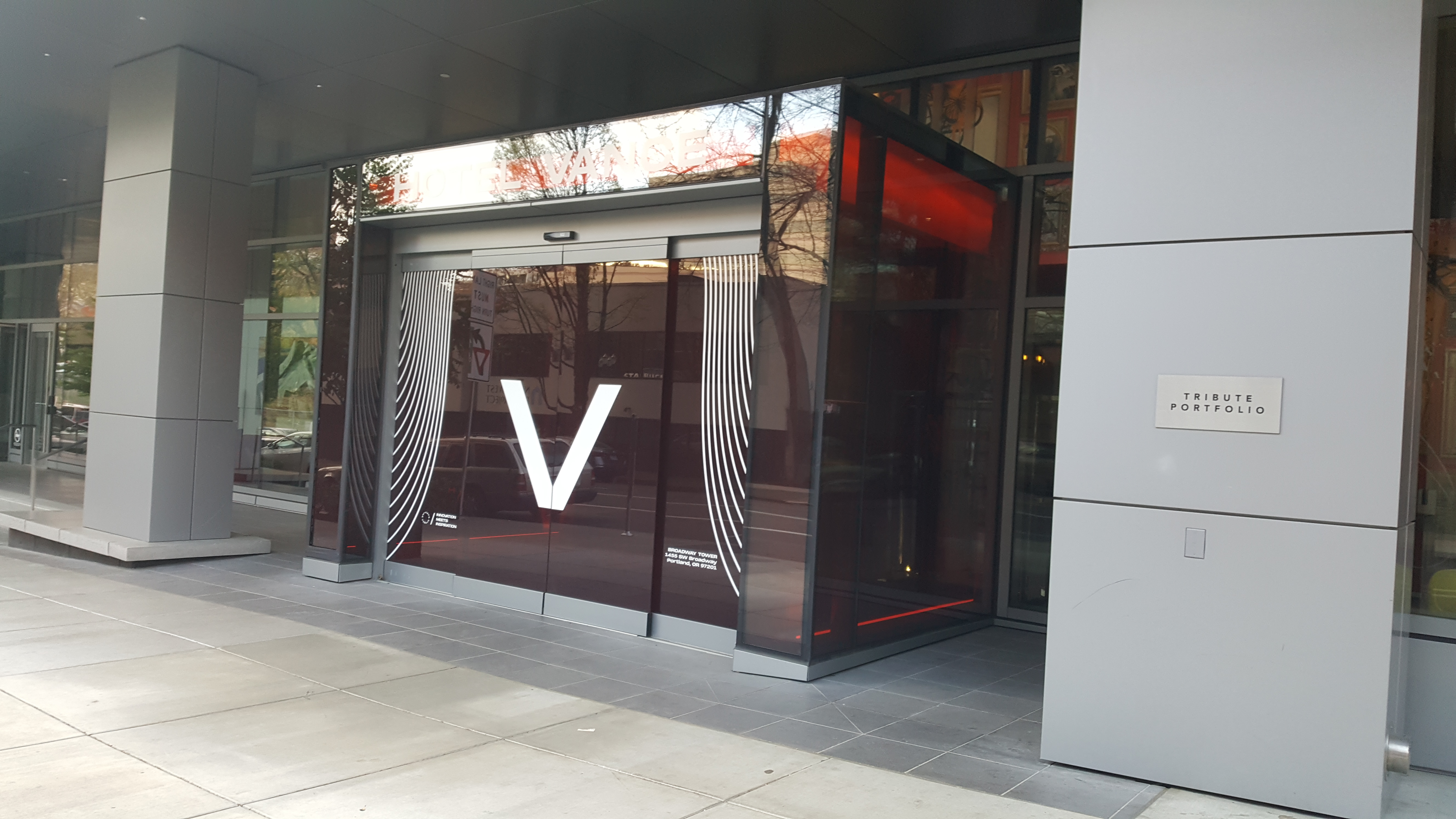
Front entrance, 2022

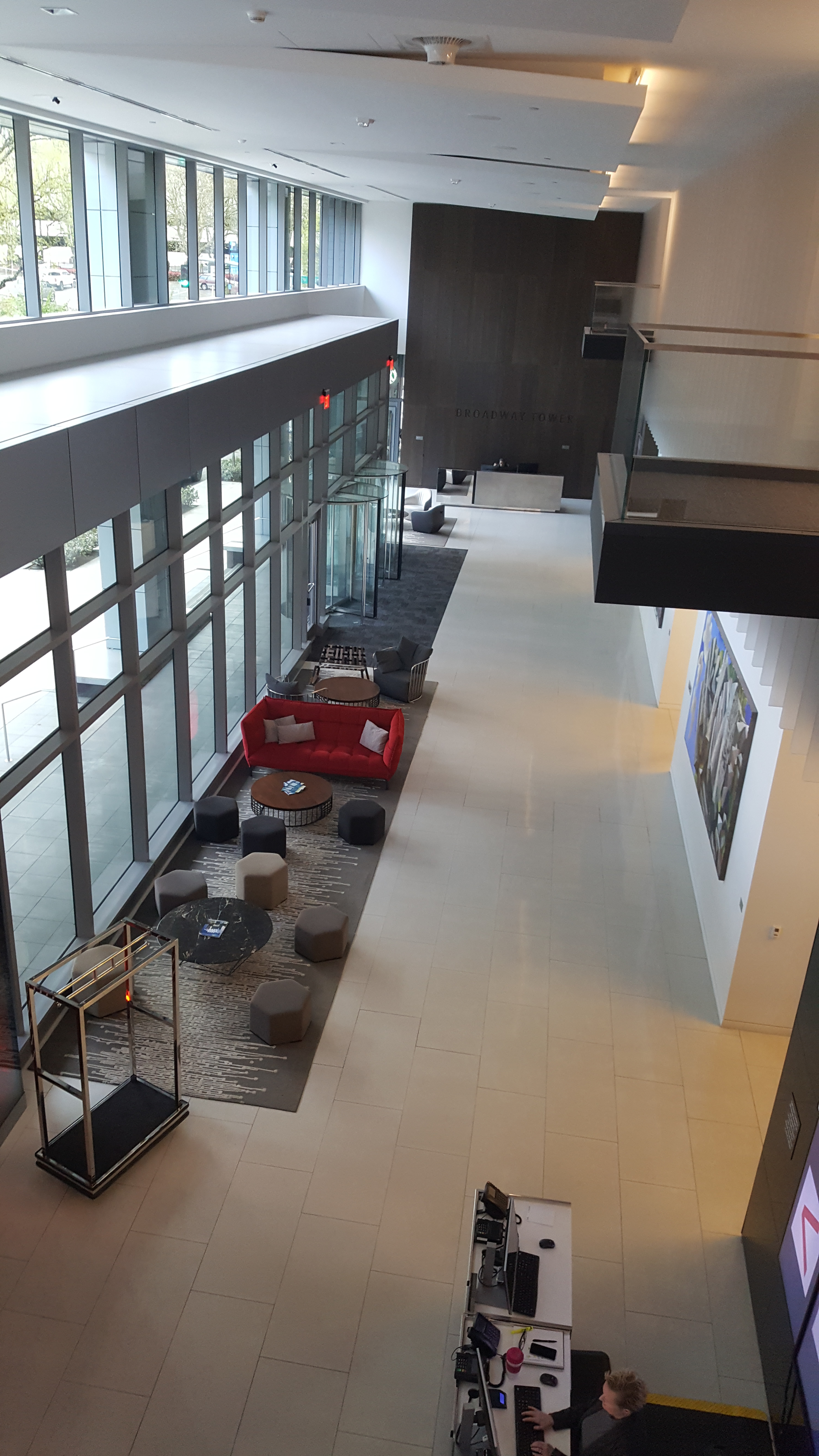
Front desk in the Broadway Tower's lobby

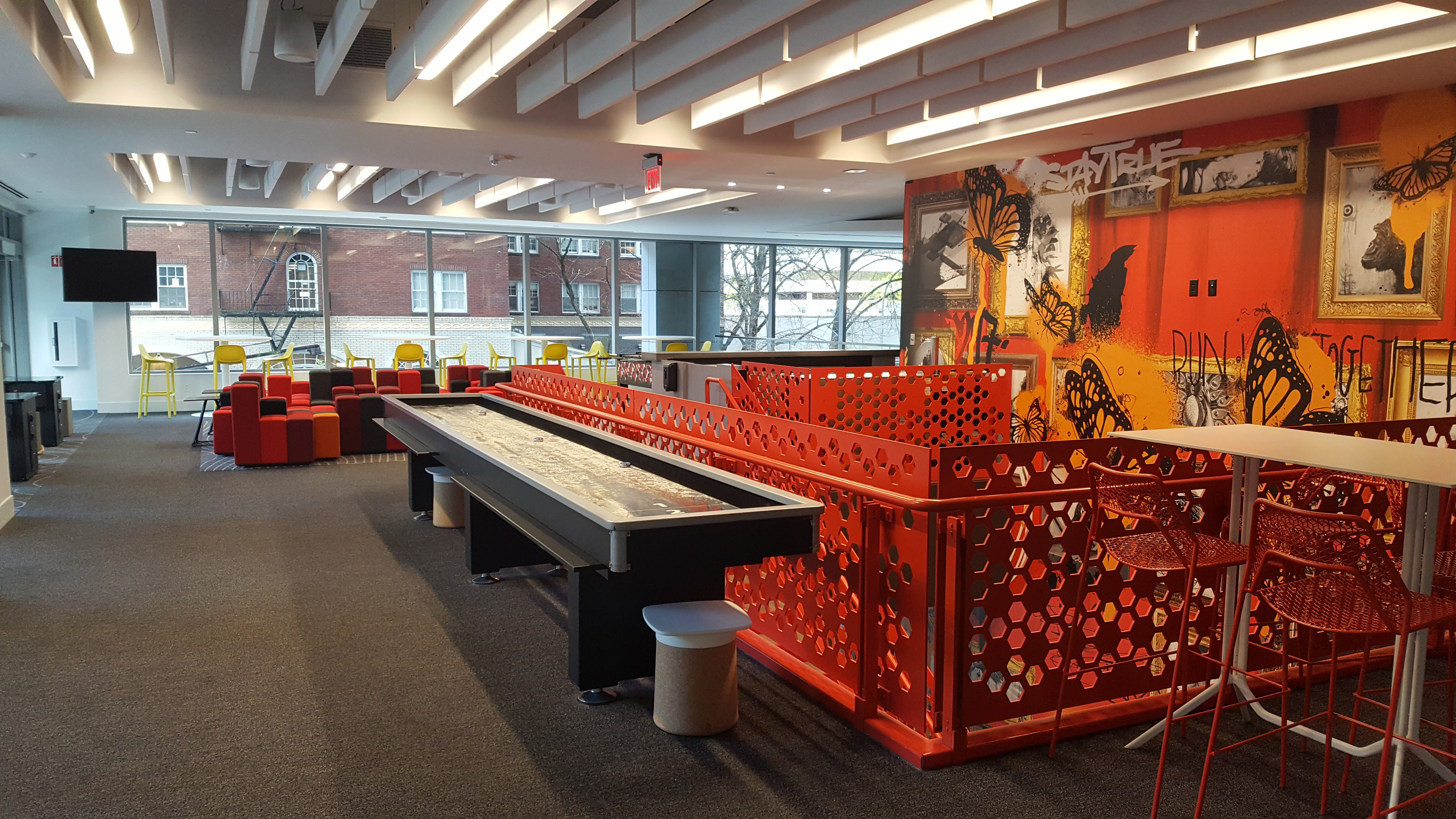
Second level space above Beastro
