= Henry Cogswell College =

Coordinates: 47°38′36″N 122°11′56″W

Henry Cogswell College is a former private institution of higher learning that was based in Washington state from 1979 to 2006. The college offered bachelor's degrees in business administration, computer science, digital arts, electrical engineering, mechanical engineering, mechanical engineering technology, and professional management. It was named after temperance movement crusader Henry D. Cogswell. Historically, the college had an enrollment of 300 students that relied mainly on Boeing-related tuition.

== History ==
Henry Cogswell College was founded in 1979 in Kirkland, Washington as Cogswell College North (at the time, an affiliate of Cogswell College in Sunnyvale, California), largely to provide engineering education to local Boeing employees. The college also operated night and summer classes at Shoreline Community College before permanently moving to south Kirkland.

The college moved to Everett, located near Boeing's largest assembly plant, in 1996, leasing space in a former Bon Marché department store. In 2000, the college moved into the historic Federal Building in downtown Everett, spending $2 million to renovate the 1917-built office building. Off-campus classes were also held at a Boeing facility in the south Puget Sound (about 30 miles from Everett) to accommodate students living in that area. Limited classes continued to be offered at the Boeing facility even after the main campus moved to Everett. The institution closed on September 1, 2006, due to a decline in enrollment and substantial deficit.
