= Billy the Axeman =

Unidentified American serial killer

- Other names: Ax-Man; Midwest Axeman; Man from the Train
- Capture status: Not captured

Details
- Victims: 24–30 (classic theory); 94 (revised theory)
- Date: 1911–1912 (classic theory); 1898–1912 (revised theory)
- Country: United States
- Weapon: Axe

Billy the Axeman (also referred to as the Ax-Man, the Midwest Axeman, and the Man from the Train) was the name of a suspected serial killer thought to be responsible for a series of family murders that occurred mainly in the U.S. Midwest between September 1911 and June 1912.

Attacks attributed to this killer are characterized by the slaying of a whole family in their beds by crushing their skulls with a blunt instrument, usually an axe. The families often lived in very close proximity to the railroad, which is assumed to be what the killer used for transportation. Possible signature characteristics include the destruction and covering of the victim's faces and the staging of one of the female victims in a manner that indicated lust murder.

The notion of such a killer was first introduced by the press in 1911, and over the past 100 years, many different theories have been advanced. Most theories focus on a series of crimes, which ranged from 1911 to 1912 and claimed between 24 and 30 victims depending on the crimes included. More recently the authors Bill James and Rachel McCarthy James published The Man from the Train, in which they argue for a much longer crime series spanning from 1898 to 1912. This revised theory attributes over 90 deaths to him, which would make him one of the most prolific serial killers in US history.

== History ==
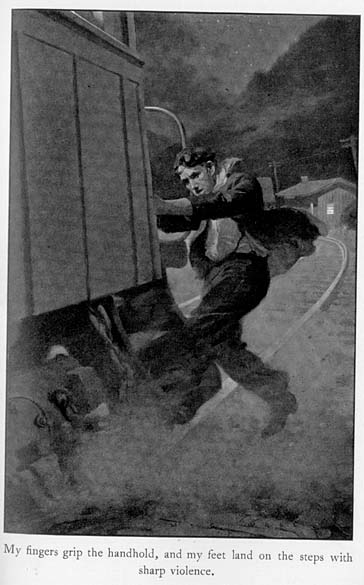
The killer is assumed to have used train hopping to approach and flee a crime scene.

The idea that a roaming killer was behind a series of axe murders in the American Midwest was first introduced by the press in 1911, calling him Billy the Axeman. At the time, people noticed similarities like the use of an axe, the attack on whole families and the closeness of many sites to the railway. Many press articles and a number of law enforcement officers therefore considered the possibility that a single killer was responsible for a series of crimes across the Midwest.

The idea of such a killer was then used by Matthew Wilson McClaughry, a Special Agent of the Department of Justice, to connect the axe murders committed by Henry Lee Moore in 1912 with this series. This attempt proved ultimately unsuccessful and no one was ever prosecuted for more than one of the crimes in the series. However, the idea of such a serial killer remained popular with true crime authors, bloggers, and podcasters.

In 2015, author Todd Elliott substantially expanded the scope of possible murders. He initially focused on a series of axe murders that also took place between 1911 and 1912, but happened in the southern states of Texas and Louisiana. He noticed a number of similarities, such as whole families were killed in the middle of the night, typically by blows with the blunt side of an axe, and many crimes scenes being in close proximity to railroads. He concluded that the same person must have been behind them. One difference of the southern series was that almost exclusively black and mixed race families were targeted.

In 2017, authors Bill James and Rachel McCarthy James published The Man from the Train, in which they further expanded this original idea. They propose that more murders should be expected given that even the earliest crimes that are usually considered already show a mature modus operandi, suggesting an experienced serial killer behind them. They claim that the murder series extends much farther back in time, and also present a suspect which had not been discussed before.

== Identifying characteristics ==
Axes were regular household tools in the early 1900s and a substantial number of murders were committed with this weapon. To distinguish crimes connected with the Midwest murder series from other axe murders, different authors have developed a list of characteristics that detail the modus operandi and possible signatures, and therefore point toward a single individual being behind them. The first to systematically describe such a set of similarities was Beth Klingensmith.

According to Klingensmith, the murders were typically committed on a Sunday night in a small town. The murderer would use train hopping to quickly approach the town. Once there, he would pick a house that met certain criteria, observe it and wait until the people inside would be fast asleep. The murder weapon, typically an axe, was always a weapon of opportunity taken either from the house or a neighboring premise. He would typically enter the house through an unlocked door or a rear window, by removing the screen and placing it against the wall. Once inside, he would use a lamp from the house to illuminate the crime scene. He would remove the chimney from the lamp, carefully place it (to avoid tripping over it), and bent the wick down. During the commission of the murders, the victims' faces were covered, possibly to reduce blood splatter. He committed the murders by smashing the victims' heads with the blunt side of the axe. The killings were done quickly. After the murders, the perpetrator remained at the crime scene, washed his hands, covered the windows, moved the bodies, staged them, mutilated them further and often covered them additionally. Both during and after the killing, he attacked only the heads and faces of the victims, leaving the rest of the body unharmed. When he left the crime scene, he cleaned the murder weapon of fingerprints, left it at the scene and jammed the house before leaving. He fled the town the same way he had come, jumping onto a carriage of a train that was passing by the nearby railway line.

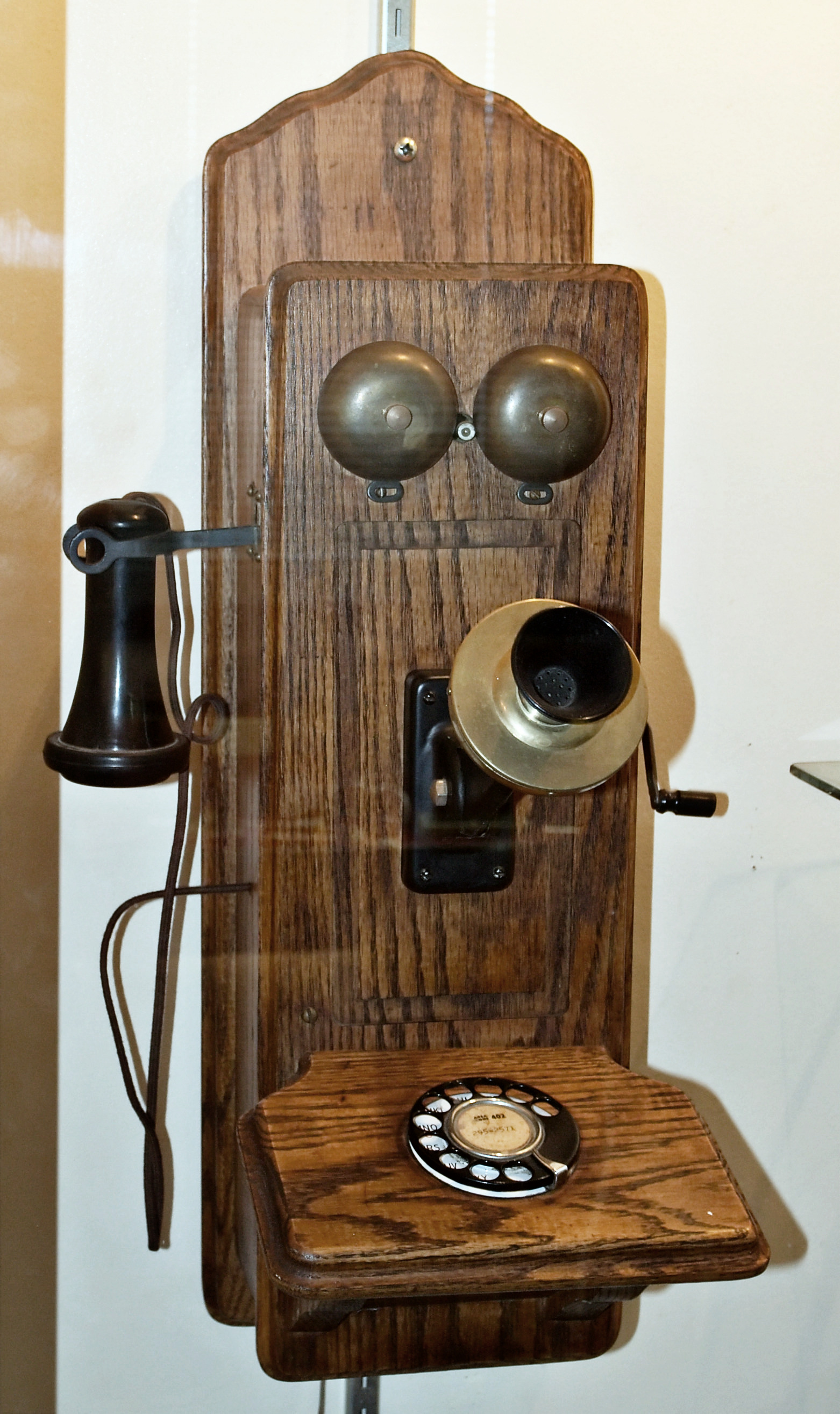
The killer covered the victim's faces, as well as mirrors and telephones, which led to speculation that an aversion to being looked at may be a signature element.

Bill James and Rachel McCarthy James use the same basic structure but make a number of revisions. Unlike Beth Klingensmith, they also try to infer a number of signature elements that may reveal an underlying motivation of the crimes. First, they observe how often one of the female victims, typically a prepubescent girl, would be found pulled down toward the end of the bed and exposed in a sexually explicit manner. Although newspapers at the time avoided details, they often strongly implied that some form of assault on the victim had taken place after death. The crimes contain both necrophilic and pedophilic signature elements. In addition, the authors note a possible aversion of the killer to human faces. This is indicated by the killer often additionally targeting the victim's faces after the murders, covering their faces, covering mirrors, as well as covering telephones, which in the 1910s often had starkly human features. The authors observe a difference between the later crime series of 1909–1912 and the earlier crime series of 1900–1906. In the later crime series, the murders occurred in small towns and the houses were jammed shut after the murder. In the earlier crime series, on the other hand, most of the murders occurred in remote farmsteads, and the murderer burned the house down. The authors also proposed a different selection process by the murderer. In the early series, they suspect he would settle in a place for a while, get employment in a logging or mining business and carefully scout the area around his place of employment for potential attack sites. He would then commit his murders after his temporary contract would run out. In the later series, in particular during the Midwest series, he would simply hop off the train, walk into a small town and select a house after observing it shortly. They note a number of additional similarities. One is the proximity of many of the crime scenes to logging and mining operations, where someone experienced with handling an axe or pickaxe could find work. Another is the lack of a financial motive. The victims were either very poor, or if they were not, valuables were often left at the scene of the crime in plain sight. The murders were often committed in relative proximity to each other a few weeks apart. They note that murders that fit his modus operandi would occur in the northern states in summer and in southern states in the winter.

In addition, several authors have tried to infer personal characteristics of the killer. Some have suggested that the killer could not have been tall given he was able to swing an axe in often very confined in-door spaces. This notion is further substantiated by the detection of foot prints of size six at one crime scene. Analyzing the attack patterns, it has furthermore been claimed that the killer may have been left handed. Aaron Mahnke of the Lore podcast has also speculated whether the killer had wiped his fingerprints due to them being on record from a previous incarceration.

== Classic theory ==
Both back in the 1910s and in later publications, the number of crimes that are considered to be committed by the same axe murderer does vary. However, a series of six family murders that happened on five different occasion between September 1911 and June 1912 in the Midwest are always discussed within the context of these killings. Depending on the author, other murders preceding or following this series are sometimes included as well.

Timeline of the axe murders associated with the Northwestern and Midwestern crimes. Murders are marked with black marks. Inferred ranges of the murder period in the Northwest and Midwest are given as blue and green bars, respectively.

=== Early Northwestern murders ===
The two family murders that are most often also included happened in the summer of 1911 in Ardenwald, Oregon and Rainier, Washington. These Northwestern crimes preceded the main Midwestern series by two months. Back then, the press did connect these crimes with the Midwestern series but W. M. McClaughry later excluded them from his theory. Modern authors have likewise come to different conclusions with some arguing for a connection and others being skeptical.

==== Ardenwald ====
The Hill family murders happened on the night of June 9 to 10, 1911, in Ardenwald, Oregon. The victims were William Hill, 31, his wife Ruth Hill, 33, and his wife's two children from a previous marriage, Philip Rintoul, 8, and Dorothy Rintoul, 6. They were killed in their beds with blows to their heads. The murder weapon, an axe, was found at the crime scene. The murders were assumed to have happened shortly after midnight based on a neighbor's dog barking around that time. The bodies of the dead were moved and covered after the crime. Dorothy and her mother Ruth had both been sexually assaulted after the killing. Dorothy had bloody fingerprints on her body and Ruth's body had been pulled down toward the end of the bed. The killer had washed at the crime scene and covered the windows with cloth.

The crime was discovered the next morning by a neighbor when William Hill did not report for work that day. There were a number of suspects in the case. One of them, their neighbor Nathan Harvey, was charged with the crime in 1912 but ultimately acquitted.

==== Rainier ====
The Coble family murders happened on the night of July 9 to 10, 1911, in Rainier, Washington. The victims were Archie Coble, 28, and his wife Nettie Coble, 18. They lived in a small house somewhat outside the town. Mr. Coble worked as a clerk at a store in Rainier and used the nearby railroad tracks to walk to work.

They were murdered in their beds with blows to their heads with the blunt side of an axe. The killer had covered the face of Archie Coble after the murders. Nettie Coble had been pulled down toward the end of the bed and assaulted after death. Blood was found on the chimney of the oil lamp, suggesting the killer had handled it. However, it had not been removed. Due to the similarities, the press did connect the two murders at the time. Several suspects were investigated. One was a Swedish immigrant who worked on the nearby railroad. Another one was his foreman at work, a man named George Wilson. Both implicated themselves during interrogation. Eventually, Wilson was convicted for the crime but doubts about his guilt remain.

=== Main Midwestern murder series ===
The main series of crimes happened in the American Midwest and lasted from September 1911 to June 1912. It started in Colorado Springs, Colorado with two families, the Burnham and Wayne families, murdered in the same night. It continued a few weeks later with the killing of the Dawson family in Monmouth, Illinois. Only a few weeks later, the Showman family was killed in Ellsworth, Kansas. After this, the series stopped during the winter. It resumed in the summer of 1912 with two family murders. In June, 1912, the Hudson family was slain in Paola, Kansas. A few days later, the Moore family and two visiting girls (sisters) were murdered in Villisca, Iowa.

With the exception of Colorado Springs, which had just under 30,000 inhabitants in 1911, all the towns were smaller but well connected to the railway network of the time. They were all located on major railway lines or at the intersection of at least two lines. In Colorado Springs, Ellsworth and Paola, the crime scene was directly next to the railway, whereas in Monmouth and Villisca, it was a couple of blocks away.

==== Colorado Springs ====
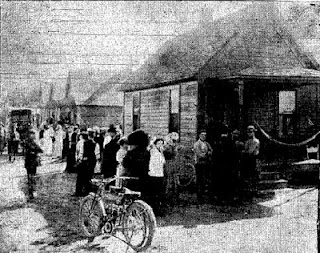
House of the Burnham family with a crowd of onlookers on the day after the murders were discovered.

The first two family murders of the main series happened both during the night from September 17 to 18, 1911, in Colorado Springs, Colorado. The victims were the Burnham family, consisting of May Alice Burnham, 35, and her two children Nellie, 7, and John, 2, as well as the Wayne family, consisting of Henry F. Wayne, 24, his wife Blanche Wayne, 22, and their eighteen-month-old daughter Lula. Both families had come to Colorado Springs to visit the local Modern Woodmen Sanatorium run by the Modern Woodmen of America. While the men were typically staying at the sanatorium, their families lived some distance away in cottage-style houses.

The murders were only discovered on the morning of September 20. In both cases, all the victims had their skulls smashed in with the blunt side of an axe and their faces were covered with bed sheets. The murder weapon itself was taken from one of the houses and left at the crime scene. Both houses had their windows covered and they had been jammed shut by the murderer before leaving. The killer had stayed at the crime scenes, washed his hands and cleaned the murder weapon of fingerprints. Both houses were right next to each other and only a few houses away from the railway line.

A robbery could be ruled out as a motive, as nothing valuable had been taken from either house. A personal motive could not be established either, as neither family had any known enemies in the town, where they had come to visit the local sanatorium only a few weeks earlier. Initial suspicion fell on Mr. Burnham, the only surviving member of the Burnham family. However, it was quickly established that he had spent the night in the sanatorium and could not have committed the crimes as he was seriously ill with tuberculosis.

==== Monmouth ====
The next family murder happened on the night from September 30 to October 1, 1911, in Monmouth, Illinois. The victims were William Dawson, 56, his wife Charity, 52, and their teenage daughter Georgia, 12. They lived south of the railroad tracks in a neighborhood of Monmouth referred to as the "colored" part of town. The Dawsons themselves, however, were white. The father, William Dawson, worked as a janitor at the local First Presbyterian Church.

The crime was discovered by members of his church congregation who went looking for him when he did not show up on Sunday morning to open the church as usual. They found all three family members in their beds, beaten to death with a blunt object. According to reports, the killer had covered the windows, covered the victims after death as well as pulled Georgia Dawson down the bed and staged her.

Initially, the murder weapon was believed to be an axe. However, authorities concluded that a gas pipe, which was found by blood hounds who followed the trail of the killer to a pond near a rail road, was the likely murder weapon. In addition, a pocket flashlight was found several weeks later, when a fence was removed that stood along the path the blood hounds had identified earlier. It had some writing being carved into it, containing the words "Loving", "Lovey" or a variant thereof, as well as the place name "Colorado Springs" and the date "Sept. 4, '11". This was connected by the press to the earlier murders in Colorado Springs. Authorities focused on revenge as a possible motive. Eventually two men, John Wesley Knight and Lovey Mitchell, were charged. This was based on a possible reading of the inscription on the flashlight as well as witness testimony. While Lovey Mitchell was ultimately acquitted after a series of trials, John Wesley Knight was sentenced to 19 years in prison.

==== Ellsworth ====
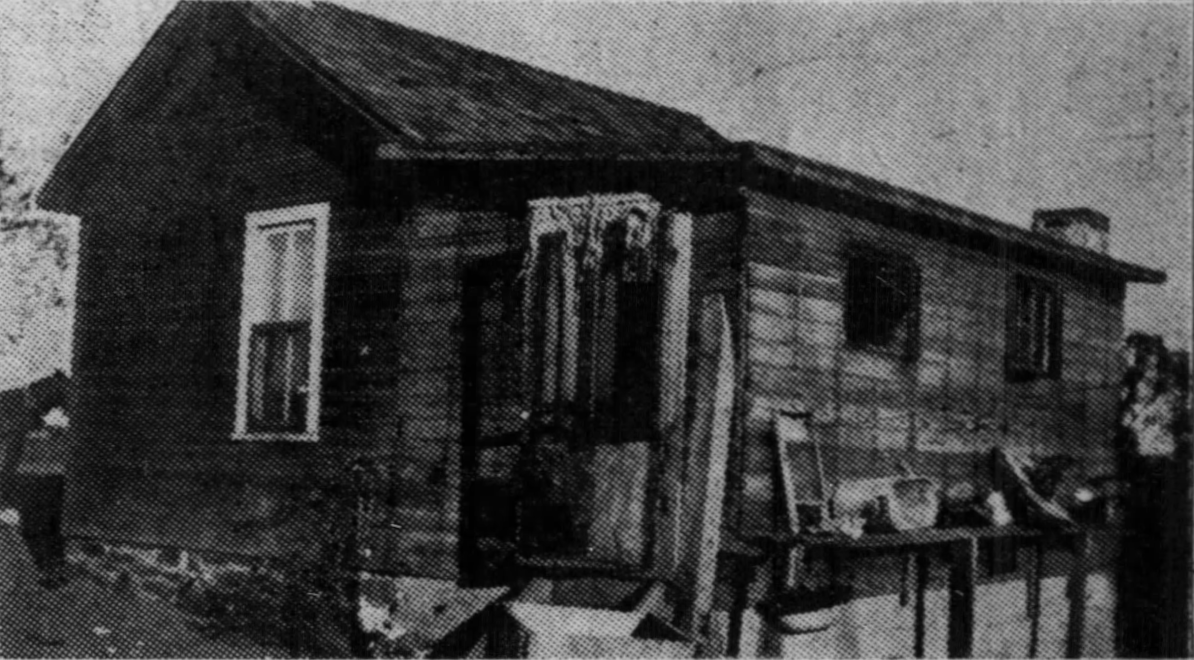
House of the Showman family in the days after murder.

The Showman murders happened during the night from October 15 to 16, 1911, in Ellsworth, Kansas. The victims were William Showman, 31, his wife Pauline Showman, 26, and their three children Lester, 6, Fern, 4, and Fenton, 1. Will Showman worked as a chauffeur in Ellsworth.

The victims were discovered in the afternoon of October 16. All five had their heads crushed with the blunt side of an axe. The family lived in a small cabin in very close proximity to a rail way. The killer had covered all the windows as well as the telephone. Nothing seemed to have been taken from the house. The body of Pauline Showman had been staged after death in a sexually explicit manner. The police found the murder weapon at the site of the crime, which was cleaned of fingerprints. They also found a lamp which had its chimney removed. The chimney was found under a chair in the kitchen. Bloodhounds followed a trail to a nearby intersection of two railway lines.

In addition to these murders, there was an attempted break-in into the home of the city marshal Morris Merritt. In the morning, he discovered that someone had removed the screen from his window and tried to pry it open. His house was directly next to the railroad and only two houses away from the house of the Showman family.

This murder was the first time the press began to connect the different crimes and labeled the suspected killer as Billy the Axman. Police, however, focused again on local suspects. One was Charles Marzyck, the former brother in law of Pauline Showman, who had made threats against the family. Police were able to apprehend Marzyck, but let him go after checking his alibi. Another suspect was a man named John Smith or John Smitherton, who had stayed at a local hotel during the night after the murders and left behind a bundle of clothes. Police were able to find him as well. He was, however, let go after providing a lengthy interview to the police. In the interview, he said that he found the bundle of clothes near the rail lines when he got off the train on the evening of the murders. Bill James and Rachel McCarthy James speculate whether he had found the escape clothes of the actual murderer.

==== Paola ====
The Hudson murders happened on the night of June 5 to 6, 1912, in Paola, Kansas. The victims were Rollin Hudson, 21, and his wife Anna, 22. The couple had only moved to Paola in spring 1912 and reports state that the couple had marital problems due to Anna Hudson's perceived infidelity. They had initially lived with another family but soon moved into a house of their own.

The murders were discovered the next day when, prompted by the absence of Mr. Hudson from work a number of women forced their way into the Hudson's home and discovered the bodies of Rollin and Anna Hudson. The murderer had entered the house through a rear window by first removing its screen and putting it against the house. Inside, he lit a coal lamp, removed its chimney and placed it beneath the bed. He killed both occupants by crushing their skulls and covered their bodies afterwards. The murder weapon was never found but inferred to be a blunt instrument, possibly a pick axe or hammer. Nothing of value was taken, discounting robbery as a motive.

In the same night, another attempted attack was reported in the home of the Longmeyer family, which lived a few houses up in the same street. In that case, the attacker had also entered the house through a rear window by removing its screen and placing it against the wall. Inside the house, he had likewise lit an oil lamp and removed its chimney. The attack was, however, interrupted when Mrs. Longmeyer woke up to the sound of breaking glass. This in turn caused the attacker to flee the house. The broken glass turned out to be the chimney of the lamp. Both the house of the Hudson and of the Longmeyer family were only a few minutes walk away from the intersection of two rail lines.

Despite this second attempt, the public soon focused on the alleged infidelity of Anna Hudson suspecting local suitors as responsible for the murders. The Sheriff, however, did connect the murder with the earlier killings citing the similarities in the MO and apparent sophistication of the killer. No person was ever charged with the crime.

==== Villisca ====
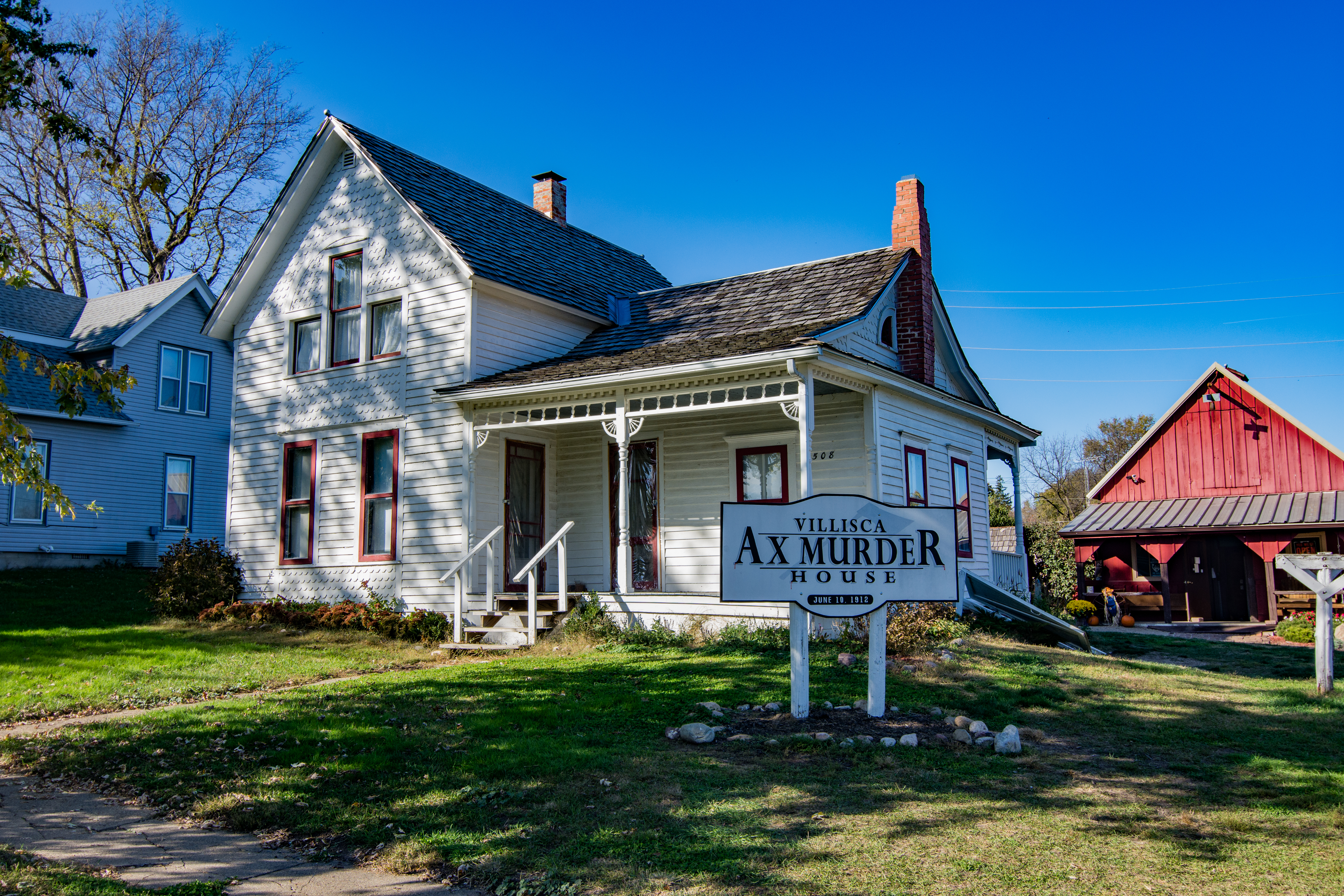
Today's view of the Moore residence.

The last family murder in the Midwestern series occurred less than a week later on the night of June 9 to 10, 1912 in Villisca, Iowa. The victims were Josiah Moore, 43, his wife Sara, 39, and their four children Herman, 11, Katherine, 10, Boyd, 7, and Paul, 5. In addition, the killer also murdered two visiting girls, Lena Stillinger, 11, and Ina Stillinger, 8, who were friends with the Moore's children and had stayed for a sleepover.

The crimes were discovered the next morning, when one of the neighbors became concerned that nobody stirred at the house. She notified Josiah Moore's brother, who, after having made entry into the house, found that all inside had been killed by blows to the head with the blunt side of an axe. The killer may have entered through an unlocked back door. Inside the house he had lit a lamp, removed its chimney and placed it under a chair. The subsequent attacks must have been swift and determined, as all the victims died in their beds. After the murders, the killer covered the victims' faces, mirrors, windows, and a telephone. Then he lit another lamp, the chimney of which was also removed, locked all the doors and windows, and washed his hands. He pulled down the body of Lena Stillinger, staged her in a sexually explicit manner and possibly masturbated over her dead body. When he left the house, he left the axe, which was taken from the house, at the scene. No valuable items were taken from the house.

Like in Colorado Springs, Ellsworth, and Paolo, there may have been a second attempt that night. At 2:10 AM, Villisca resident Xenia Delaney was awoken by the noise of someone walking up the stairs to her floor. Next, this person would try the door, but, finding it locked, would turn around and leave the way he came.

When the murders of the Moore family and their two visitors were discovered the morning of June 10, the police deployed bloodhounds that followed a trail to a junction of two railway lines. Although the case was initially linked to the other murders in the series, the public and authorities soon focused on local suspects. One of them, an English immigrant named George J. Kelly, was tried but ultimately acquitted.

=== Possible subsequent murders ===
A number of authors have speculated whether any later crimes should be considered to be part of the series. One possible crime is the Pfannschmidt murders, where on September 27, 1912, the Pfannschmidt family was murdered in their beds and their house was burned afterward. The main suspect was the only surviving member of the family, Ray Pfannschmidt, who, as his defense, blamed the murders on Billy the Axeman. Another example is the Kellar family murders, where on June 10, 1913, the Kellar family was murdered in their beds. The 1922 Hinterkaifeck murders in Germany are also speculated to have possibly been committed by the same killer.

== Extended theories ==
=== Mulatto Axe Murders (1911–1912) ===
During the years 1911–1912, the southern states of Texas and Louisiana saw a series of axe murders with a very similar MO compared to the Midwestern series. The killings also involved whole families being murdered at night with an axe. In addition, robbery was not a motive in any of the crimes and most victims lived very close to railways. While the number of crimes that are attributed to this axe murderer varies as well, thirteen family murders with a total of 49 victims are usually discussed within the context of this series.

The main difference to the northern crimes was the fact that all the killings involved families with black or mixed race members. For this reason, the press coined the term Mulatto Axe Murders for the series. At the time, a person named Clementine Barnabet was accused of being involved in these murders. Ultimately, she was convicted for one murder.

Timeline of the axe murders associated with the Northwestern, Midwestern, and Southern crimes. Murders are marked with black marks. Inferred ranges of the murder period in the Northwest, Midwest and South are given as blue, green and red bars, respectively.

In 2015, Todd Elliott connected these two series, claiming that a single killer was responsible for both. He based this on the similarity in the modus operandi and the fact that the southern crimes always stopped in the summer months just when the crimes in the northern series were taking place. In 2017, Bill James and McCarthy James also discussed a possible connection between the two series. According to them, at least one of the murders was certainly committed by the same killer, while others are less likely and may have been copycat crimes.

=== Earlier family murders ===
Bill James and McCarthy James strongly divert from the theories discussed so far. They cite Klingensmith as a source but believe the crimes of early 1911 show a mature modus operandi, which may indicate an experienced serial killer active by that date. They, therefore, conducted an extensive literature search to find possible earlier axe family murders. Depending on how well the additional details in each case agree with the modus operandi established for the Midwestern axe murders, they then try to judge whether the same serial killer could have committed them.

Timeline of the axe murders that may have been committed by the Midwestern axe murderer according to the theory presented in The Man from the Train. Murders which are likely are marked with black marks and murders which were possibly committed are marked with gray marks. Inferred ranges of the murder period in the Northwest, Midwest, South, and Northeast are given as blue, green, red and yellow bars, respectively

In their research, they find a substantial number of murders that fit the modus operandi, but no definite candidates for the period between summer 1906 and summer 1909. They speculate this long pause may indicate that the axe murderer was imprisoned for other offenses, possibly a planned murder which was interrupted and sentenced as burglary. During the whole time frame from 1900 to 1910 they discuss eleven crimes which they conclude were likely committed by the same killer, and thirteen other crimes possibly committed by the same axe murderer. With the exception of the Lyerly case, these crimes had effectively been forgotten.

== Suspects ==
=== Henry Lee Moore ===
Henry Lee Moore was convicted in Missouri in 1913 for the axe murder of his mother and grandmother and sentenced to life in prison. Due to some similarities in this murder as well as the fact that he was released just before the murders in Colorado Springs, special agent W. M. McClaughry suspected Moore to be the culprit behind the Midwest axe murders. More recently, several authors have argued against this identification.

=== Charles Marzyck ===
Charles Marzyck was the former brother in law of Pauline Showman and a suspect in the killing of her and her family. It was also alleged that he had connections to Monmouth and Colorado Springs which lead to speculations he might be connected to these murders as well. Police were able to apprehend Marzyck and bring him to Ellsworth. He could, however, provide evidence for his innocence and was ultimately released.

=== Lovey Mitchell ===
Lovey Mitchell was charged and tried two times for the Monmouth murders that happened in 1911. During the trial, he was connected by the press with the other murders in the series. Mitchell was ultimately declared innocent and released as a free man in 1918. In a review article on historical serial killers, Philip Jenkins again named Mitchell as being responsible for the Midwest axe murders.

=== George Kelly ===
George Kelly was an English-born traveling minister who became a major suspect in the Villisca Axe Murders. These murders are the last and most well-known of the family murders in the Midwestern series. At the time, he was tried for the murders but ultimately acquitted of the crimes. Based on the religious elements present in the Southern axe murder series, Todd Elliott suspected Kelly to be the serial killer responsible for both the Midwestern and Southern crimes series.

=== Paul Müller ===
Paul Müller (or Mueller) was a German-born farmhand who became the main suspect in the 1898 slaying of the Newton family near West Brookfield, Massachusetts and the object of an extended manhunt afterwards. In their 2017 book The Man from the Train, authors Bill James and Rachel McCarthy James identify Mueller as the most likely candidate for being the axe murderer in dozens of incidents nationwide, based on the similarities in the crimes. This identification of Mueller was endorsed by professor Harold Schechter after their book came out, calling it the "most probable solution".

Bill James and Rachel McCarthy James believed the later crimes showed a mature modus operandi, indicating the crimes were likely committed by an experienced killer. Starting at the Villisca murders, they looked through newspapers for earlier crimes that had similar traits and believed the first crimes by this killer might not have been linked to him due to inexperience. According to the authors, the murders of the Newton family meet these criteria and was likely the first of many murders committed by Mueller.

== See also ==
- Axeman of New Orleans
- Clementine Barnabet
- List of serial killers in the United States
