= Villisca axe murders =

1912 killing spree in Iowa, US

Coordinates: 40.9308091°N 94.9739235°W

Villisca Axe Murders
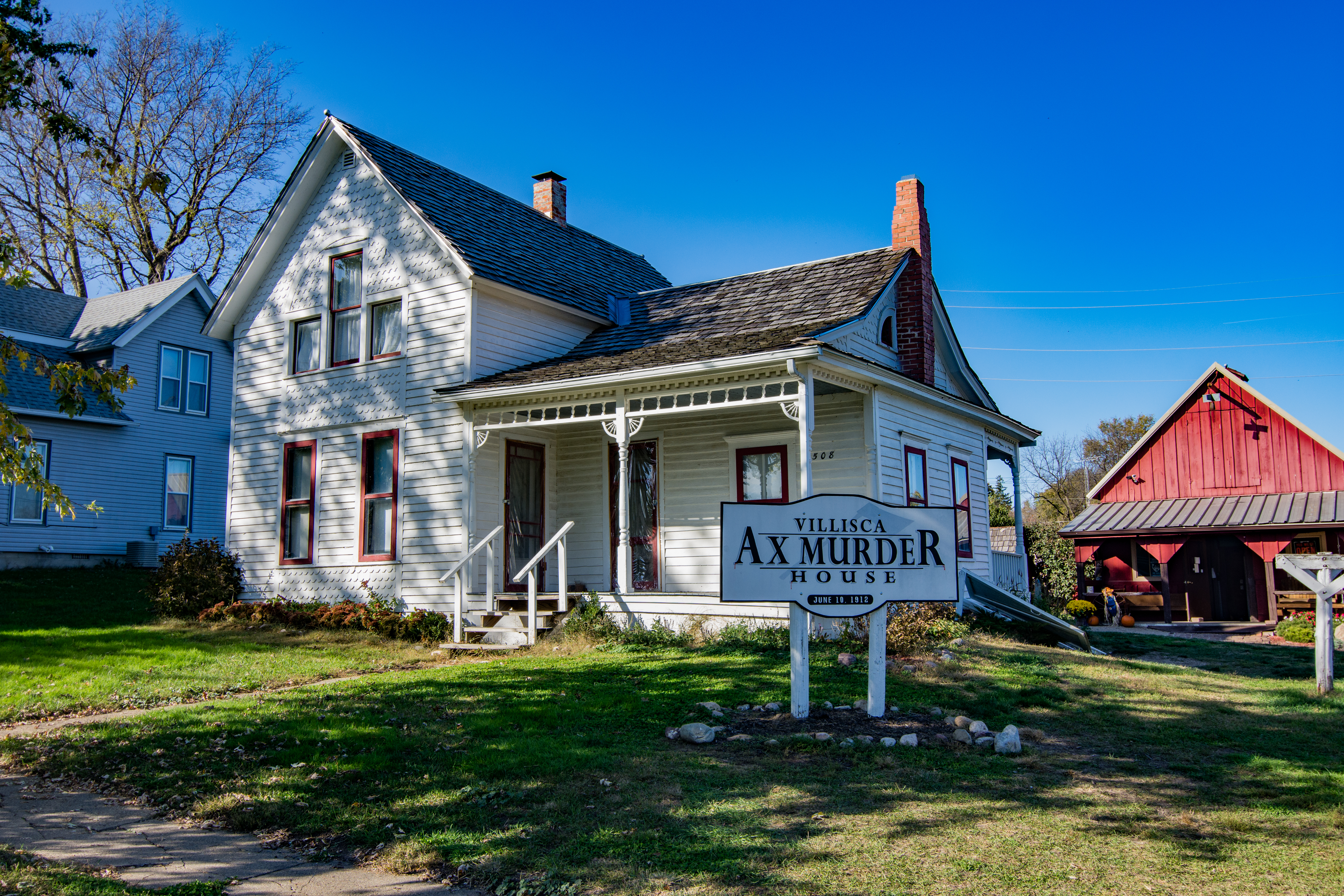
- The house where the murders took place
- Location: Villisca, Iowa, U.S.
- Date: June 9–10, 1912; Late night to early morning
- Target: Moore family and 2 guests
- Attack type: Mass murder, home invasion
- Weapon: Axe
- Deaths: 8
- Perpetrator: Henry Lee Moore (heavily theorized)
- Motive: Unknown
- Accused: Rev. George Kelly
- Verdict: Not guilty (2nd trial)

The Villisca axe murders occurred during the night of June 9 to the early morning of June 10, 1912, in the town of Villisca, Iowa, in the United States. The six members of the Moore family and two guests were found bludgeoned in the Moore residence. All eight victims, including six children, had severe head wounds from an axe. A lengthy investigation yielded several suspects.

The house was restored in the 1990s and is known as the Villisca Axe Murder House.

== Details ==
Location of Villisca in the state of Iowa

The victims consisted of parents Josiah B. (aged 43), Sarah (née Montgomery) (39), and their four children: Herman Montgomery (11), Mary Katherine (10), Arthur Boyd (7), and Paul Vernon (5). An affluent family, the Moores were well known and well liked in their community.

On June 9, 1912, Mary Katherine Moore invited Ina May (8) and Lena Gertrude Stillinger (11) to spend the night at the Moore residence. That evening, the visiting girls and the Moore family attended the Presbyterian church where they participated in the Children's Day Program, which Sarah had coordinated. After the program ended at 9:30 p.m., the Moores and the Stillinger sisters walked to the Moores' house, arriving between 9:45 and 10 p.m.

== Discovery of the crime ==
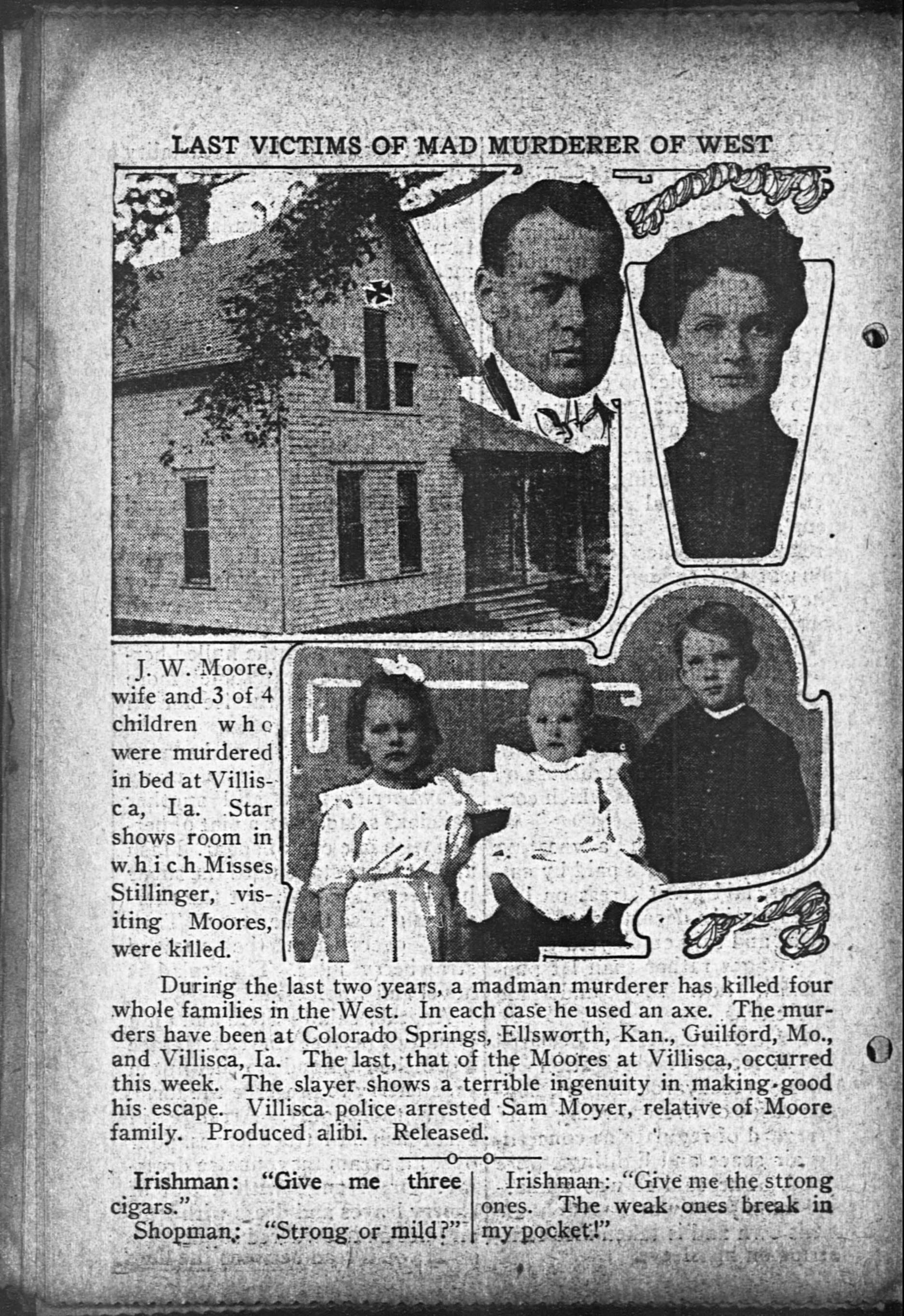
An article in The Day Book, Chicago, June 14, 1912, depicting five of the victims and the house

At 7 a.m. the next day, June 10, Mary Peckham, the Moores' neighbor, became concerned after she noticed that the family had not come out to do their morning chores. Peckham knocked on the Moores' door. When nobody answered, she tried to open the door and discovered that it was locked.

Peckham let the Moores' chickens out and called Ross Moore, Josiah's brother. Like Peckham, Moore received no response when he knocked on the door and shouted. Ross unlocked the front door with his copy of the house key.

While Peckham stood on the porch, Ross went into the parlor and opened the guest bedroom door, where he found Ina and Lena Stillinger's bodies on the bed. Moore immediately told Peckham to call Henry "Hank" Horton, Villisca's primary peace officer, who arrived shortly thereafter. Horton's search of the house revealed that the entire Moore family and the two Stillinger girls had been bludgeoned to death.

The murder weapon, an axe belonging to Josiah, was found in the guest room where the Stillinger sisters were found.

The murders occurred sometime after the Moore family and Stillinger sisters returned home on the night of June 9, 1912, and before their bodies were discovered the following morning.

Two spent cigarettes in the attic suggested that the killer or killers patiently waited in the attic until the Moore family and the Stillinger guests were asleep.

The killer(s) began in the master bedroom, where Josiah and Sarah Moore were sleeping.Josiah received more blows from the axe than any other victim; his face had been cut to such an extent that his eyes were completely destroyed. The ceiling in his room also had a gouge mark from when the murderer lifted the axe to murder him.

Herman, Mary Katherine, Arthur, and Paul were next bludgeoned in the head in the same manner as their parents. Afterwards, the murderer returned to the master bedroom to inflict more blows on the elder Moores, before moving downstairs to the guest bedroom and killing Ina and Lena.

Seemingly afterwards, a 4 lb (1.8 kg) slab of bacon was taken out of the icebox and laid next to the axe. Investigators also found untouched food and bloody water on the kitchen table during the search.

Investigators believed that all of the victims except for Lena Stillinger had been asleep when murdered.They thought that she was awake and tried to fight back, as she was found lying crosswise on the bed, and with a defensive wound on her arm. Lena's nightgown had been pushed up, leaving her exposed.Her leg had been positioned in such a way to reveal her genitalia. This led to law enforcement speculation that the killer(s) sexually molested her or attempted to do so. Later investigations showed no evidence of this.

In another bizarre twist, every mirror in the house was covered with blankets, clothing, or any means of covering. Garments were removed from the dressers to cover the mirrors.

== Aftermath ==
After the search of the house, people were let into the house to view the scene.Sometime around 8:40 a.m, the town's central telephone office issued an "all call" alert, advising every household in the town of the murders.

Within minutes, townspeople began crowding into the house. This completely contaminated the scene, with some people even stealing pieces of Josiah's skull as souvenirs. The murder weapon was handled by hundreds that came through the house. The sheriff was unable to gain control of the scene for hours.

The county coroner, Dr. Lindquist, arrived at the scene of the crime later that morning. After viewing the scene himself, Lindquist met with Horton, who had been the town’s night watchman that Sunday, and Sheriff Oren Jackson to review the information they had collected. Lindquist was upset by the constant influx of townsfolk interfering with the investigation and urged the sheriff to get the national guard to secure the scene.

By 10:30 a.m., The National Guard had established a secure perimeter to keep people out.

A local druggist whose hobby was photography showed up to take photos, but he was dismissed and told taking photos was “too ghoulish." Many drugstores sold postcards of crime scenes at the time.

Although Lindquist called members of the Coroner’s Jury together in late afternoon, it was several hours before they entered the Moore home to view the bodies.

After 10:00 p.m., Lindquist called County Attorney Ratcliff to finally give permission to the undertaker to remove the bodies.The fire station had been set up as a temporary morgue and it was close to 2 a.m. before all the bodies had been transported there.

The attic space where the killer is said to have hidden

== Investigation ==
Doctors estimated that the murders occurred between midnight and 2 a.m., and the victims’ autopsies revealed all died from severe head trauma.Questions arose as to how a murderer could maneuver in a compact, creaking farmhouse without waking anyone.At the time, newspapers proposed a theory that the murderer put a sedative in milk or cocoa eaten by the family, but toxicology studies were not routinely performed during autopsies at the time.

Investigators found an imprint in the hay in the barn next to a knothole, where they believe the killer observed the family for some time. Two spent cigarettes found in the attic suggested the murderer could have entered the house via a window or unlocked back door and hid until the family returned from church.

A gas lamp with its glass chimney removed and its wick turned down so it would give off only a faint light was discovered upstairs. A fragment of a keychain that didn't belong to any member of the Moore family was found downstairs.

On June 11, 1912, a coroner’s inquest was convened to investigate the murders.

== Suspects ==
Over time, many possible suspects emerged, including Reverend George Kelly, Frank F. Jones, William Mansfield, Loving Mitchell, and Henry Lee Moore (no relation).

=== Andrew Sawyer ===
Andrew Sawyer was among the suspects investigated in connection with the murders, but authorities later concluded that he couldn't have committed the crime.While working with a railroad crew, Sawyer reportedly showed a strong interest in the murders.According to railroad foreman Thomas Dyer, Sawyer slept in his clothes and kept an axe beside him while he slept.Dyer also reported that Sawyer frequently discussed the Villisca murders.

=== Reverend George Kelly ===
George Lyn Jacklin Kelly was an English-born minister who was in Villisca at the time of the murders.

Kelly was described as peculiar, reportedly having suffered a mental breakdown as an adolescent.As an adult, he was accused of peeping and several times asking young women and girls to pose nude for him.On June 8, 1912, he came to Villisca to teach at the Children's Day services, which the Moore family attended on June 9, 1912.He left Villisca on the 5:19 a.m. train on June 10, 1912, hours before the bodies were discovered.On August 31, 1917, Kelly signed a confession to the murders, but he later recanted at trial.

In the weeks that followed, he displayed a fascination with the case and wrote many letters to the police, investigators, and family of the deceased. This aroused suspicion, and a private investigator wrote back to Reverend Kelly, asking for details that the minister might know about the murders.Kelly replied with great detail, claiming to have heard sounds and possibly witnessed the murders.His known mental illness made authorities question whether he knew the details because of having committed the murders or was imagining his account.

In 1914, two years after the murders, Kelly was arrested for sending obscene material through the mail.He was sent to St. Elizabeths Hospital, the national mental hospital in Washington, D.C.Investigators speculated again that Kelly could be the murderer of the Moore family.

In 1917, Kelly was arrested for the Villisca murders.Police obtained a confession from him after hours of interrogation, but Kelly later recanted.

Kelly’s first trial ended in a hung jury, with eleven jurors favoring acquittal. He was tried again and acquitted in November 1917.

=== Frank F. Jones ===
Frank Fernando Jones was a Villisca businessman who later served as Iowa state senator.Josiah Moore worked for Jones for seven years before leaving in 1907 to establish a competing farm-equipment business, taking the John Deere account with him.

Moore was rumored to have had an affair with Jones’s daughter-in-law, though no evidence supports this.

=== William Mansfield ===
Detective James N. Wilkerson alleged that Frank Jones had hired William Mansfield, whom Wilkerson named "Insane Blackie," to murder Josiah Moore.

The Colorado Springs murders were closely related to the Villisca murders. Mr. H.C. Wayne, his wife and child and Mrs. A. J. Burnham, and her two children were killed with an axe.

At the Wayne and Burnham homes, bedsheets were stretched across the windows.As in Villlisca, the murder in Colorado Springs reportedly wiped blood from the axe and covered the victims heads with bed clothes.

Detective James N. Wilkerson suspected Mansfield of involvement in the Villisca murders and alleged that Frank Jones had hired him to kill Josiah. Mansfield was arrested and interrogated, but investigators failed to obtain confession.July 1916, a Montgomery County grand jury declined to indict him, and he was released.

In each case, the murderer avoided leaving fingerprints by wearing gloves, which Wilkerson argued that the absence of fingerprints supported his theory that Mansfield was the killer, noting that Mansfield had previously been imprisoned and was familiar with fingerprint identification.

In 1916, a grand jury investigated Mansfield, who was arrested and brought to Montgomery County from Kansas City.

Payroll records, however, provided an alibi that placed Mansfield in Illinois at the time of the Villisca murders.

Mansfield was released after the grand jury declined to indict him. He later successfully sued the William J. Burns International Detective Agency and was awarded $2,250 in damages.

R.H Thorpe, a restaurant owner from Shenandoah, Iowa, identified Mansfield as the man he saw the morning after the Villisca murders boarding a train at Clarinda.This man said he had walked from Villisca.

=== Henry Lee Moore ===
Henry Lee Moore, who was not related to the Moore family, was a suspected serial killer who was convicted of killing his mother and grandmother with an axe several months after the Villisca killings.Investigators also considered possible connections the Villisca murders and other axe murders committed around the same period.

Investigator W. M. McClaughry later theorized that Henry Lee Moore might have been responsible for a series of similar axe murders.

=== Samuel E. Moyer ===
At the inquest, witnesses reportedly stated that Samuel Elias Moyer, Josiah Moore’s brother-in-law, had threatened to kill Moore. Investigators later determined that Moyer had an alibi.

=== Paul Mueller ===
In their 2017 book The Man from the Train, Bill James and Rachel McCarthy examined the Villisca murders as part of a possible series of related axe murders.

Bill James and Rachel McCarthy James proposed that the Villisca murders were part of a much larger series of related killings.

Bill James and Rachel McCarthy James identified Paul Mueller as their suspected killer. Mueller had previously been sought in connection with the 1897 axe murders of the Newton family near West Brookfield, Massachusetts, where he had worked as a farmhand.

== See also ==
- Billy the Axeman
- Ardenwald axe murders – similar massacre in Oregon
- Hinterkaifeck murders – similar massacre in Germany
- List of unsolved murders (1900–1979)
