= Kerf (disambiguation) =

Kerf is the width of a saw cut.

Kerf may also refer to:

- Kerf, molten metal and metal oxide blown out when metal is cut by an oxy-gas torch: see Oxy-fuel welding and cutting
- Kerf (sculpture), a pair of cast-concrete works by Thomas Sayre in Portland, Oregon, US
- Kerf, a poetry collection by Peter Sanger
- Kerf dust, a byproduct of sawing silicon ingots into wafers, esp. in production of Photovoltaics
- The Kerf, a poetry publication of the College of the Redwoods, Del Norte Center for Writing in Crescent City, California
- Kerala E.N.T. Research Foundation (KERF), a hospital at Kollam in Kerala, India
