= Man on the Train =

(The) Man on the Train may refer to:

- The Man on the Train (2002 film), a French crime-drama film
- Man on the Train (2011 film), a Canadian crime-drama film

== See also ==
- The Man from the Train, a 2017 true crime book
