= Henry Lee Moore =

American suspected serial killer

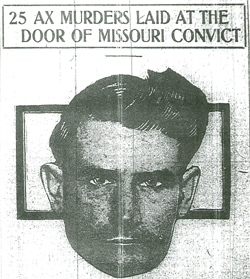
- Photo of Moore from a newspaper excerpt, c. 1913
- Born: November 1, 1874; Columbia, Missouri, U.S.
- Died: September 30, 1963 (aged 88); St. Louis, Missouri, U.S.
- Other name: L. Smith
- Conviction: First-degree murder (2 counts)
- Penalty: Life imprisonment; commuted and released in 1949

Details
- Victims: 2–25
- Span of crimes: 1910–1912
- Country: United States
- States: Florida, Missouri, Illinois, Iowa, Colorado, Kansas

Henry Lee Moore (November 1, 1874 – September 30, 1963) was an American murderer and suspected serial mass murderer who was convicted of killing his mother and grandmother with an axe in their home. While in prison, it was alleged by a Justice Department agent named W. M. McClaughry that Moore was possibly responsible for a string of unsolved axe murders in several states, among them being the Villisca axe murders.

== Early life and first imprisonment ==
Born and raised in Columbia, Moore lived with his parents, grandparents, and siblings but worked as a blacksmith's helper at various car shops in Moberly, along the Wabash Railroad. Although described as a friendly-looking man, he had the morbid habit of visiting various morgues in St. Louis with the purpose of looking at the bodies. Not only that, he also collected newspaper scraps from infamous criminal cases, including that of Dr. Hawley Harvey Crippen.

Moore communicated with various women through letters, and in May 1910, he was arrested in Wichita, Kansas, for forgery. He was convicted and sentenced to a year of imprisonment in the Hutchinson Reformatory, receiving his parole in May 1911.

== Double murders ==
Sometime after his release, Moore began corresponding with a 16-year-old Columbia girl named Queenie Nichols, eventually professing his love for her. However, Nichols rejected him because he had no home of his own. In response to this, he wrote a letter to her that soon his mother's home would be his, along with all the money in there.

A day before the murder, Moore travelled by train to Columbia and registered at the Central Hotel under the alias of L. Smith. On the night of December 17, 1912, he snuck into the house carrying a rusty axe with a broken handle, which was normally used for handling coal. He crept up behind his 59-year-old mother, Georgia, who was sitting in a chair and rubbing herself with an ointment for her joints, and began hitting her on the neck and head.

After killing her, Henry moved on to the bedroom, where his 81-year-old grandmother Mary Wilson was sleeping. Using this as an advantage, he struck her with the axe on the neck and head, killing Wilson before she could make a move to defend herself. Shortly thereafter, Henry left the house, disposing of the axe in a nearby ditch. He then returned to his hotel room to clean off the blood but in his haste, left a lot of it on the bedsheets, his clothes, and some on his arms.

The following day, he pretended to have just arrived, and upon "discovering" the bodies, he called the neighbors. Police came to the scene, but after investigating Henry's whereabouts he was quickly arrested, as it was quickly revealed that he had stayed in the hotel and blood was found on his clothing and bed sheets for which no explanation was given. Authorities also found an insurance policy in Moore's pocket, but it turned out that it had been on Henry's life, payable to his mother.

== Trial, sentence, and later life ==
While incarcerated, Moore refused to comment on the murders, but talked freely about his character, his poetry, and his innocence. According to him, he had just arrived in town from Moberly to celebrate Christmas, and simply happened upon the grisly crime scene. He also denied all the claims made by the newspapers about his nighttime morgue visits, proudly stating that nobody in his family had even been convicted of a crime and that this was his first time in prison.

Upon further investigation, Prosecuting Attorney E. C. Anderson quickly debunked Moore's explanations, stating that there were witnesses and enough circumstantial evidence to connect him to the killings. He also noted that the accused's claim of being a student at the Kansas State Agricultural College was simply untrue, and concerning his prison sentence, Anderson said that Moore was most likely a drug addict. Despite all of his protestation of innocence, Moore was found guilty of the double murder on March 14, after a four-day trial with 80 jurors present. However, the jury spared Moore from execution, instead giving him a sentence of life imprisonment. His attorney tried to appeal to the Supreme Court, but his request was denied.

Moore was paroled by Governor Forrest Smith in December 1949. In July 1956, his sentence was commuted. The then 81-year-old Moore was last recorded as living at a Salvation Army Center in St. Louis later that year. No further information about him is available. He died on September 30, 1963, due to heart failure and kidney failure in St. Louis. He was 88 years old.

== Serial killer theory ==
After some time, Moore's fingerprints and prison record were sent in for examination by W. M. McClaughry, an investigator in the Villisca axe murders, to J. H. Livingston, a fingerprinting expert in Jefferson City. Livingston suggested that the prisoner could have something to do with the string of axe murders, which the press had labeled as Billy the Axeman. Given the coincidental timing that Moore had just been released at the start of the spree, led McClaughry to propose this theory. According to it, Moore was possibly responsible for these murders:

- Acreman Murders (May 14, 1906, in Allentown, Florida): The burnt bodies of William Glenn Acreman (an itinerant preacher and tenant farmer, age 37), his wife Amanda Sorrells Acreman (ages 38–39), their four sons, two daughters, and a three-day-old infant child were found murdered in a rural area near Allentown, Florida (about 10 miles north of Milton); all the victims reportedly had their skulls crushed with a heavy, blunt weapon like an axe before the house was set ablaze. An axe was later found in the ruins of the home.
- Burnham-Wayne Murders (September 17, 1911, in Colorado Springs, Colorado): The bodies of May Alice Burnham and her two children, Nellie and John, were discovered by her sister when she called on their home on Dale Street. When news of the murder spread, crowds appeared, and one neighbor found it odd that the neighbors directly behind the Burnham home had not appeared to see what was going on. Henry F. Wayne, his wife Blanche, and eighteen-month-old daughter Lula were found murdered in their home on Harrison Place. Arthur Burnham, the husband of one of the victims, was arrested on suspicion, but later released. He was suffering from tuberculosis and had been a ward at the local sanitarium during the murders. He passed from his illness a few months later.
- Dawson Murders (October 1911, in Monmouth, Illinois): M. E. Dawson, along with his wife and daughter, was killed with an axe.
- Showman Murders (October 1911, in Ellsworth, Kansas): William Showman, along with his wife and three children, was also killed with an axe.
- Hudson Murders (June 1912, in Paola, Kansas): Roland Hudson and his wife were killed with an axe.
- Villisca axe murders (June 10–11, 1912 in Villisca, Iowa): the Moore Family (no relation to Henry Lee Moore), as well as two visiting girls named Ina Mae and Lena Stillinger, were axed to death at the Moores' home.

McClaughry's theory was overblown by the contemporary media, who claimed that he was stating it as fact and not speculation. An inquest was even started by Police Chief Burno of Colorado Springs into the Burnham-Wayne murders, as a man resembling Moore was seen in the city following the grisly killings, but had quickly left and was never seen again. However, this was later discredited by M. F. Amrine, Superintendent of the Kansas State Reformatory, who reported that Moore was corresponding with him at the time of the murders and that Henry was at home in Columbia.

A similar inquest was also initiated by Chief Chargeois for a 1911 axe murder that took place in Lafayette, Louisiana. Although Clementine Barnabet and one of her followers were suspected of that crime, the man had already been imprisoned at the time of the killings. The result from the investigation is currently unknown, but it is presumed that it was called off.

In regard to the Villisca murders, few of the residents believed the theory. However, according to Joseph Stillinger, father of the killed Lena, Moore very much resembled a man that once worked for him. That man, who had given his name as "Hellum", was hired in April 1912 and worked for only a week before disappearing. Stillinger and an officer later went on to confront Moore in prison, but, most likely, the mysterious man was not Henry Lee Moore.

== See also ==
- List of serial killers in the United States

== Bibliography and further reading ==
- Gentry, North Todd (1916). The Bench and Bar of Boone County, Missouri: Including the History of Judges, Lawyers, and Courts, and an Account of Noted Cases, Slavery Litigation, Lawyers in War Times, Public Addresses, Political Notes, Etc. North Todd Gentry.
- Hunt, Amber (January 16, 2024). Crimes of the Centuries: The Cases That Changed Us. Union Square & Company. ISBN 978-1-4549-4911-4.
- Jenkins, Philip. Using Murder: The Social Construction of Serial Homicide. Transaction Publishers. ISBN 978-1-4128-4090-3.
- Lehto, Steve (February 3, 2015). American Murder Houses: A Coast-to-Coast Tour of the Most Notorious Houses of Homicide. Penguin Books. ISBN 978-1-101-59301-1.
- Newton, Michael (1992). Serial Slaughter: What's Behind America's Murder Epidemic?. Loompanics. ISBN 978-1-55950-078-4.
- Slater, Shirley; Edson, Jane (2006). The McCready Family Information Resource: The Descendants of Robert McCready 1752-1846. Edson, Hart, Slater.
- Vronsky, Peter (October 5, 2004). Serial Killers: The Method and Madness of Monsters. Penguin Books. ISBN 978-0-425-19640-3.
