= SE Tacoma/Johnson Creek station =

Light rail station on Oregon, US

SE Tacoma/Johnson Creek
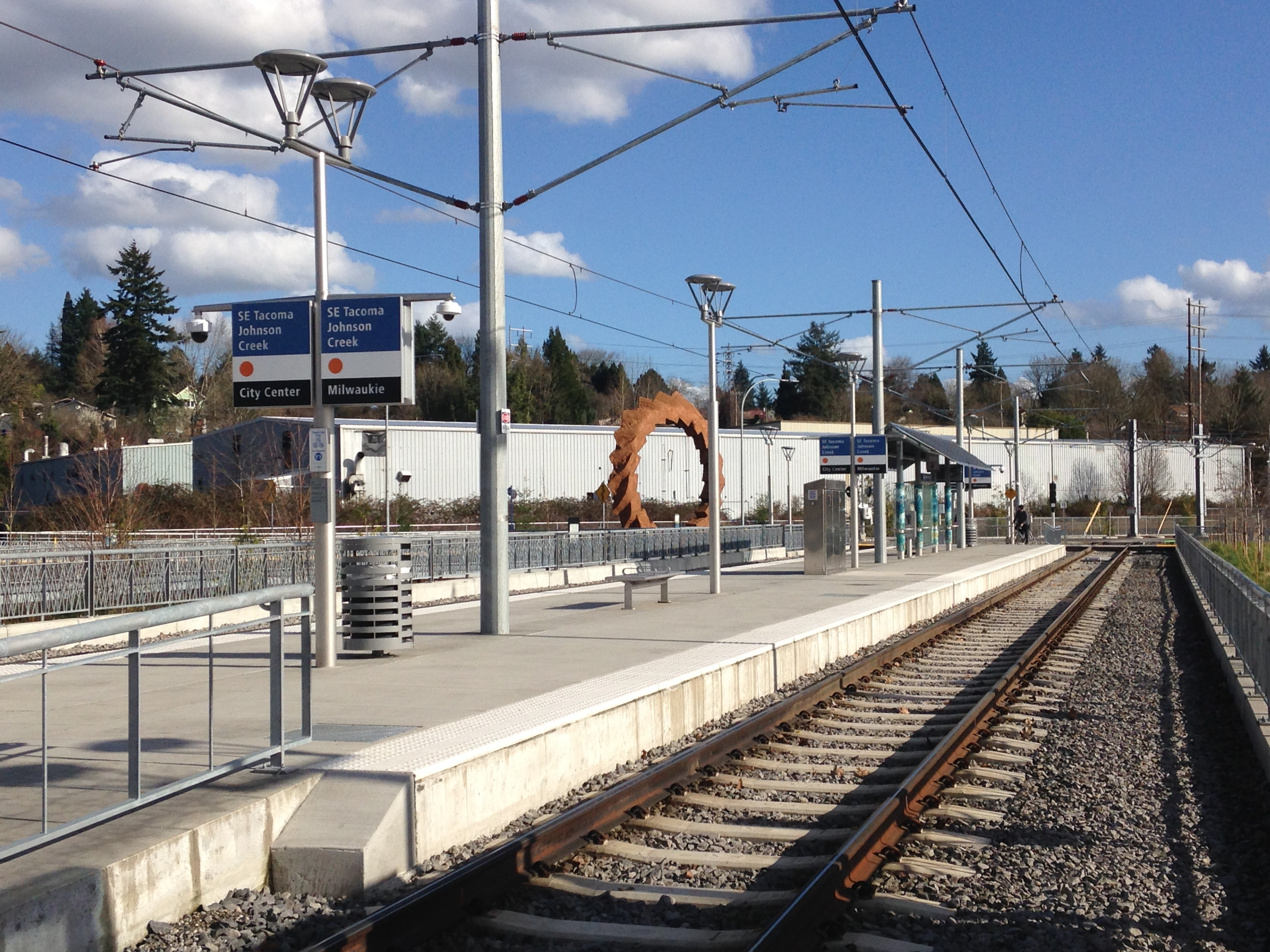

General information
- Location: 8300 Southeast McLoughlin Boulevard; Portland, Oregon, U.S.
- Coordinates: 45°27′46″N 122°38′16″W
- Owner: TriMet
- Platforms: 1 island platform
- Tracks: 2
- Bus routes: 34, 40
- Bus operators: TriMet

Construction
- Parking: 318 park and ride spaces
- Cycle facilities: 72 secure and 34 rack spaces
- Accessible: yes

History
- Opened: September 12, 2015

Services
Preceding station	TriMet	Following station
Milwaukie/Main St toward SE Park Ave	Orange Line	SE Bybee Blvd toward PSU South/SW 6th & College
Location

SE Tacoma/Johnson Creek is a light rail station in Portland, Oregon, United States, served by TriMet as part of MAX Light Rail. It is the 15th station southbound on the Orange Line, which operates between Portland City Center, Southeast Portland, Milwaukie, and Oak Grove. The island platform station borders Southeast Tacoma Street to the north, Union Pacific (UP) railroad tracks to the east, the Springwater Corridor Trail to the south, and Southeast McLoughlin Boulevard (Oregon Route 99E) to the west. It includes a 318-space park and ride, a 72-space bike and ride, and connections with TriMet bus routes 34–Oatfield/River Rd and 40–Tacoma/Swan Island.

The station serves the Sellwood and Ardenwald neighborhoods. The station is located adjacent to Oregon Route 99E and can be directly accessed by northbound traffic and by traffic from the portion of SE Tenino Street that connects SE Tacoma to SE Johnson Creek Boulevard.

The station is located where the historic Oregon Woolen Mills once operated and in more recent years was the past location of the Goodwill mega-store known as the "Goodwill Bins". Past plans called for the site to be developed as a Wal-Mart and was staunchly opposed by area residents.

== Bus service ==
- Line 34 - Oatfield/River Rd
- Line 40 - Tacoma/Swan Island

Discontinued 8/23/24

- 99-Macadam/McLoughlin Express

== See also ==
- Kerf (sculpture), public art installed at the station
