= Clementine Barnabet =

American alleged serial killer

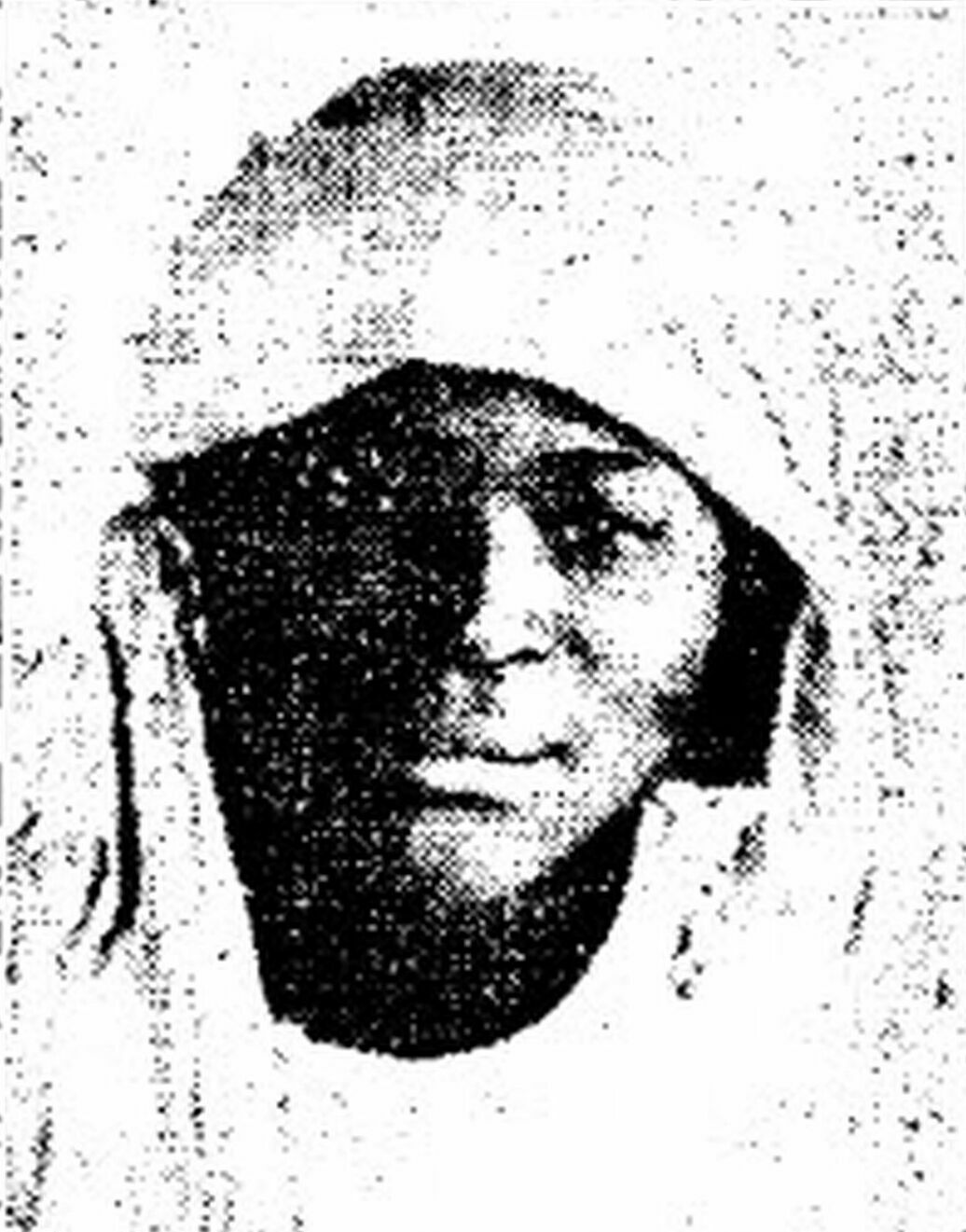
- Barnabet in 1911
- Born: c. 1894; St. Martin Parish, Louisiana, U.S.
- Disappeared: August 28, 1923 (aged 29–30); West Feliciana Parish, Louisiana, U.S.
- Died: after 1923
- Occupation: Housekeeper

Details
- Victims: One conviction, up to 35 confessed
- Span of crimes: February 1911 – November 1911
- Country: United States
- States: Louisiana; Texas

Clementine Barnabet (c. 1894 – after 1923) was an American suspected serial killer. She initially confessed to perpetrating at least two mass murders in February and November 1911, and while in custody, Barnabet claimed involvement in a total of 35 killings in the Acadiana region of Louisiana and southeastern Texas, taking responsibility for nineteen of them. Authorities would link her to several more unsolved cases in both states, including some committed during her stay in jail, bringing the upper estimate of connected murders up to 52. Barnabet was charged with nineteen counts of murder, but ultimately convicted of just one. Barnabet was released from custody in 1923, her subsequent activities and whereabouts are completely unknown.

In the 21st century, doubt has since been cast on Barnabet's confession. Historians have characterized the coverage on the murders as sensationalist, playing off of racial stereotypes and overhyping the violence, particularly supposed sexual and hoodoo elements, resulting in a moral panic. Professor Vance McLaughlin wrote: "Between 1911 and 1912, in towns along the Southern Pacific railroad line running through Louisiana and Texas, a minimum of twelve African-American families were murdered in their homes. All the murders occurred at night and an axe was used to fracture the skulls of the victims. Only one person, Clementine Barnabet, was ever punished for any of these homicides".

== Early life ==
Barnabet is believed to have been born in 1894, by her own account in or around St. Martinville, Louisiana. Her parents were Dina Porter and Raymond Barnabet, who were not married, with Dina being described as Raymond's companion or live-in girlfriend. Barnabet had at least one brother, named Zepherin, who had a different mother. Three other potential brothers are also mentioned in some articles, "Tatite", "Noah", and "Ferran", though "Ferran" appears to be a corruption or nickname of Zepherin. She also had a half-sister named Pauline, who had moved away to Rayne after marrying. Barnabet's father was a sharecropper and petty criminal who reportedly abused his family. Barnabet has been described as Creole, with contemporary coverage reporting her as a "half-breed", "half-blood", "mulatto", and, inaccurately and apparently by her own account, "only one-eighth negro". The Barnabets moved to Lafayette in 1909. Barnabet was 18 years old during her first trial in November 1911 and 19 years old at the time of her second confession in April 1912.

== Murders ==
=== Andrus family murder ===
On February 24, 1911, the Andrus family was murdered in their home in Lafayette. The Barnabet family were neighbors to the Andruses and on February 26, Raymond Barnabet was arrested by Lafayette Parish Sheriff Louis Lacoste on suspicion of murder, after a "mistress" implicated him in the crime, but Raymond was released for insufficient evidence within the week.

Raymond was re-arrested in July, after his daughter Clementine and son Ferran both testified against Raymond, claiming he had returned home with bloodied clothes and boasting of the Andrus murders. Dina Porter contradicted her children's testimony, saying she did not see blood or hear her boyfriend confess, but did attest to Raymond's violent tendencies and stated that he had previously threatened to kill her. Two other witnesses, neighbors Adelle Stevens and her mother, also denied seeing Raymond covered in blood the night of the murders. He was convicted of the Andrus murders on October 19, receiving capital punishment by hanging. Raymond didn't react directly to the verdict, but loudly muttered the words "goodbye" and "mo foutou" ("I'm done for" in Louisiana Creole) throughout the trial. Raymond's attorneys successfully filed for an appeal, reasoning that their client could not make a defense plea on account of being drunk from a smuggled bottle of wine, but he was held in jail pending a new trial.

=== Randall family murder and arrest ===
On November 27, 1911, while Raymond was imprisoned, Norbert and Azema Randall of Lafayette were murdered with their four children in a manner similar to the previous slayings. Barnabet lived a few blocks away as a live-in housekeeper for the Guidry family and was familiar with the Randalls, as she and Azema Randall were deaconesses at the same congregation. She was arrested the same day, after blood was found on a back entry gate of the Guidry residence and further came under suspicion due to a search of Barnabet's bedroom finding more blood on an apron, dress, and some underwear. A physician confirmed the remains to be human, alleged that the sample also contained brain matter, and determined that they were a physical match for those found on a pillow case in the Andrus residence. Barnabet initially denied involvement, admitting to the murders following a "third-degree" examination in New Orleans.

=== First trial and confession ===
During her trial for both the Andrus and Randall murders, Barnabet acted erratically by rocking back and forth in her chair while laughing. She admitted to her role in both cases and testified that she acted under the orders of the Church of Sacrifice, an alleged offshoot of a Christ's Sanctified Holy Church congregation in Lake Charles, Louisiana, stating that she had committed the ten murders because the families had "refused to obey message from God" and that she was acting alongside an unspecified number of accomplices. She also claimed to have murdered a woman and her children in Rayne while visiting her sister Pauline. Over the course of the following January, several more suspects were arrested, including her brother Zepherin, two men named Edwin Charles and Gregory Porter, who were with Barnabet the night of the Randall murders, and reverend King Harrison (also reported as King Harris), who led the original church branch in Lake Charles. By the end of January 1912, the murders of 26 black Louisiana residents were attributed to the Church of Sacrifices as ritualistic human sacrifices without evidence. While Clementine and Zepherin were both held in custody, the ax murders of families continued. Barnabet briefly recanted her confession after the hearing.

=== Second confession ===
On April 2, Barnabet confessed to involvement in 35 murders, claiming to have committed seventeen of them "with her own hands", later revising the number to twenty. She also claimed to have "caressed" the bodies of the victims by cradling their heads to her chest, even though only one case had the corpses moved post-mortem. The motive had changed with Barnabet stating that she and her accomplices "started out not knowing who the victims would be", but then picked out families with infants, even though none of the later targeted victims had newborns. The interrogations were led by Acadia Parish Sheriff Louis Fontenot, Chief Detective Peck, and Deputy Saul Broussard. On April 4, she repeated her confession to the press, after smoking cigars provided by journalists and singing Christian hymns such as "Nearer My God to Thee" and "Lead Kindly Light". Barnabet was reportedly excited about having her photo appear in the newspaper. On April 6, Barnabet claimed that her accomplice were targeting three families "near Lafayette", totalling 13 people, for "sacrifice". Her father Raymond, who had been rearrested due to his daughter's confession, again pleaded his innocence and supported the theory that Barnabet killed the Andrus family, claiming she went out the night of the murders and that he found bloodied clothes in her room.

Barnabet further claimed that she acquired "conjure bags" (a good luck charm found in Hoodoo), described as "two crossed needles, bound in thread and wrapped in red flannel and a few old rags", that would grant them supernatural powers and make them undetectable to the authorities. This spurred Barnabet into committing her first murder in Rayne, Louisiana in 1910 to test whether or not the claim of magical protection was true. She variously claimed to have received them from the Church of Sacrifice or to have bought them from a "hoodoo doctor" in New Iberia, and that she got them alongside four friends, her alleged future accomplices, who then drew lots to decide who would test the effectiveness of the charms. The Times-Democrat stated that other voodoo practitioners identified the "conjure bags" as a charm meant to heal back pain from rheumatism.

Barnabet's second confession contained lurid detail, but was not consistent with crime scene records. Barnabet would nearly always claim to have entered through the front door, when there were cases where a back window had been used for entry and describing the murder of the Randall family, Barnabet claimed to have shot Norbert Randall "somewhere in the breast or body" with a gun from her brother, after "braining him", when he had actually been shot in the forehead and mutilated after death. Her confessions were described in contemporary reports as "very self-contradictory" and would frequently change in details, whether due to her own revision or misreporting by newspapers. After remaining vague about the previously mentioned co-participants in the murders, Barnabet claimed a minimum of four alleged accomplices, two men and two women, but would only give the names of the other women, "Mary Conchon" and "Irene". One woman arrested as "Irene", Valena Mabry, was positively identified by Barnabet, but let go for having an alibi for the murders. Barnabet also first claimed only five people were part of the Church of Sacrifice, increasing the number of alleged followers to 105 before her first trial. During her second confession, Barnabet stated that she had been the sole perpetrator of the confessed murders, but still talked about having killed with others. Initially she still implicated her father in the Andrus murders, as well as two murders in Crowley and Rayne, but later protested his innocence. It was also reported that Barnabet had been the one to distribute the "conjure bags" to her accomplices rather than received the charms alongside them. She would also claim to have committed the Broussard family murders, despite the killings occurring during a time where she was verifiably in jail, and falsely claimed to have helped prepare the murdered Andrus family for their funeral.

Media also began to invent details about the case, such as referring to Barnabet as "the high priestress" or even leader of the Church of Sacrifice, which became characterized as a cult openly "founded on Voodooism", using Voodoo and Hoodoo interchangeably and reporting on the case as a display of "negro barbarity and religious superstition in the south". The Church of Sacrifice was connected without evidence to the Council of God church in New Orleans, infamous at the time for the 1907 killing of a white police officer. Newspapers invented descriptions of mysticism surrounding the number 5, falsely claiming that families of five were being targeted, buckets of blood were collected and that specific "rituals" were performed with the dead bodies, with details changing from account to account. Barnabet's given motive also fluctuated, initially presented as eliminating disobedient members of her church, a claims she did not repeat in her second confession. Instead, reasoning was fabricated by newspapers at the time, falsely attributing statements to Barnabet, including that the murders were for worship purposes or committed to perform rituals that would grant the church's followers immortality.

Media continued to connect ax murders of African-American families to the "Church of Sacrifice" in the months following Barnabet's arrest. One of the last such reports was on November 23, 1912, when William Esley, his wife and their four-year-old son were found murdered in their home in Philadelphia, Mississippi.

== Sentencing and disappearance ==
Barnabet's trial began on October 21, 1912. A team of court-hired physicians declared Barnabet sane, stating that she was "morally depraved, unusually ignorant and of a low grade of mentality, but not deficient in such a manner as to constitute her imbecile or idiot". Her attorney, John L. Kennedy, called his client's confessions unreliable and a result of her abusive childhood while also questioning the reliability of the forensic methods used to match the blood of the Andrus family to that found on Barnabet's clothes days later. On October 25, Barnabet was convicted of the murder of Azema Randall and sentenced to life in Louisiana State Penitentiary. On July 31, 1913, she escaped jail for a few hours, but was caught. During her imprisonment, Barnabet was noted as a model inmate and worked on the on-site sugarcane fields starting 1918. Barnabet was listed in the 1920 census, the only time she appeared in surviving government records, as aged 25.

However, on August 28, 1923, Barnabet was released from prison after an unspecified surgical operation was believed to have cured her (not a lobotomy, which was unknown in the United States until a decade later). The procedure was undertaken by the prison's doctor Sterling and another inmate, Wyatt H. Ingram, who had "studied medicine since his confinement and [became] a qualified physician and surgeon", after being imprisoned in 1909 for embezzling $100,000 (equivalent to $3,583,333 in 2025) as a bank trust officer. James and James argue that, "if authorities had actually believed that she was behind these terrible murders, it is unlikely that she would have been released after a few years in jail. She was turned loose so soon because the authorities didn't believe her story, either."

After Barnabet's release, no knowledge exists on her whereabouts.

== Victims ==
Barnabet was accused of killing seven families, totalling 35 people. This includes a confessed five-person murder committed on December 19, 1911, in Rayne, Louisiana, where she claimed to have killed a woman and her four children, but no mention of such deaths exist in Acadia Parish death records or contemporary media. It was also otherwise claimed that the killings instead occurred on or after "New Year's of 1911", sources differently interpreting it as December 31, 1910/1911 or January 1, 1911/1912.

The murders occurred within the houses of the victims. Every victim was slashed or bludgeoned with an ax, which was the cause of death for all except Norbert Randall, who died from a gunshot to the head. The weapon was always taken from the attacked residence, as it was common to keep axs or hatchets outside or in outdoor sheds for firewood. Nearly all victims were of African-American descent, with the exception of Elizabeth Casaway, who was white. The majority of victims were killed in their sleep, but it's believed that during the Dove family murder, daughters Jessie and Ethel fought with the attacker(s) due to turned over furniture and torn fabric at the scene. The families, who lived in black-majority areas, were typically found days after their deaths by relatives and neighbors, due to which newspapers occasionally list the dates the bodies were discovered as the day the victims were killed. The names of the victims are frequently misspelled, particularly in early reports. An article claims that victims Meme Andrus and Norbert Randall were siblings.

- January 24, 1911, in Crowley, Louisiana: William J. Byers, his wife, and their child; 3 killed
- February 24, 1911, in Lafayette, Louisiana: Alexander Andrus (30) and Meme/Mimi Andrus (née Felix; 29), and their two children, Joachim (3), and Agnes (11 months); 4 killed
- March 21, 1911, in San Antonio, Texas: Alfred Louis "A.L." Casaway (51) and Elizabeth Casaway (née Castelow; 37), and their three children, Louise (6), Josie (3), and Alfred Carlisle (5 months); 5 killed
- November 27, 1911, in Lafayette, Louisiana: Norbert Randall and Azema/Asima Randall, their three children, Rene (6), Norbert Jr. (5), and Agnes Randall (2), and a nephew, Albert Scyth/Sise (8); 6 killed
- January 19, 1912, in Crowley, Louisiana: Marie Warner (24) and her three children, Pearl (9), Garret (7), and Harriet (5); 4 killed
- January 20, 1912, in Lake Charles, Louisiana; Felix Broussard (40), Mathilda Broussard (36), and their three children Margaret (8), Louis (6), and Alberta "Sisie" (3); 5 killed
- February 18, 1912, in Beaumont, Texas: Harriet "Hattie" Dove (née Garrett; 39) and her three children, Jessie Quirk (18), Ernest (16), and Ethel (12); 4 killed

At the site of the Broussard murders, a message had been left in pencil, reading "When he maketh the inquisition for blood, he forgetteth not the cry of the humble", an incorrect paraphrase of Psalms 9:12, as written in the novel Uncle Tom's Cabin, as well as "Human Five", possibly as a signature.

The existence of a six-person Wexford family in Crowley is disputed altogether, as they would exceed the known 35 victim count reported in court and most media. No direct report of the murders exists, being first mentioned by the El Paso Herald in March 1912, in a sensationalist article that invents several crime scene details not mentioned in other reports or by police, saying the Wexford murders occurred "two months ago". "Wexford" was most likely a corruption of "Warner" and thus the "Wexford family murders" are mentioned through reprint in other newspapers afterwards. Despite this, McLaughlin quotes the contents of the article as fact in his thesis.

Other murders linked to Barnabet and the "Church of Sacrifice". In the case of the Opelousas murders, the family were also slashed with a knife, while the Burton family had cleavers embedded into their backs:

- November 13, 1909, in Rayne, Louisiana: Edna/Edmee Opelousas and her three children (4–9): 4 killed
- March 27, 1912, in Glidden, Texas: Ellen Monroe (46), four of her fourteen children, Willie (16), Dewey (12), Jessie (11) and Alberta (8), and lodger Lyle Finucane (37); 6 killed
- April 11, 1912, in San Antonio, Texas: William Burton, Carrie Burton (née Evers), their two children, Sonny and Leona, and Carrie's brother Leon Evers; 5 killed
- April 12, 1912, in Hempstead, Texas: Alice Marshall and two of her children; 3 killed, 3 injured
- November 23, 1912, in Philadelphia, Mississippi: William Esley/Walmsley, Sallie Esley/Walsmely and their four-year-old daughter; 3 killed

Two alleged attacks, both targeting mixed race families in their houses in San Antonio, occurred in 1912. In May, a family of five was attacked, but none were killed. On August 16, James Dashiell shot at a home invader after he heard his wife Lula (née Fitzgerald) scream when the intruder hit her with an ax as she slept, injuring her arm and foot. Dashiell and three of his children were unharmed.

== Other arrests ==
Clementine's father Raymond, as well as her siblings Zepherin and Pauline, were held on suspicion of participating in the murders, but all were released due to lack of evidence. Through Zepherin's confession, three people were arrested as alleged members of the Church of Sacrifice, a man named Ute Thomas of Port Barre in Eunice, and a man named Mac Thomas along with a woman named "Duce", both of Lafayette, in New Iberia. Zepherin alleged that Mac Thomas had acted as a getaway driver and participated in the Andrus murders, claiming he had also returned to the crime scene to get a "pipe" used in a ritual. Police arrested another Christ's Sanctified Holy Church preacher named Thompson, and accused of having "converted many negroes to the 'sacrifice sect'".

Three days after the Opelousas murders, police arrested the Washington family, consisting of husband and wife George and America, and their adult daughter Estelle, as they were the owners of the axe used in the killings. Estelle Washington and Opelousas had been "rival[s] for the affections" of a local man and were recently in court after Washington was accused of assaulting Opelousas. George Washington provided an alibi. On November 25, 1909, Houston Goodwill was arrested by police as the perpetrator of the Opelousas murders.

In February, 1911, the Jackson brothers were separately arrested for the murder of the Byers family.

Directly after the Andrus family murders, 27-year-old Gaston Godfrey, an African-American inmate at Pineville Asylum who had escaped a day earlier, was initially arrested, but later released. Another suspect, also black, could not be located.

Sosthene Guidry was arrested on March 24, 1911, and charged with the ax murder of three families. The cases are not specified except that they took place in "September 1909" in Rayne, "a few months ago" near Crowley and "recently" in Lafayette. Relation to the Guidry family whom Clementine Barnabet lived with is unknown, though unlikely, as "Guidry" is an extremely common surname in Louisiana.

Eliza Richards was arrested on January 27, 1912, on suspicion of having knowledge of the perpetrators behind the Broussard family murders.

On January 28, 1912, during the statewide crackdown on those associated with the Church of Sacrifice, two men, identified only as Snyder and "Snap", were arrested in Glenmora. Both were reportedly members of the Church of Sacrifice.

In early 1912, Jim Fields was arrested on suspicion of committing some of the ax murders attributed to Barnabet in Texas. The murders continued during his time in jail. Fields was indicted on May 17, with his trial lasting between May 20 and May 27. It was noted that Fields received a poor court-appointed defense, Gus Miller and Chris Grobe, as this was only Miller's second case and Grobe was excused for being "deathly ill". Charles K. Quin became Grobe's last second replacement and is credited with getting Fields found not guilty by emphasising that all evidence against his client was circumstantial.

On April 3, 1912, Joseph Thibodeaux was detained after he was accused of being the "hoodoo doctor" who sold the "conjure bags" to Barnabet. Thibodeaux initially denied knowing anything about hoodoo, but after being identified as the seller by Barnabet, he admitted to "practisising medicine to some extent and curing illness with herbs, roots, and incantations".

On June 10, 1912, a man was arrested for selling tablets he dubbed "Paradise Pills" in Lafayette and held on suspicions that he knew of the ax murders. The suspect gave his as J.S. Anderson, but was identified as S.W. Goodman, a Baptist minister who escaped custody in the Huntsville Unit in San Antonio, Texas.

On November 6, 1912, Zepherin Barnabet was again arrested and charged with "lying in wait and stabbing with intent to murder" for injuring Walter Caffery on November 2, 1912. Two others, Zepherin's brother Noah Barnabet and Severin Giroaurd, were also wanted for the attempted murder.

=== Related deaths ===
Due to increased fears about the supposed "Ax-Man" in Texas, there was heightened vigilance among both state authorities and black citizens, the latter seeing a sharp increase gun ownership, as a precaution against home invasions. As a result, there were deaths and attempted lynchings related to suspected "Ax-Man" activity across the state between 1911 and 1912. In Smithville, teenage boy Max Warren, who had a history of sleepwalking, was shot by his neighbor West Duval, who had been standing guard outside the house that night. In Gonzales, a woman was forced out of town due to rumors of a "strange Negro woman missionary" claimed to be affiliated with the Church of Sacrifice. In Acadian regions of Louisiana, there was an increased demand for protective "charms" and amid a high of self-proclaimed "hoodoo doctors", Lake Charles Police Department mounted officer Ira E. Barker shot and killed A.E. Johnson, a "lightning-rod salesman" from Opelousas, after the intoxicated Johnson became belligerent during questioning.

== Modern assessment ==
Modern analysts have tended to doubt Barnabet's involvement in the murders. In their 2017 book The Man from the Train, authors Bill James and Rachel McCarthy James argue that some, but not all, of the murders were part of a larger series of killings perpetrated by an itinerant worker named Paul Mueller, with others committed by copycats. Other than the fact that she had purchased conjure bags from a specific person, they write, "nothing that Clementine said about the murders (a) can be confirmed by any other party, or (b) has the ring of truth about it. A great deal of what she said is demonstrably false."

== See also ==
- Axeman of New Orleans
- Billy the Axeman
- List of serial killers in the United States
- List of serial killers by number of victims
