= Josiah B. and Sara Moore House =

Historic house in Iowa, United States

- U.S. National Register of Historic Places
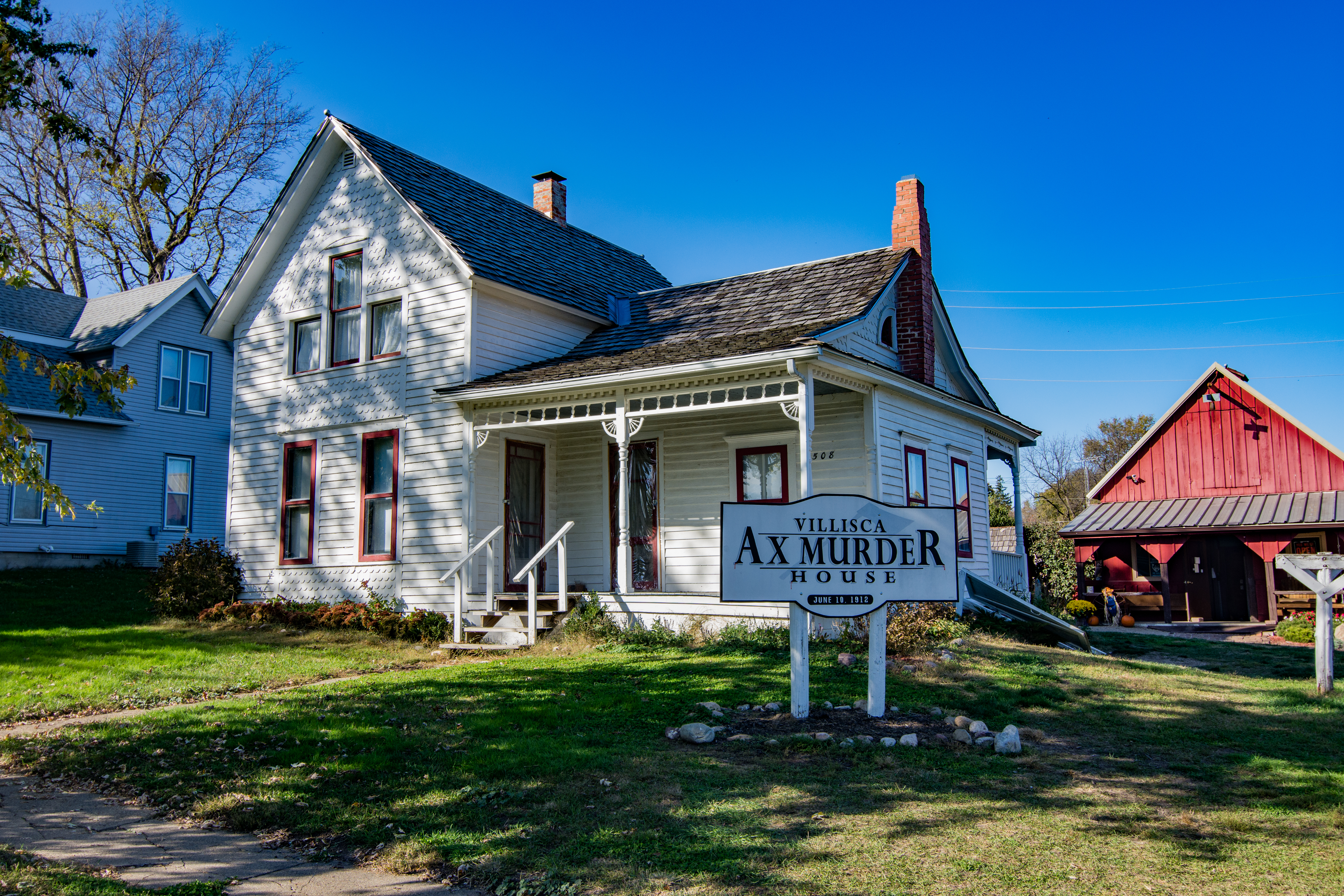
- Renovated Moore family house as of 2016

- Location within Iowa Location within the United States
- Interactive map showing the Moore House’s location
- Location: 508 E. Second St. Villisca, Iowa
- Coordinates: 40°55′50″N 94°58′24″W
- Built: 1867
- Architectural style: Queen Anne
- NRHP reference No.: 97001471
- Added to NRHP: December 1, 1997

The Josiah B. and Sara Moore House is a house in Villisca, Iowa, United States. The house was the site of the 1912 brutal murder of eight people, including children. A documentary has been made about the murder, which remains unsolved. The house was renovated in the 1990s and is known as the Villisca Axe Murder House.

== History ==
The house was constructed in 1868. The house is a wood-frame building with a gable-front-and-wing plan and is a modest interpretation of the Queen Anne style.

Josiah Moore and his family bought the house in 1903 and lived there until 1912. On the night of June 9, 1912, the six members of the Moore family and two house guests were bludgeoned to death in the residence. All eight victims, including six children, had severe head wounds inflicted with an axe.

Over the next 90 years, the house at 508 E. 2nd Street had thirteen owners. Among them was the Villisca State Savings and Loan (1963 to 1971), possibly assumed as a foreclosure. The house experienced long periods of vacancy, and was a rental property in the 1960s and 1970s. It had fallen into disrepair by the time it was acquired by Rick and Vicki Sprague on New Year’s Eve in 1994.

Sometime between 1936 and 1994, the house underwent quite numerous changes. The front and back porches were closed in, plumbing and electricity were added and the outbuildings were removed or replaced.

== Renovation ==
A few months after acquiring the property, Rick and Vicki Sprague approached local real estate agent and historian Darwin Linn about purchasing it. Linn, who co-owned the Olson-Linn Museum with his wife, Martha, subsequently acquired the house from the Spragues. Once Martha recovered from the shock of learning she was now co-owner of one of the most notorious homes in America, the two historians set about getting the funds to restore to the home to its original condition at the time of the murders.

The Linns used historical photographs and interviews with neighbors to determine the houses earlier appearance. They removed vinyl siding and undertook the painstaking efforts of restoring and repainting the original exterior wood. They stripped the home’s functional plumbing features and electrical fixtures. They removed the front and back patio enclosures and restored the outhouse and chicken coop in the backyard. The pantry had been converted to an indoor bathroom, which was removed and converted back into a pantry. The restoration was intended to bring it back to its 1912 appearance.

In 1997, the house was added to the National Register of Historic Places. The Iowa Historic Preservation Alliance recognized the site with the Preservation at its Best award in 1997.

The Linns opened the house to the public in the late 1900's offering daytime tours and overnight stays. Tours included information about the period, the murders, and the information that followed.

== Background ==
In the early 2000s, the Linns attempted to compile a list of all the property's former tenants, but records were incomplete due to frequent turnover among renters.

On November 7, 2014, a 37 year old visitor from Wisconsin suffered self-inflicted stab wounds while visiting the house as part of a paranormal investigation. He was transported to an hospital in Omaha for treatment.

== Haunting claims ==
According to local lore, a tenant living in the house during the 1960s reportedly saw a flash of light while preparing dinner in the kitchen, became disoriented, and subsequently found a knife lodged in his hand. The family reportedly moved out shortly afterward.

Visitors to the house have reported alleged paranormal activity. During overnight investigations in 2020 and 2022, People editor Julie Jordan and her companions reported motion detectors activating without an apparent cause, unexplained battery drainage, and an electronic voice recording that they interpreted as a child’s voice.

== See also ==
- National Register of Historic Places listings in Montgomery County, Iowa
- National Register of Historic Places listings in Iowa
