= Kerf (sculpture) =

Sculpture in Portland, Oregon

- One of the sculptures in June 2017
- Artist: Thomas Sayre
- Year: 2015
- Type: Sculpture
- Medium: Concrete
- Location: Portland, Oregon, United States; 45.46268°N 122.63721°W

Kerf is an outdoor series of two pigmented cast concrete sculptures by Thomas Sayre, installed at the MAX Orange Line's Southeast Tacoma/Johnson Creek station in the southeast Portland, Oregon portion of the Ardenwald-Johnson Creek neighborhood, which straddles the border between Portland (and Multnomah County) and Milwaukie, Oregon (and Clackamas County).

According to TriMet, the pieces were "earth-cast" on site and represent "the influence of wheels on the area, from a 19th-century sawmill on Johnson Creek to the wheels of the MAX train".

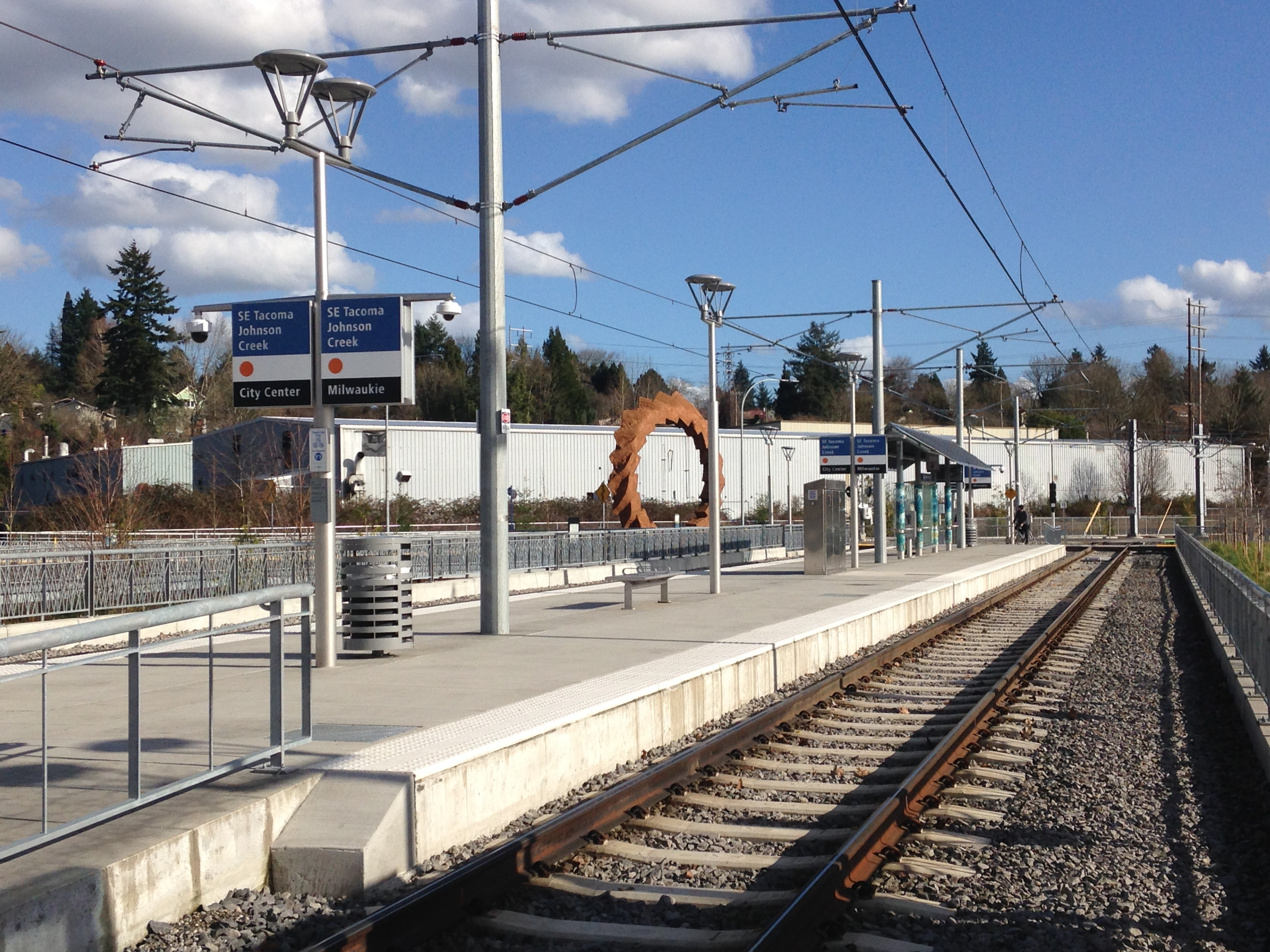
The sculpture behind the Southeast Tacoma/Johnson Creek station, March 2016

== See also ==
- 2015 in art
