= The Man from the Train =

2017 American true crime book

The Man from the Train: The Solving of a Century-Old Serial Killer Mystery
- Author: Bill James, Rachel McCarthy James
- Language: English
- Subject: True crime
- Publisher: Scribner
- Publication date: September 19, 2017
- ISBN: 978-1-4767-9625-3 (hardcover)

The Man from the Train is a 2017 true crime book written by Bill James and his daughter Rachel McCarthy James.

In The Man from the Train, the authors claim to have discovered the identity and existence of a previously overlooked serial killer active in the late 1800s and early 1900s. According to the authors, this criminal was named Paul Mueller, who operated throughout North America and killed a minimum of 59 people and possibly over 100. In the early 1900s some of these crimes were attributed to a suspected killer known as Billy the Axeman, but the authors suggest the killer was responsible for a wider range of crimes than earlier thought.

Bill James is best known as a baseball analyst using sabermetrics, but also writes about crime, having previously published Popular Crime: Reflections on the Celebration of Violence (2012).

== Summary ==
Bill James's research began with an attempt to solve one famous unsolved crime, the Villisca axe murders, in which a family of six and two house guests were slaughtered in Villisca, Iowa, on the night of June 9, 1912. James suspected a possible serial killer on the basis of what seemed the actions of a practiced criminal at Villisca. He found some similar crimes in period newspapers and brought on his daughter Rachel McCarthy James, who found more. McCarthy James was originally hired as a research assistant, but by her own estimate wrote roughly ten percent of the book and thus was credited as a co-author.

By means of research in newspaper archives the Jameses discovered scores of murders of entire families, committed from 1898 to 1912. These crimes, some of which they ascribe to Mueller, occurred in Nova Scotia, Oregon, Kansas, Florida, Arkansas, and other locations. Though many of these crimes earned significant publicity, they have mostly faded from attention apart from the Villisca murders.

Mueller's name was apparently linked to only one crime in contemporary media. He was the subject of an unsuccessful yearlong manhunt as the sole suspect in the 1898 murder of a family near West Brookfield, Massachusetts, who had employed him as a farmhand. According to Rachel McCarthy James, she and her father unearthed "probably 500 words of material about Mueller, specifically his physical appearance, where he's from, his skills and his family." Mueller was about 35 years old in 1897, reportedly claimed to be a German military veteran, and was known as a skilled carpenter who spoke very little English. He was described as short and muscular in stature, with unusually small and widely spaced teeth his most distinctive feature. Mueller is believed to most likely have worked as an itinerant lumberjack, given his woodworking skills, the killer's use of an axe, and the fact that most of the murders occurred in or near logging areas.

The Jameses point out that in these times, local police usually assumed a local murderer with some connection to the victims. The concept of murder committed by a traveling stranger was never even considered in most cases, which led to a serial murderer possibly being missed. Police investigative methods and technology were primitive compared to those of a few decades later (e.g., neither fingerprints nor blood typing were in wide use when the crimes began), and crime scenes were often compromised by curious onlookers. The authors believe that, because of Mueller's crimes, at least eight people were wrongly convicted (four of whom were executed and one later exonerated), seven were lynched (most but not all African Americans), and ten more were arrested but later released for lack of evidence or strong alibis.

According to the Jameses, a number of murders in the period which were assumed by local police to be one-off incidents were actually committed by a single person, probably Mueller, because of about thirty similarities featuring in most of these crimes. These include crime scenes within a short walk from a railroad junction where Mueller was suspected to have fled by freighthopping (thus the book's title); the slaughter of entire families late at night in small towns with little or no police force; the families having a barn where the killer was believed to have hidden to observe the families; the families having no dog to warn of an intruder; the killer's using the blunt edge of an axe as a murder weapon; the killer's leaving the axe in plain sight; the killer's covering victims with sheets or blankets prior to the murders (probably to prevent blood spatter); the killer's moving or stacking bodies after the murders; the killer's covering windows from inside the house with sheets or towels; and the absence of robbery with cash or jewelry undisturbed at the scene. The killer often attempted arson, apparently to destroy the house, in early cases, but gradually abandoned the practice possibly because it more quickly brought attention to the scene. A killer or killers known as the Axeman of New Orleans was active in 1918 and 1919, but the authors believe these crimes are unconnected to Mueller, as the crime scenes differed (e.g. the New Orleans victims were all adults and were killed with the blade of an ax). However, the authors believe some of the 1911–1912 murders attributed to Clementine Barnabet were likely committed by Mueller.

The killer's primary motive is believed to have been a sadistic sexual attraction to prepubescent girls, factoring in a majority of the killings. While adults were typically ambushed and murdered in bed while sleeping, girls often showed defense wounds or other evidence of struggle. Media reports of the crimes often included veiled references to the killer's having ejaculated at the crime scenes or his having molested the girls after death. The presence of a slab of bacon at the Villisca scene, possibly used as a masturbation aid, may bolster this theory, according to the authors. As a similar criminal who killed an entire family out of an obsession with a young girl, James cites Dennis Rader (also known as the BTK Killer), whose first known murders of a family of four in 1974 were strongly motivated by his fixation on the family's 11-year-old daughter.

Bill James noted how, nationwide from 1890 to 1912, there were on average eight families murdered per year, most of which do not share the characteristics reported in media for the crimes attributed to Mueller. Furthermore, crimes with the collection of 30 traits listed above stopped abruptly after 1912. A statistician in his baseball work, James contends it is more likely the crimes fitting the Mueller profile are connected than not because of the idiosyncratic characteristics. A lack of such crimes anywhere in the nation for about a year in 1908 lead the Jameses to speculate the killer was apprehended and imprisoned for a minor crime.

The authors describe themselves as feeling certain Mueller committed 14 family murders totaling 59 victims. They are less certain, to varying degrees, of his involvement in 25 further such murders totaling an additional 95 victims. If accurate, these totals would place Mueller/The Man from The Train either just behind or ahead of Samuel Little, the American serial killer with the most confirmed victims, who was convicted of 60 murders and claimed 93.

Improved communication technology and advances in police science allowed observers increasingly to note similarities among crimes occurring in different locations. Nationwide attention came following the brazen 1911 murder of two families in a single night in Colorado Springs, Colorado, and a similar family murder weeks afterward a few hundred miles away in neighboring Kansas. By the 1912 Villisca murders, it was widely suspected that a single traveling assailant might be to blame (though the term "serial killer" was not used until decades later).

The authors also suggest Mueller may have been responsible for the unsolved 1922 Hinterkaifeck murders in Germany. The murders bear some similarities to the U.S. crimes, including the slaughter of an entire family in their isolated home, the bodies' being moved after the killings, a young girl among the victims, use of the blunt edge of a farm tool (a mattock) as a weapon, and the apparent absence of robbery as a motive. The authors suspect that Mueller, described as a German immigrant in contemporary media, may have departed the US for his homeland after private investigators and journalists began to notice and publicize patterns in the American crimes.

== Reception ==
In a review for The New York Journal of Books, Bill McClug described The Man from the Train as "an interesting and fascinating albeit rather unknown story, and it is commendable that the authors have chosen to bring it to light." But he also criticized the writing style as overly casual and thought it unlikely that the Jameses' case could be conclusively proved after a century.

Kirkus Reviews gave the book a positive review: "Told in workmanlike, journalistic prose with plenty of personal injections—'hear me out. Have I got a story to tell you'—the narrative becomes addictive, and it's easy to get caught up in the elaborate search and the authors' conclusions, which are plausible."

In a blurb on the dust jacket for the book's hardcover edition, professor Harold Schechter states the Jameses offered the most plausible explanation to date for the Villisca murders.

== See also ==
- List of serial killers in the United States
