= Ardenwald-Johnson Creek, Portland, Oregon =

Neighborhood in the state of Oregon, United States

Ardenwald-Johnson Creek
- Neighborhood
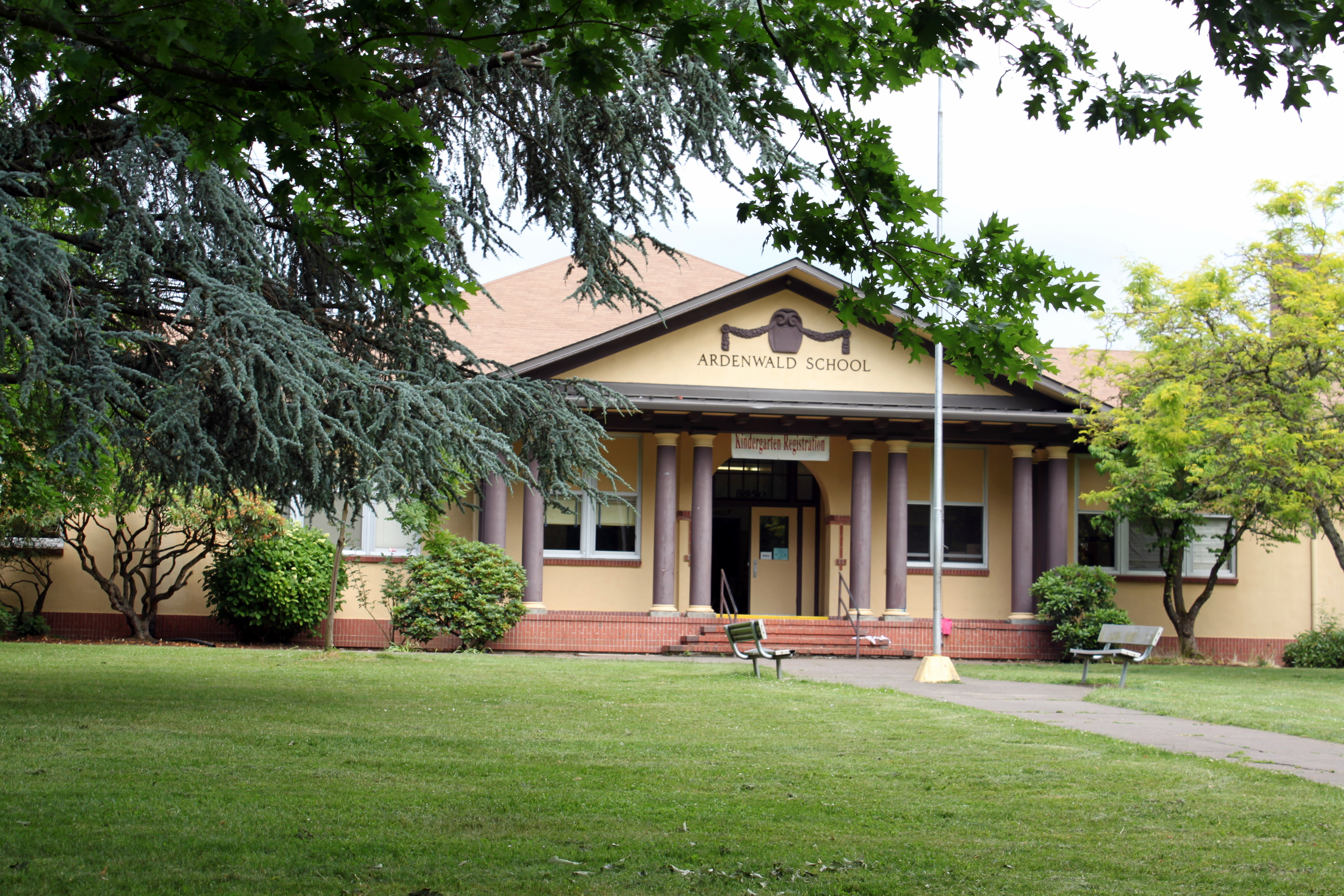
- Ardenwald School

- Flag
- Interactive map of Ardenwald-Johnson Creek
- Coordinates: 45°27′19″N 122°37′47″W
- Country: United States
- State: Oregon
- City: Portland and Milwaukie, Oregon

Government
  - Association: Ardenwald-Johnson Creek Neighborhood Association
  - Coalition: Southeast Uplift

Population (2020)
  - Total: 4,706

Ardenwald-Johnson Creek (also called simply Ardenwald) is a neighborhood straddling the border between Portland (and Multnomah County) and Milwaukie (and Clackamas County), Oregon. It is recognized by both Portland's Office of Neighborhood Involvement as well as Milwaukie's Neighborhoods Program.

== History ==
Ardenwald was named in 1888 for Arden M. Rockwood, whose father platted the community. The last syllable of Rockwood is rendered in German and spliced onto the first name. The neighborhood is centered around Ardenwald Elementary School.

The Tideman Johnson Natural Area (1940) is located along Johnson Creek in Ardenwald. Springwater Corridor Trail borders Johnson Creek, crossing along the north side of Ardenwald. The Ardenwald neighborhood has two access points for this 21-mile bike trail between Portland and Boring, found at the north end of SE 28th Avenue and from the Johnson Creek Boulevard Trailhead (where the trail crosses the road).

Ardenwald was featured along the 8-mile loop of the 2017 Sellwood-Milwaukie Sunday Parkways, an annual 1-day event where streets are closed to vehicle traffic.

The community puts on a summer concert series in Ardenwald Park, next to Ardenwald Elementary School. Water Tower Park features a unique play area along 40th Avenue. An area of undeveloped lots, between SE 32nd Avenue, SE Roswell Street, and SE Barba Street, are widely used as an unofficial dog park for the neighborhood. The neighborhood's newest park, Balfour Park is located on Balfour Street off SE 32nd Ave and is currently undeveloped.

Providence Milwaukie Hospital is located at the south end of Ardenwald at 10150 SE 32nd Avenue.

== Gallery ==
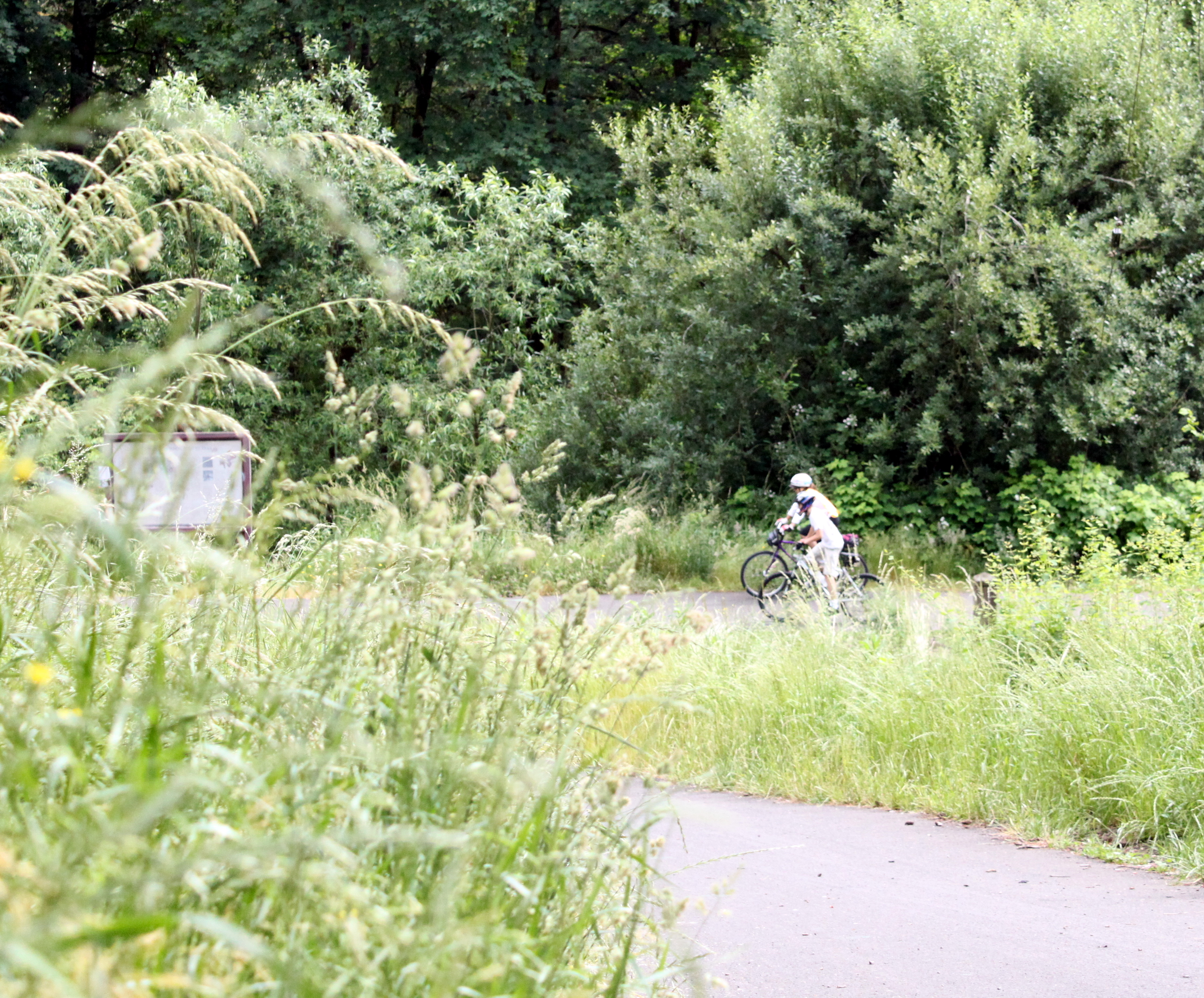
Bicycles in Tideman Johnson Natural Area

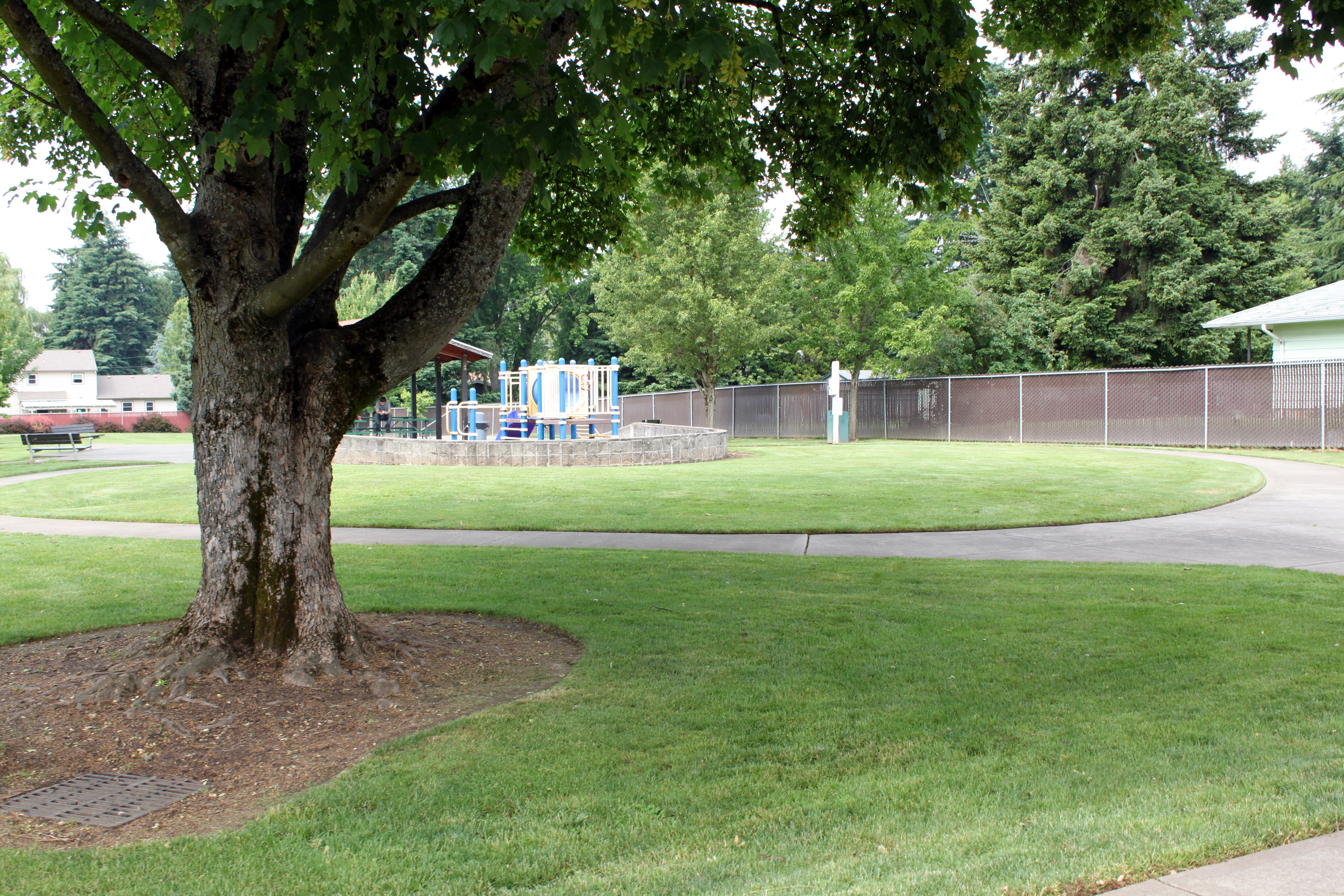
Ardenwald Park

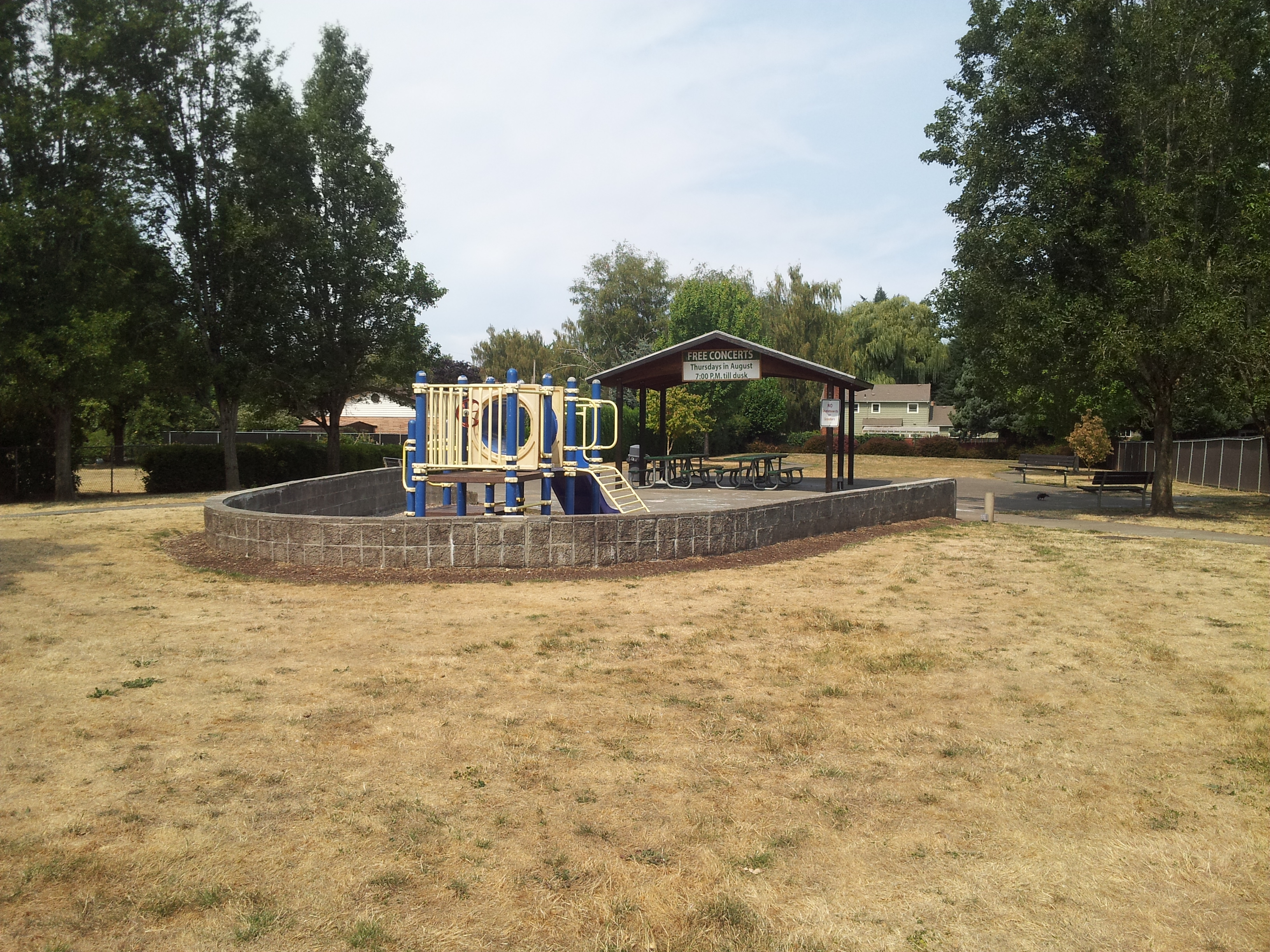
Ardenwald Park

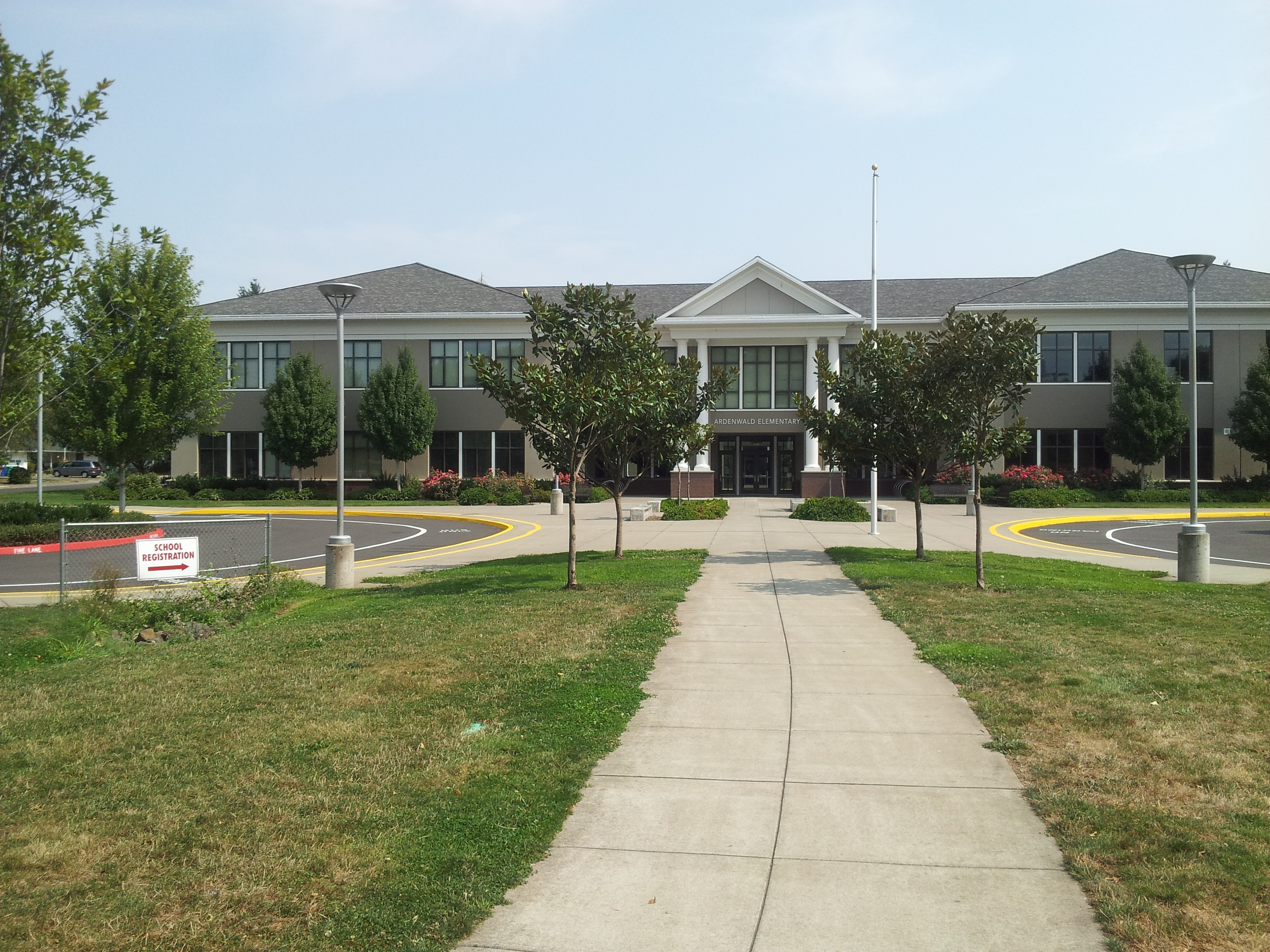
Ardenwald Elementary School

== Community events ==
Each August, the neighborhood hosts a summer concert series in Ardenwald Park every Thursday night.

Each October, the Halloween decorations at "Davis Graveyard" draw crowds of onlookers to SE 43rd Ave. to view the spooky (and silly) tombstones and Cathedral facade. The street is closed in front of Davis Graveyard during an open house and on Halloween night.

== Transportation ==
The Ardenwald-Johnson Creek Neighborhood is connected to the TriMet mass transit system through bus lines as well as the light rail Orange Line at the Southeast Tacoma/Johnson Creek station near the western boundary of the neighborhood.

== See also ==
- Southeast Tacoma/Johnson Creek station
  - Kerf (sculpture), public art installed at the station
