= SW 6th & Madison and City Hall/SW 5th & Jefferson stations =

Light rail stations in Portland, Oregon, U.S.

SW 6th & MadisonCity Hall SW 5th & Jefferson
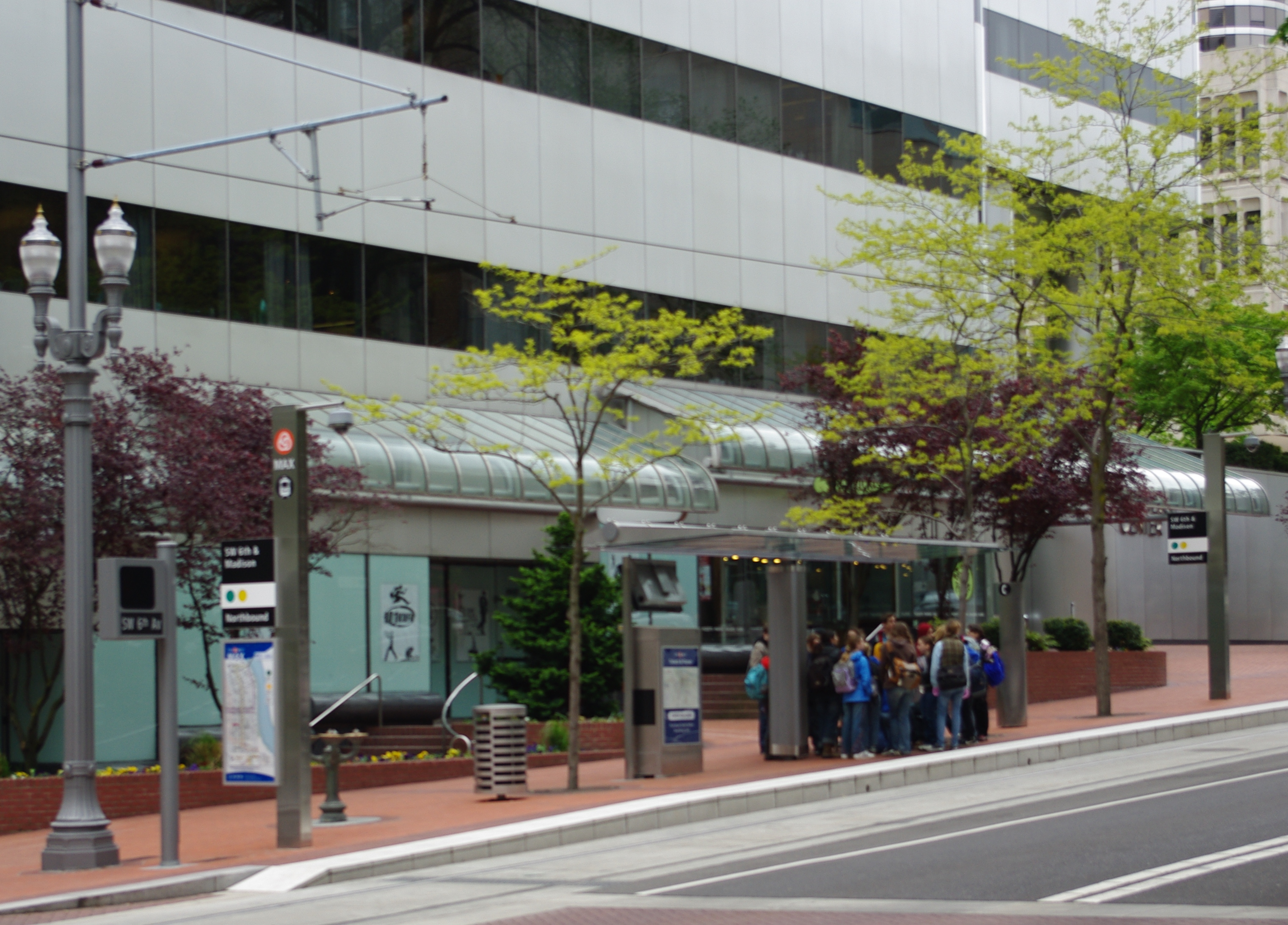
- 6th and Madison Street platform

General information
- Location: SW 6th & Madison (northbound); SW 5th and Jefferson (southbound)
- Coordinates: 45°30′55″N 122°40′48″W
- Owner: TriMet
- Tracks: 1 per split
- Connections: Portland Transit Mall; 4, 6, 10, 14, 19, 55, 96

Construction
- Accessible: yes

History
- Opened: August 2009

Services
Preceding station	TriMet	Following station
SW 6th & Madison Street
PSU Urban Center/SW 6th & Montgomery One-way operation	Yellow Line	Pioneer Courthouse/SW 6th toward Expo Center
City Hall/SW 5th & Jefferson Street
PSU Urban Center/SW 5th & Mill toward SE Park Ave	Orange Line	Pioneer Place/SW 5th One-way operation
Former services
Preceding station	TriMet	Following station
SW 6th & Madison Street
PSU Urban Center/SW 6th & Montgomery One-way operation	Green Line 2009–2026	Pioneer Courthouse/SW 6th toward Clackamas Town Center Transit Center
PSU Urban Center/SW 6th & Montgomery One-way operation	Portland Vintage Trolley 2009-2014	Pioneer Courthouse/SW 6th toward Union Station/NW 6th & Hoyt
PSU Urban Center/SW 6th & Montgomery One-way operation	Mall Shuttle 2009–2011	Pioneer Courthouse/SW 6th toward Union Station/NW 6th & Hoyt
City Hall/SW 5th & Jefferson Street
PSU Urban Center/SW 5th & Mill toward PSU South/SW 5th & Jackson	Green Line 2009–2026	Pioneer Place/SW 5th One-way operation
PSU Urban Center/SW 5th & Mill toward PSU South/SW 5th & Jackson	Yellow Line 2009–2015	Pioneer Place/SW 5th One-way operation
PSU Urban Center/SW 5th & Mill toward PSU South/SW 5th & Jackson	Portland Vintage Trolley 2009-2014	Pioneer Place/SW 5th One-way operation
PSU Urban Center/SW 5th & Mill Terminus	Mall Shuttle 2009–2011	Pioneer Place/SW 5th One-way operation
Location

SW 6th & Madison and City Hall/SW 5th & Jefferson are a pair of light rail stations on the MAX Orange and Yellow Lines in Portland, Oregon. It is the fifth stop southbound on the Portland Transit Mall extension. As of August 2026, the Green Line was cut back to Gateway Transit Center and no longer serves either station.

The stations are built into the sidewalks of 5th and 6th Avenues, with the 5th Avenue platform heading southbound and the 6th Avenue platform northbound. They are located at the base of the PacWest Center. Points of interest include the Wells Fargo Center, the Portland Building, Portland City Hall, and other numerous government buildings in Downtown Portland. The station serves all bus lines on 5th Avenue and 19–Glisan/Canyon Rd, 55-Hamilton and 96–Boones Ferry Rd. The stop ID number for the bus stop is 12791. On 5th Ave, lines FX2-Division, 4-Fessenden/Woodstock, 9-Powell Blvd, 17–Hogate/NE 33rd, are one block away from the station. The stop ID number for this bus stop is 7594.

When opened on August 30, 2009, the stations were located in Fareless Square (within fare zone 1), which was renamed the Free Rail Zone four months later, in January 2010. However, the fare-free zone was eliminated in 2012, when TriMet discontinued all use of fare zones.
