= Clinton St/SE 12th Ave station =

Light rail station in Portland, Oregon, U.S.

Clinton St/SE 12th Ave
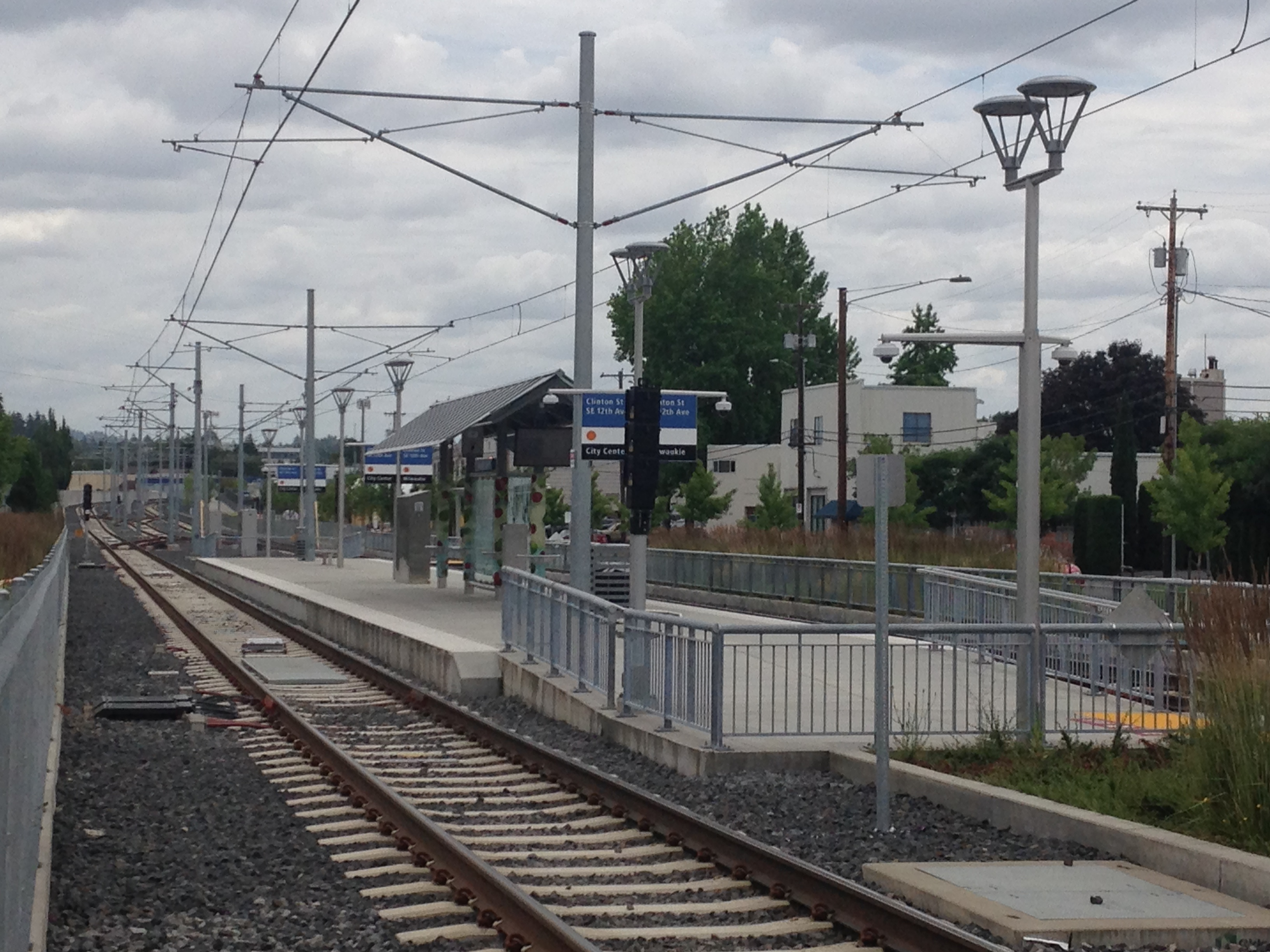
- Clinton Street/Southeast 12th Avenue station platform in May 2016

General information
- Location: 1229 SE Gideon Street; Portland, Oregon; U.S.
- Coordinates: 45°30′11″N 122°39′13″W
- Owner: TriMet
- Line: South Corridor
- Platforms: 1 island platform
- Tracks: 2
- Connections: TriMet: 4, 9, 17

Construction
- Cycle facilities: 52 bike rack spaces
- Accessible: Yes

History
- Opened: September 12, 2015

Services
Preceding station	TriMet	Following station
Southeast 17th Avenue and Rhine Street toward SE Park Ave	Orange Line	OMSI/SE Water toward PSU South/SW 6th & College
Location

Clinton Street/Southeast 12th Avenue station is a MAX Orange Line station located at 1229 Southeast Gideon Street in Portland, Oregon's Hosford-Abernethy neighborhood, in the United States. The sculpture Intersection is installed at the station.

== Bus service ==
As of August 23, 2026, this station is served by the following bus lines:

- 4–Fessenden/Woodstock
- 9–Powell Blvd
- 17–Holgate/NE 33rd

Discontinued 8/23/26

- 19–Woodstock/Glisan (Glisan segment reassigned to 58-Canyon Rd)
