= SE 17th Ave & Holgate Blvd station =

Light rail station in Portland, Oregon, U.S.

SE 17th Ave & Holgate Blvd
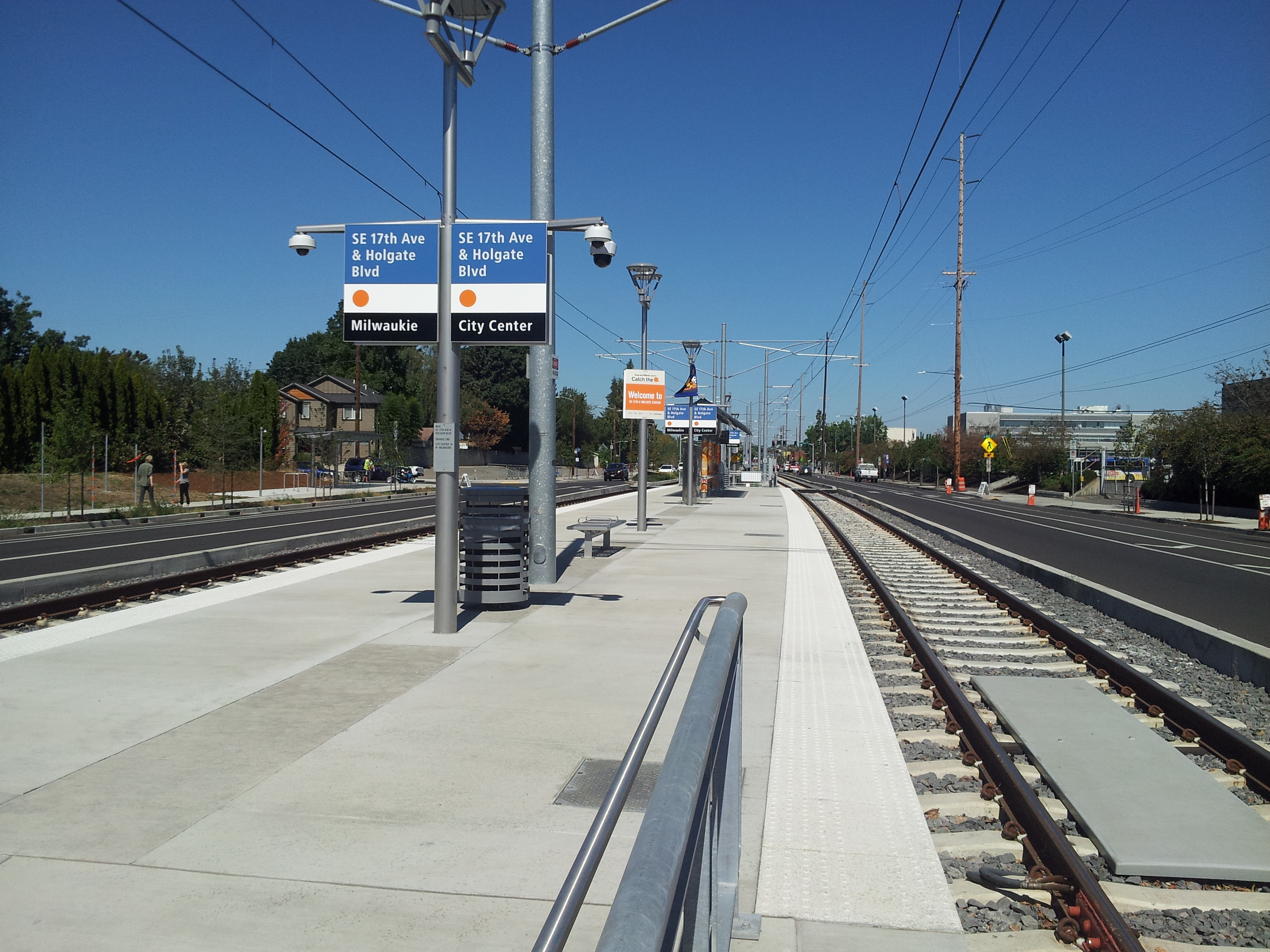
- Platform at SE 17th & Holgate looking north

General information
- Location: 4410 SE 17th Avenue; Portland, Oregon, United States
- Coordinates: 45°29′28″N 122°38′54″W
- Owner: TriMet
- Platforms: 1 island platform
- Tracks: 2
- Bus routes: 1
- Bus operators: TriMet
- Connections: 17

Construction
- Cycle facilities: 16 rack spaces
- Accessible: yes

History
- Opened: September 12, 2015

Services
Preceding station	TriMet	Following station
SE Bybee Blvd toward SE Park Ave	Orange Line	SE 17th Ave & Rhine St toward PSU South/SW 6th & College
Location

Southeast 17th Avenue and Holgate Boulevard is a MAX Orange Line station located in the median of Southeast 17th Avenue at Holgate Boulevard in the Brooklyn neighborhood of Portland, Oregon.

== Bus service ==
As of August 23, 2026, this station is served by the following bus lines:

- 17 - Holgate/NE 33rd

Discontinued 5/28/23

- 70 - 12th/NE 33rd Ave (rerouted to Ladd's Addition)

== See also ==
- Passage (sculpture), installed along the MAX Orange Line
- Tri It, a nearby mural
