= To Grandmother's House =

Sculpture in Oak Grove, Oregon, U.S.

- The sculpture in 2019
- Artist: Patrick Gracewood
- Year: 2015
- Type: Sculpture
- Medium: Atlas cedar, paint, weathering steel
- Location: Oak Grove, Oregon, United States; 45.430691°N 122.635486°W

To Grandmother's House is an outdoor wooden sculpture by Patrick Gracewood, installed near the Southeast Park Avenue station in Oak Grove, an unincorporated area neighboring Milwaukie in Clackamas County, Oregon, in the United States. It depicts an older woman holding a rabbit in her arms and was carved from a 75-year-old cedar tree, cut down for the construction of the MAX Orange Line, over three years. The sculpture was installed on April 29, 2015.

== Description and history ==
Portland artist Patrick Gracewood's To Grandmother's House is installed near the MAX Orange Line's Southeast Park Avenue MAX Station. Carved from a 75-year-old Atlas cedar tree over three years, the sculpture depicts an older woman holding a rabbit in her arms. Additional materials include paint and weathering steel. It was inspired by a photograph Gracewood took years before of his friend's German grandmother. The sculpture was installed on April 29, 2015, as the last of six artworks commissioned by TriMet near the MAX station, each created from trees cleared for the Orange Line. Engineers set the piece on a cement pedestal, then placed it under a metal "treehouse", or a canopy shaped like a tree. According to Gracewood, To Grandmother's House "honors women and how they often hold communities together".

== See also ==
- 2015 in art
- Rabbits and hares in art
- Rebirth (sculpture), proposed public art for the station
