= SE 17th Ave & Rhine St station =

Light rail station in Portland, Oregon, U.S.

SE 17th Ave & Rhine St
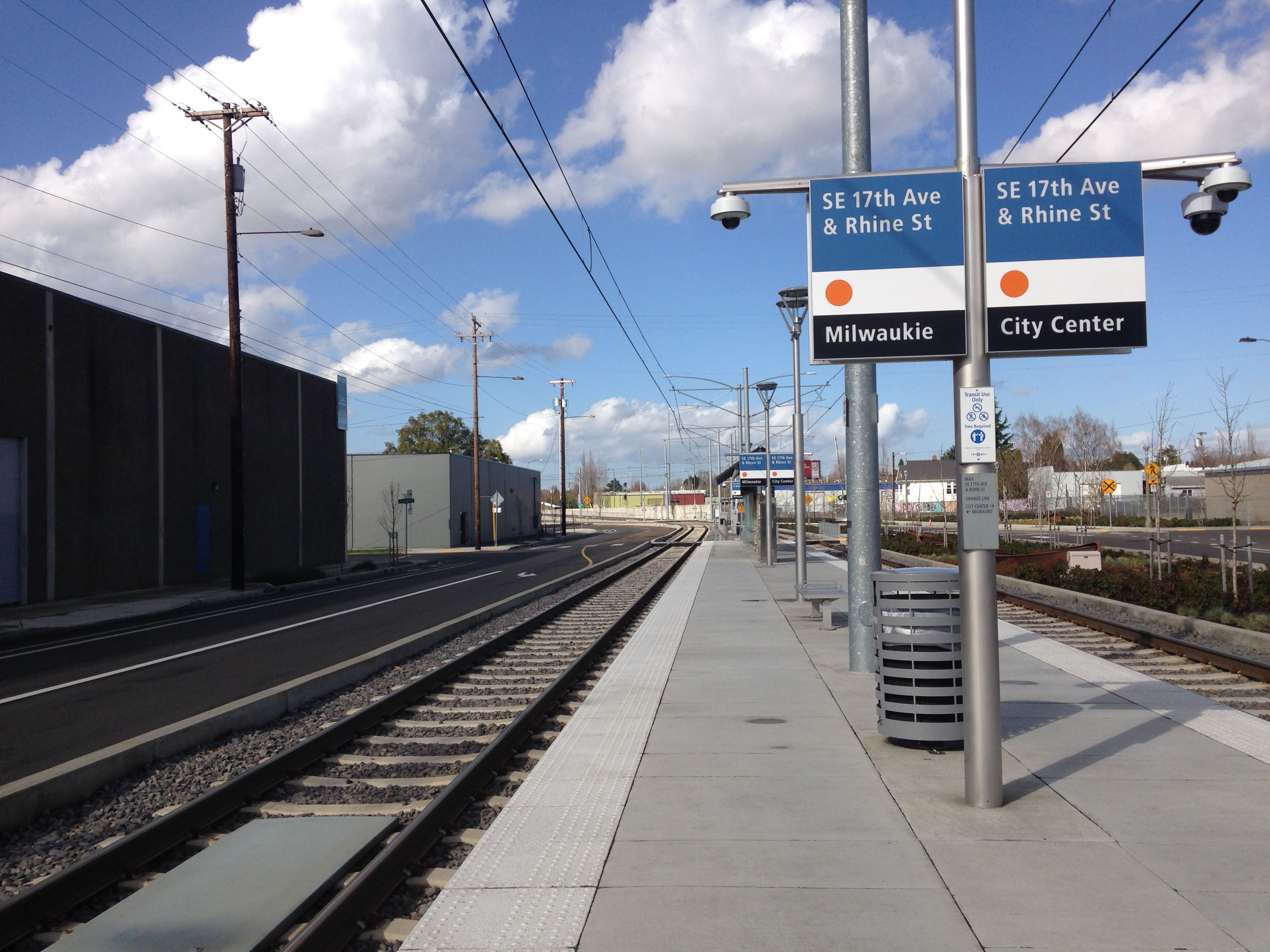

General information
- Location: 3424 SE 17th Avenue; Portland, Oregon
- Coordinates: 45°29′53″N 122°38′53″W
- Owner: TriMet
- Platforms: 1 island platform
- Tracks: 2
- Connections: 17

Construction
- Cycle facilities: 8 bike rack spaces
- Accessible: yes

History
- Opened: September 12, 2015

Services
Preceding station	TriMet	Following station
Southeast 17th Avenue and Holgate Boulevard toward SE Park Ave	Orange Line	Clinton St/SE 12th Ave toward PSU South/SW 6th & College
Location

Southeast 17th Avenue and Rhine Street is a MAX Orange Line station located at 3424 Southeast 17th Avenue in Portland, Oregon's Brooklyn neighborhood, in the United States. Along These Lines is installed near the station at the Rhine-Lafayette Pedestrian Crossing.

It is the least busy station in the MAX network, with an average of 2123 passengers per week (303 per day) during the spring of 2024.

== Bus service ==
As of August 23, 2026, this station is served by the following bus lines:

- 17-Holgate/NE 33rd
