= PSU Urban Center stations =

Light rail stations in Portland, Oregon

PSU Urban Ctr SW 6th & MontgomeryPSU Urban Ctr SW 5th & Mill
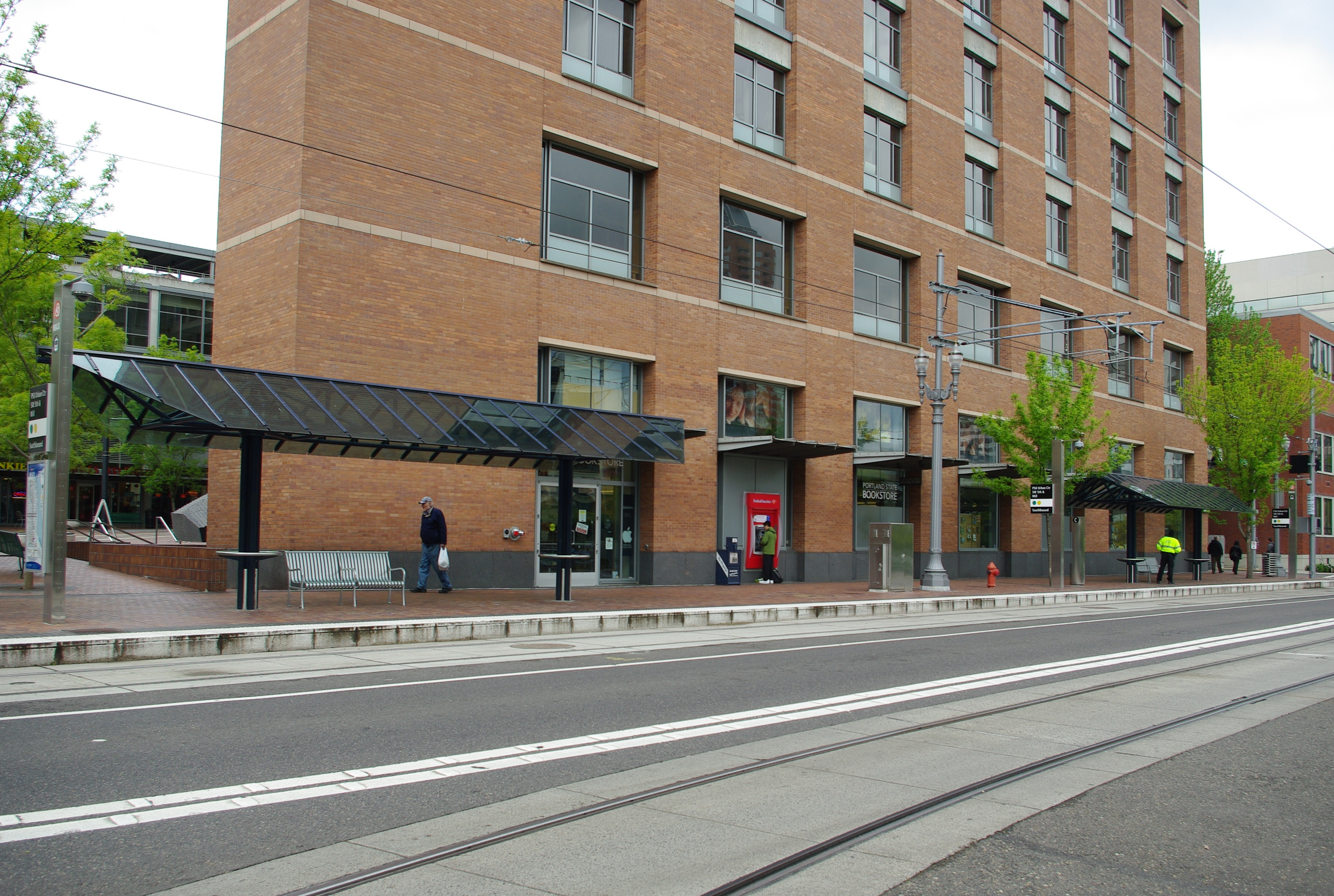
- 5th & Mill Street platform

General information
- Location: SW 6th & Montgomery (northbound); SW 5th & Mill (southbound); Portland, Oregon; United States
- Coordinates: 45°30′43″N 122°40′55″W
- Owner: TriMet
- Tracks: 1 per split
- Connections: Portland Transit Mall; 4, 9, 17, 35, 40, 44, 54; : NS Line, A and B Loop

Construction
- Accessible: yes

Other information
- Fare zone: 2009–2012: Fareless Square/Free Rail Zone (in Zone 1); 2012–present: Not applicable

History
- Opened: August 2009

Services
| Preceding station | TriMet | Following station |
|---|---|---|
SW 6th & Montgomery
| PSU South/SW 6th & College One-way operation | Yellow Line | Southwest 6th & Madison toward Expo Center |
SW 5th & Mill
| PSU South/SW 5th & Jackson toward SE Park Ave | Orange Line | City Hall/Southwest 5th & Jefferson One-way operation |
Services at nearby streetcar stop
| Preceding station | Portland Streetcar | Following station |
|---|---|---|
PSU Urban Center
| Southwest Park & Mill; One-way operation | NS Line | Southwest 3rd & Harrison towards South Lowell & Bond |
| Southwest Park & Mill; One-way operation | A Loop | Southwest 3rd & Harrison; Next clockwise |
Southwest 5th & Montgomery
| Southwest 5th & Market towards NW 23rd & Marshall | NS Line | Southwest 3rd & Harrison; One-way operation |
| Southwest 5th & Market; Next counter-clockwise | B Loop | Southwest 3rd & Harrison; One-way operation |
Former services
| Preceding station | TriMet | Following station |
|---|---|---|
SW 6th & Montgomery
| PSU South/SW 6th & College One-way operation | Green Line 2009–2026 | Southwest 6th & Madison toward Clackamas Town Center Transit Center |
| PSU South/SW 6th & College After 2012 One-way operation | Portland Vintage Trolley 2009–2014 | Southwest 6th & Madison toward Union Station/NW 6th & Hoyt |
| Terminus | Mall Shuttle 2009–2011 | Southwest 6th & Madison toward Union Station/NW 6th & Hoyt |
SW 5th & Mill
| PSU South/SW 5th & Jackson Terminus | Green Line 2009–2026 | City Hall/Southwest 5th & Jefferson One-way operation |
| PSU South/SW 5th & Jackson After 2012 Terminus | Yellow Line 2009–2015 | City Hall/Southwest 5th & Jefferson One-way operation |
| PSU South/SW 5th & Jackson After 2012 Terminus | Portland Vintage Trolley 2009–2014 | City Hall/Southwest 5th & Jefferson One-way operation |
| Terminus | Mall Shuttle 2009–2011 | City Hall/Southwest 5th & Jefferson One-way operation |
Location

The PSU Urban Center stations are a pair of light rail stations on the MAX Orange and Yellow Lines in downtown Portland, Oregon, United States, located adjacent to the PSU Urban Center, of Portland State University. The northbound station is PSU Urban Center/Southwest 6th & Montgomery station and the southbound station is PSU Urban Center/Southwest 5th & Mill station. The stations opened on August 30, 2009, and for the next three years they were temporarily the southern passenger terminus of the Portland Transit Mall MAX extension, awaiting construction of the PSU South stations. The latter opened on September 2, 2012, and the change made PSU Urban Center the second stop northbound and the next-to-last stop southbound on the Portland Mall MAX lines. As of August 2026, the Green Line was cut back to Gateway Transit Center and no longer serves either station.

The stations are built into the sidewalks of 5th and 6th Avenue. There are connections to the Portland Streetcar's NS Line and A and B Loop lines, and TriMet and C-Tran buses.

When opened in August 2009, the stations were located in Fareless Square (within fare zone 1), which was renamed the Free Rail Zone four months later, in January 2010. However, the fare-free zone was eliminated in 2012, when TriMet discontinued all use of fare zones.
