= Rhine–Lafayette Pedestrian Overpass =

Pedestrian bridge in Portland, Oregon, U.S.

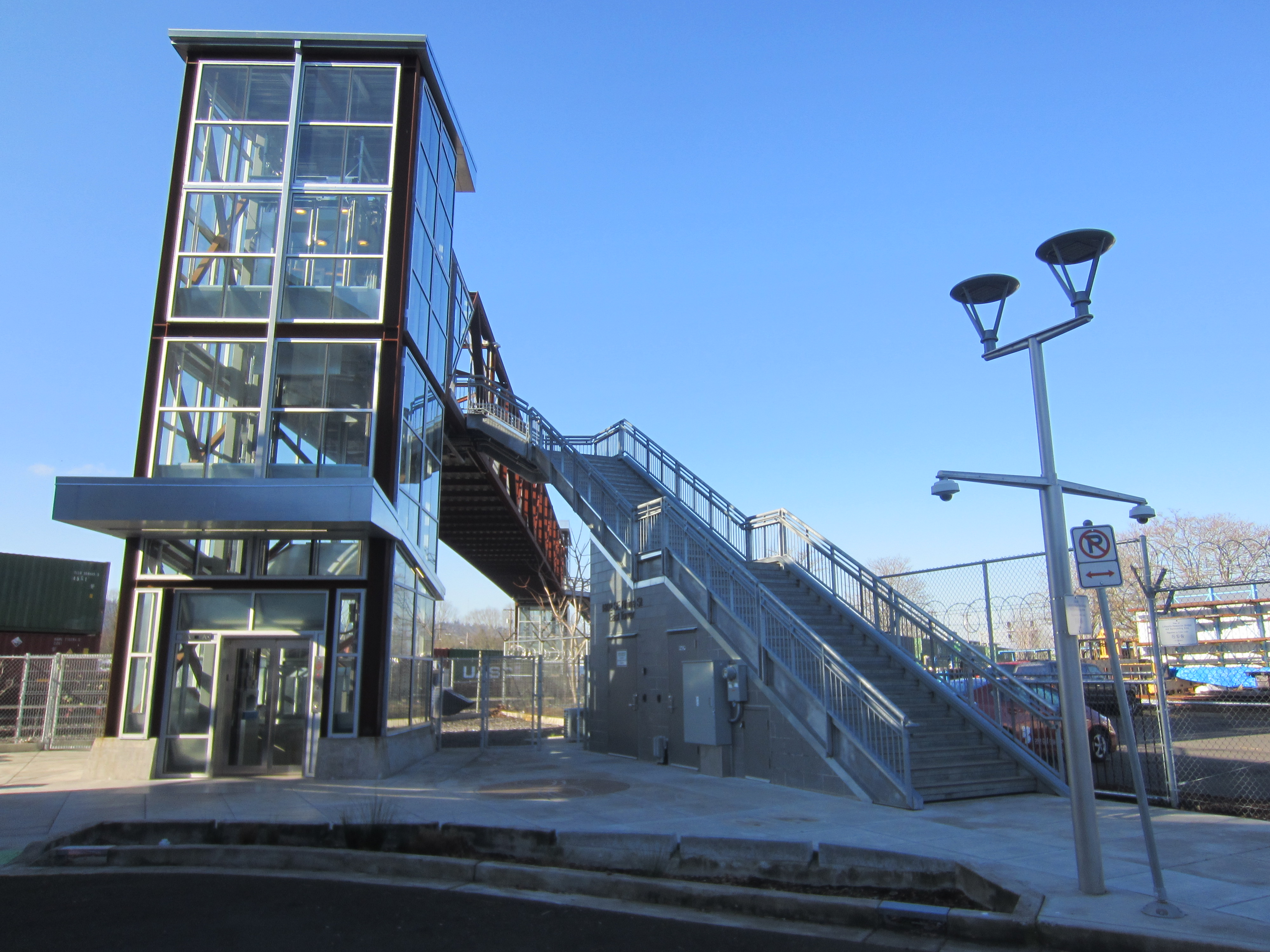
- One of the bridgeheads, 2021
- Coordinates: 45°29′49.9″N 122°38′47.3″W
- Locale: Portland, Oregon, U.S.

Location
- Interactive map of Rhine–Lafayette Pedestrian Overpass

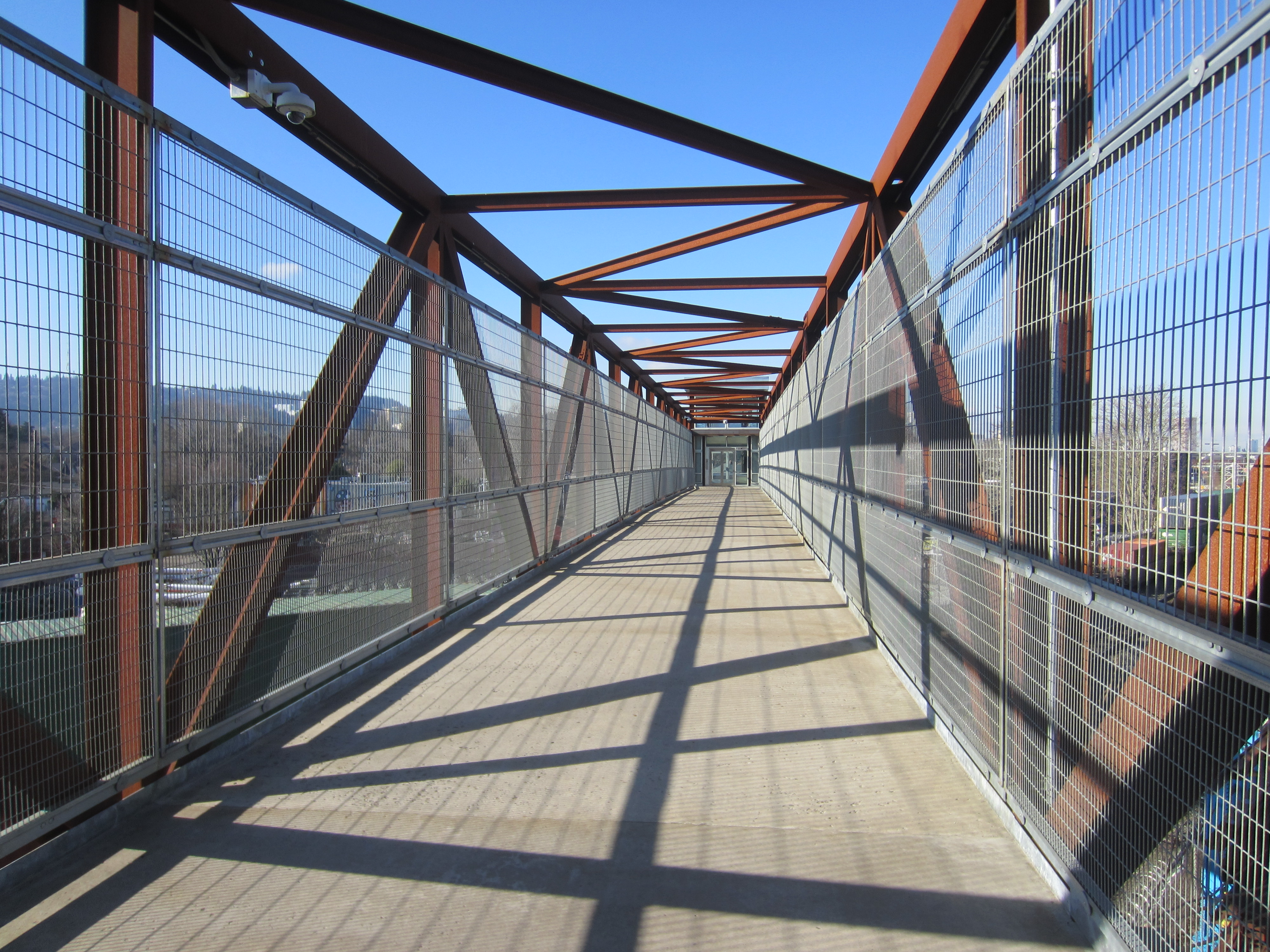
View on the overpass, 2021

The Rhine–Lafayette Pedestrian Overpass, (officially the Lafayette Pedestrian Bridge), is a pedestrian bridge near TriMet's Southeast 17th Avenue and Rhine Street station in southeast Portland, Oregon. It opened in September 2015, replacing a bridge which had spanned the Union Pacific Railroad tracks since 1943. Worked on the bridge began in 2014, and the span was lifted into place in December. Elevator improvements were completed in 2018. Along These Lines is installed at one end.
