= Lincoln St/SW 3rd Ave station =

Light rail station in Portland, Oregon, United States

Lincoln St/SW 3rd Ave
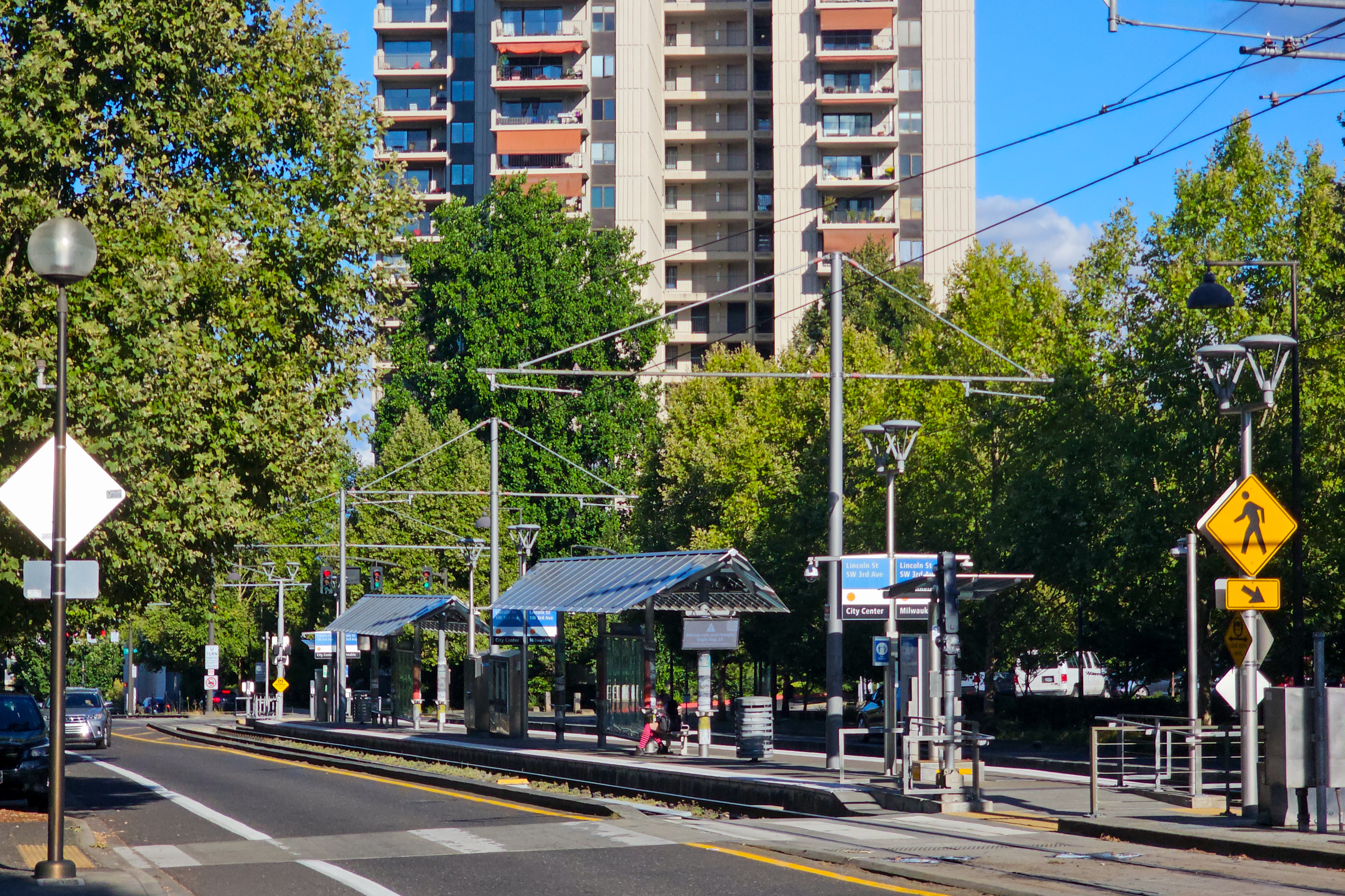

General information
- Location: 229 Southwest Lincoln Street; Portland, Oregon; United States
- Coordinates: 45°30′29″N 122°40′51″W
- Owner: TriMet
- Platforms: 1 island platform
- Tracks: 2
- Bus routes: FX2, 4, 9, 17; 291 - Orange Night Bus

Construction
- Cycle facilities: 8 bike rack spaces
- Accessible: yes

History
- Opened: September 12, 2015

Services
Preceding station	TriMet	Following station
South Waterfront/S Moody toward SE Park Ave	Orange Line	PSU South/SW 6th & College Terminus
South Waterfront/S Moody toward SE Park Ave	Orange Line	PSU South/SW 5th & Jackson One-way operation
Location

Lincoln Street/Southwest 3rd Avenue is a light rail station on the MAX Orange Line, located at 229 Southwest Lincoln Street in Portland, Oregon.

== Features ==
Trio, a series of three mixed metal sculptures by Elizabeth Conner, was installed at the site in 2013.

The Lincoln Street/Southwest 3rd Avenue Mstation features an experimental "eco-track" with 1-inch-thick (2.5 cm) mats of grass to create a vegetated trackway that reduces stormwater runoff. The surface, which primarily uses species from the Sedum genus of flowering plants, was installed in November 2013 by contractors Stacy Witbeck on both sides of the station's island platform.

== Bus service ==
As of August 23, 2026, this station is served by the following bus lines:

- FX2–Division
- 4–Fessenden/Woodstock
- 9–Powell Blvd
- 17–Holgate/NE 33rd

Discontinued 8/27/23

- 43–Taylors Ferry Rd (renamed to Taylors Ferry/Marquam Hill after being redirected into Oregon Health & Science University)

Discontinued 8/23/26

- 19–Woodstock/Glisan (Glisan segment reassigned to 58-Canyon Rd)

== Gallery ==
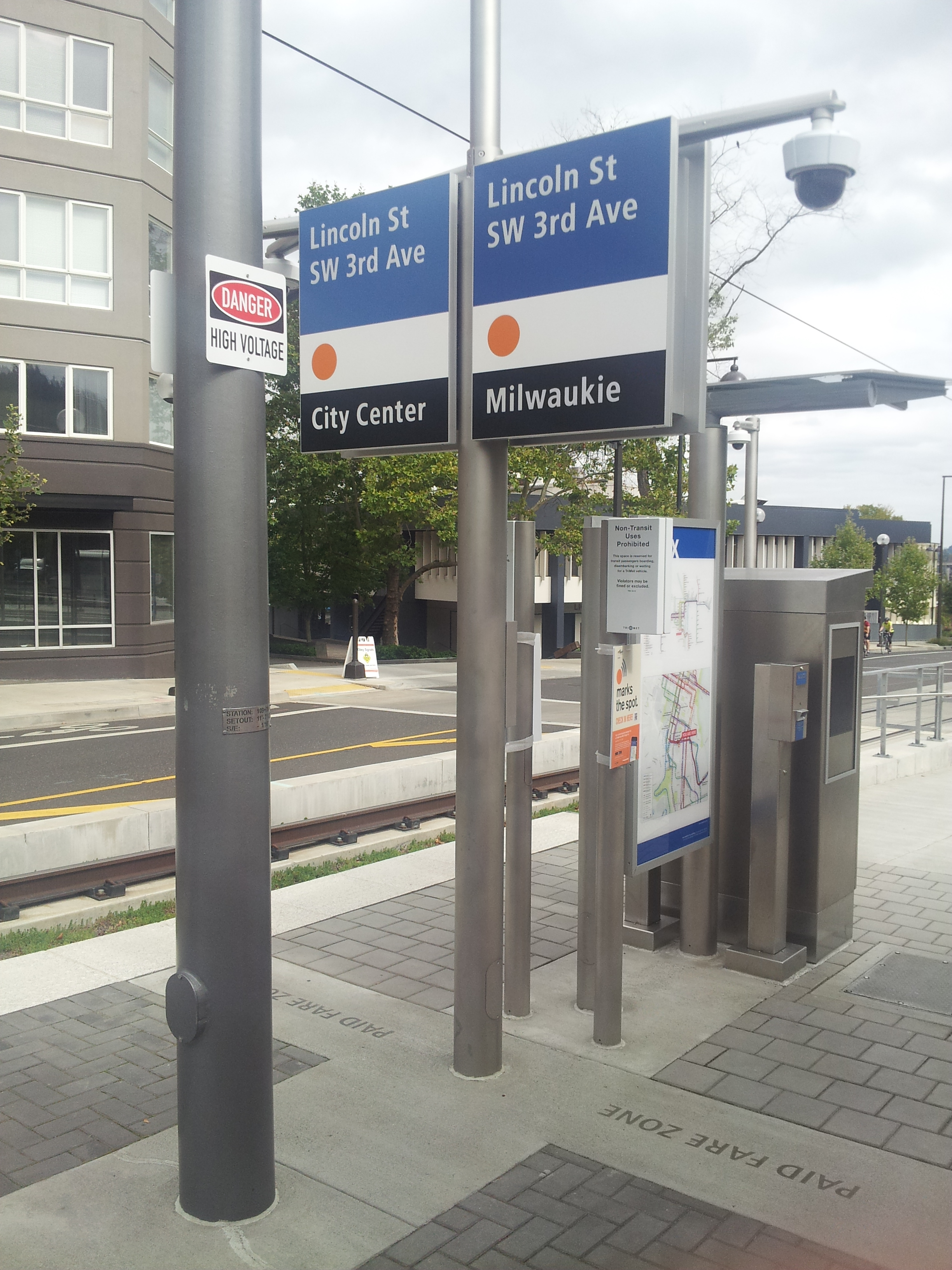
Station signage in 2015
