= Trio (Conner) =

Sculpture in Portland, Oregon, U.S.

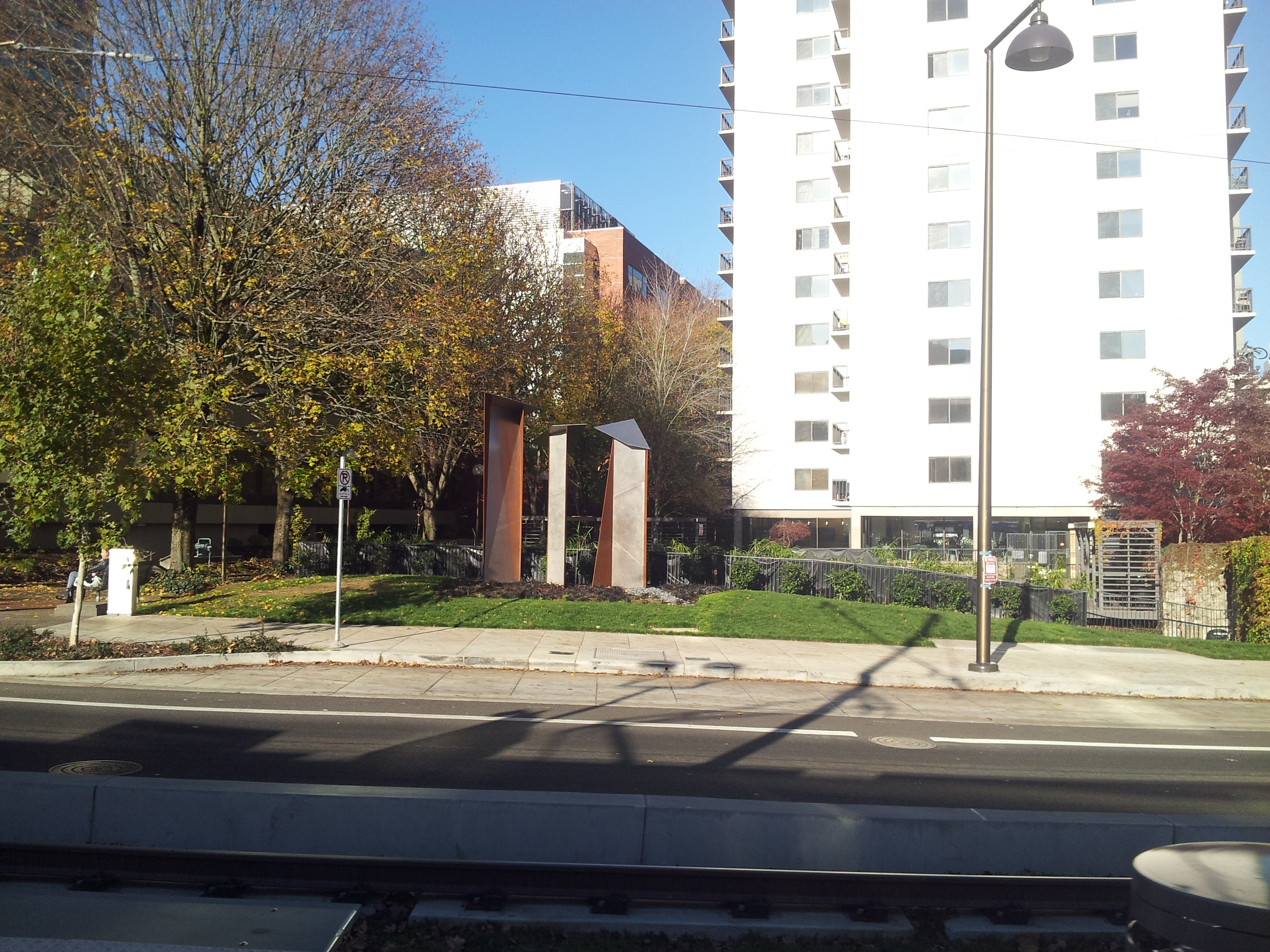
- View of the sculpture from the station's platform in 2015
- Artist: Elizabeth Conner
- Year: 2013
- Type: Sculpture
- Medium: Mixed metal
- Location: Portland, Oregon, United States; 45.50813°N 122.68082°W

Trio is an outdoor 2013 art installation by Seattle artist Elizabeth Conner, installed at the MAX Orange Line's Lincoln Street/Southwest 3rd Avenue MAX Station in Portland, Oregon, United States.

== Description ==
Trio consists of three abstract, mixed metal sculptures inspired by the work of choreographer Anna Halprin and architect Lawrence Halprin. The pieces range in height from 9–12 feet and 2–5 feet in width. Conner has said of the series: "In designing sculptures for this space, I considered the Halprins' radical advocacy for a wide range of participation in spaces that are truly public. My artwork for this space is a respectful reference to the ephemeral nature of traveling from one place to another, with a glimpse of movement, light and shadow, out of the corner of the eye."

== See also ==
- 2013 in art
