= Passage (sculpture) =

Sculpture series in Portland, Oregon

- One of the installation's 38 weathered steel boat sculptures; this one was photographed at the Southeast 17th Avenue and Holgate Boulevard MAX Station in September 2015
- Artist: Bill Will
- Year: 2014
- Type: Sculpture
- Medium: Steel
- Subject: Boats
- Location: Portland, Oregon, United States; 45°29′18.0″N 122°38′54.5″W

Passage is an outdoor 2014 art installation consisting of 38 weathered steel boat sculptures by Bill Will, installed along the MAX Orange Line in the Brooklyn neighborhood of southeast Portland, Oregon, in the United States.

== Description ==
Bill Will's Passage consists of 36 weathered steel boat sculptures installed adjacent to MAX Orange Line tracks along Southeast 17th Avenue between McLoughlin and Powell boulevards. According to TriMet, which began installing the sculptures in March–April 2014, the "pieces draw on the natural history of the area while celebrating the Portland-Milwaukie light rail transit project's green street improvements in the corridor". The project's cost was not confirmed in TriMet's announcement.

== See also ==
- 2014 in art
