= Tri It =

Mural in Portland, Oregon

- The mural along Holgate Blvd. in 2015
- Artist: Blaine Fontana
- Year: 2015
- Type: Mural
- Medium: Paint
- Location: Portland, Oregon, United States; 45.49043°N 122.64773°W

Tri It (stylized as TRI IT and also known as the TriMet Mural) is an outdoor 2015 mural by Blaine Fontana, painted outside the TriMet Bus Maintenance Facility in Portland, Oregon, in the United States.

== Description ==
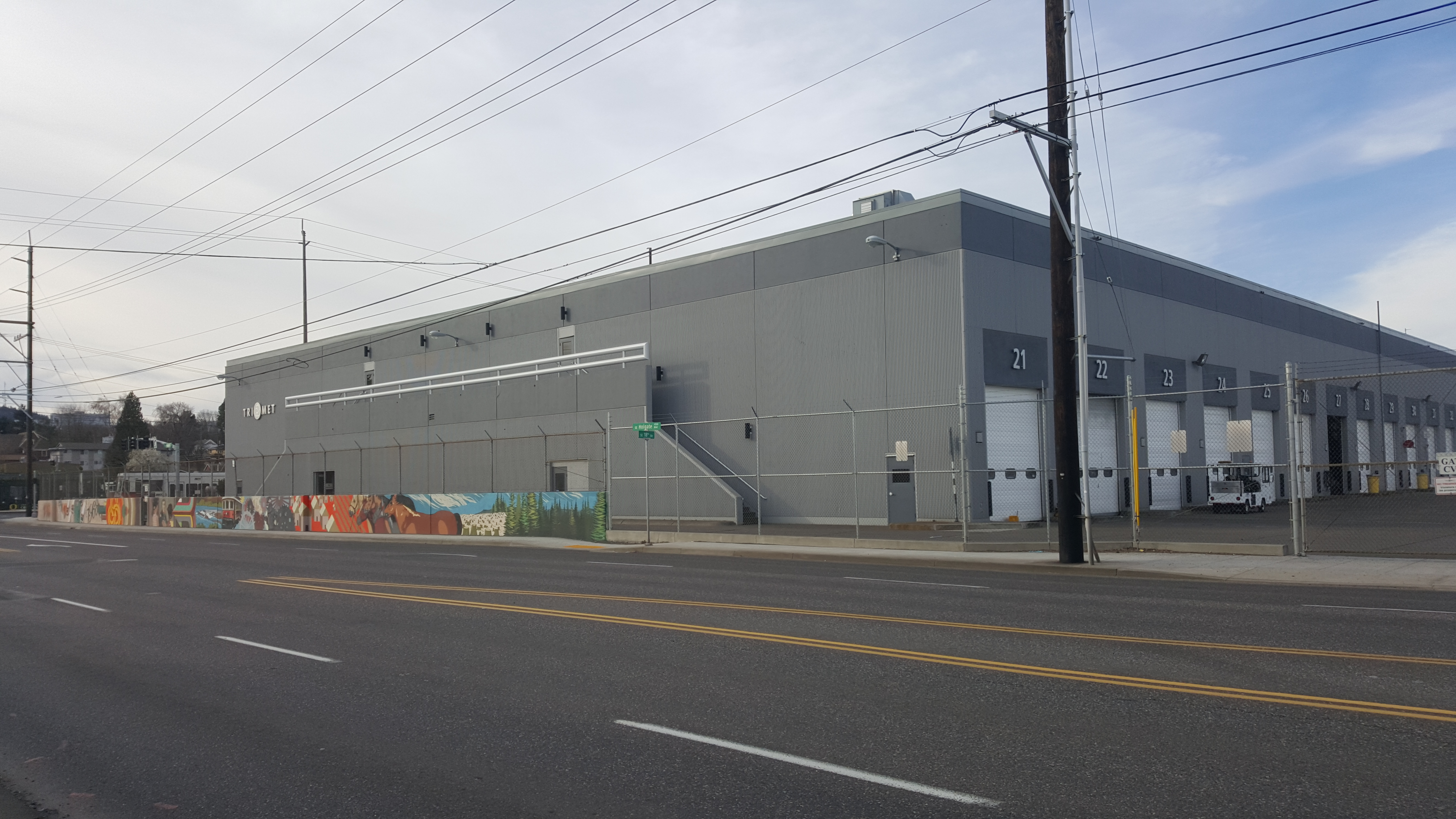
TriMet Bus Maintenance Facility, 2016

Tri It is a 1,250-square-foot mural by Blaine Fontana, with assistance from Gage Hamilton, David Rice, and Zach Yarrington, painted outside the TriMet Bus Maintenance Facility and across from the MAX Orange Line's Southeast 17th Avenue and Holgate Boulevard MAX Station in Portland's Brooklyn neighborhood. It depicts the history of the city's public transit. According to TriMet, a public agency that operates mass transit in a region that spans most of the Portland metropolitan area, the painting portrays the agency's "central role in local public transit history at the site where various transportation companies have served the public for over 100 years. Despite the predominant car culture, the region's transportation system has long been a beacon of pioneering spirit, inspiring the nation with its bicycle, pedestrian, streetcar, bus, and light rail connectivity."

The wording used for the mural's title, a play on words based on the transit agency's name, was used by TriMet in the late 1970s as an advertising slogan (written as "Tri-It", because the agency's name included a hyphen at that time).

The mural is a timeline and moves forward chronologically, beginning on the east end of the wall along Southeast Holgate Boulevard, which depicts the westward expansion that began prior to 1872. Sections of the mural illustrate Portland's public transit improvements. TriMet logos and historical milestones are also displayed. The mural ends around the corner on Southeast 17th Avenue with a depiction of Tilikum Crossing (2015). The artist has said of the piece, "Like most of my murals, TRI IT is about making a positive impact and connecting people. When a piece can spark an ongoing dialogue, it brings pride and connection to a neighborhood. I hope TRI IT helps create a visual identity for Brooklyn that the community is proud to call its own."

== See also ==
- 2015 in art
- Transportation in Portland, Oregon
