= Along These Lines =

Sculpture in Portland, Oregon

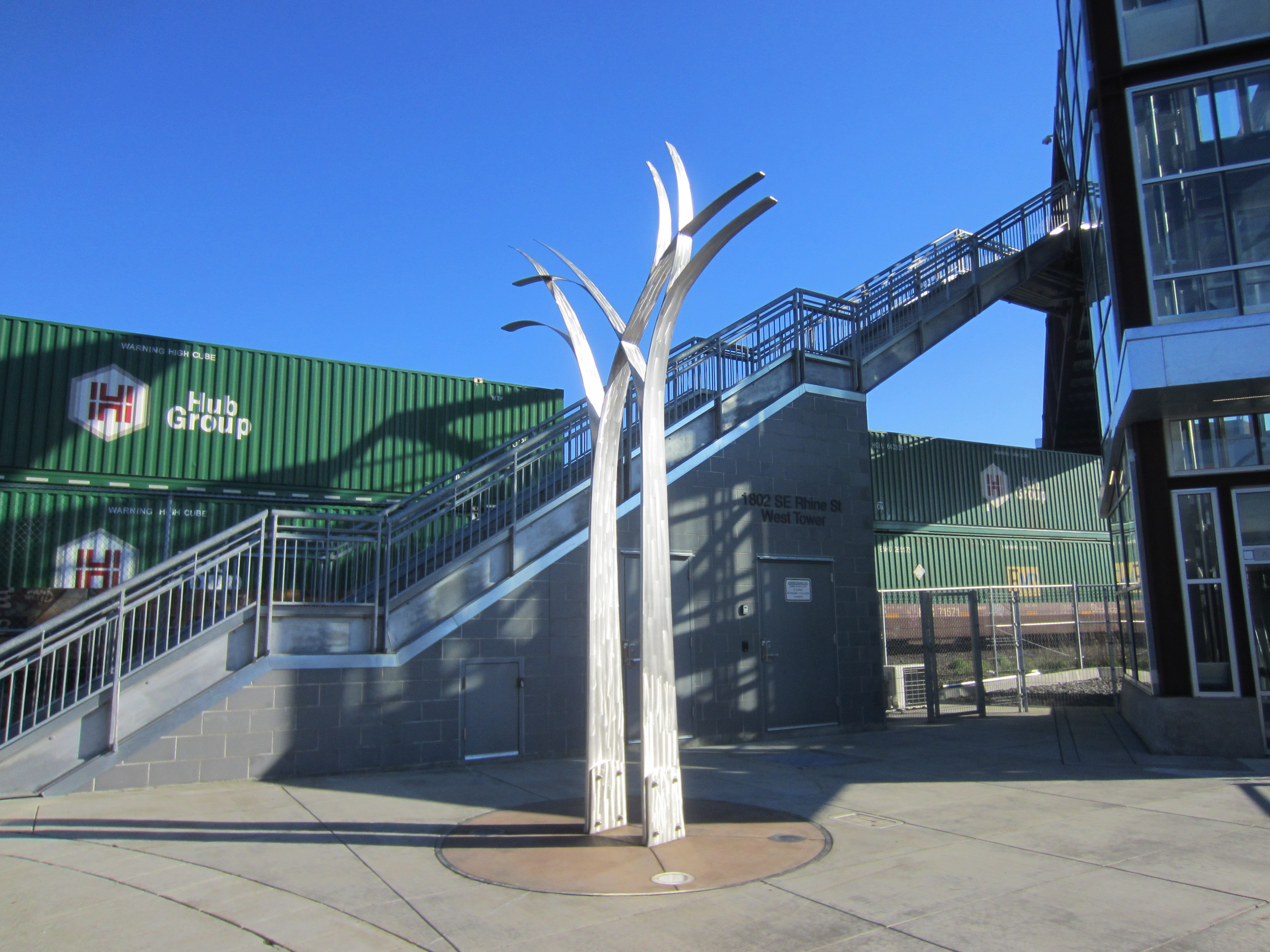
- The sculpture in 2021
- Artist: Anne Storrs
- Year: 2015
- Type: Sculpture, paving medallion
- Medium: Stainless steel
- Location: Portland, Oregon, United States; 45°29′50.6″N 122°38′48.8″W

Along These Lines is an outdoor 2015 stainless steel sculpture and paving medallion by Anne Storrs, installed at the Rhine–Lafayette Pedestrian Overpass landings at the MAX Orange Line's Southeast 17th Avenue and Rhine Street station in southeast Portland, Oregon's Brooklyn neighborhood, in the United States.

According to TriMet, the pieces were inspired by the "similarity of trees and root systems to the branching pattern of train tracks". The stainless steel rings that circle both pieces display poetry by Cleveland High School student Monica Arnone and Paulann Petersen, Oregon Poet Laureate Emerita.

== See also ==
- 2015 in art
