= Rebirth (sculpture) =

Proposed sculpture in Clackamas County, Oregon, U.S.

- Rendering of the proposed sculpture
- Artist: Seyed Alavi
- Type: Sculpture
- Subject: Deer with a child's face
- Dimensions: 9.1 m (30 ft)

Rebirth, nicknamed "Deer Baby" and "Twilight Zone Bambi", was a proposed outdoor sculpture by American artist Seyed Alavi, considered for installation at the MAX Orange Line's Southeast Park Avenue MAX Station in Oak Grove, an unincorporated area neighboring Milwaukie in Clackamas County, Oregon, in the United States. The design of the unfinished creative work, which featured a 30-foot (9.1 m) deer with a child's face, was met with a mixed reception. Unable to meet TriMet's standards and remain under budget, in November 2011 Alavi withdrew his design from the project.

== Description ==
Seyed Alavi's Rebirth was a proposed sculpture considered for installation at the MAX Orange Line's Southeast Park Avenue MAX Station in Oak Grove, an unincorporated area neighboring Milwaukie. The design of the unfinished creative work called for a 30-foot (9.1 m) yellow-painted deer with a child's face and was intended to represent "the interaction between the nearby riparian forest and the people living in Oak Grove". In its concept proposal, the art installation is described as:

A large, stylized deer with childlike face speaks to the community's vision of renewal and the proximity of the station to the new Trolley Trail. Drawn from many traditions from NW Coast Native American carvings to colossal roadside sculpture, Rebirth is a monumental icon that creates a link between the natural environment and the commercial strip of McLoughlin Boulevard.

Alavi's second, more "humanized", rendering of the sculpture

Two renderings of Alavi's design were made available to the public; the first computer-generated image did not include context, which arguably provoked debate over its design, while the second was more "humanized" and illustrated how the installation could interact with people and the surrounding environment. TriMet confirmed at least two changes to the sculpture's original design: a 15-foot (4.6 m) move to the southeast to avoid crossing into the Trolley Trail or Milwaukie's boundaries, and removal of its mosaic tile facade to reduce costs.

In October 2011, the artist presented a revised concept to TriMet's Public Art Advisory Committee. The sculpture's color and dimensions were unchanged, but it would be made of glass-reinforced concrete. Its surface treatment remained undetermined, but Alavi wanted one that would be "natural or inherent" to the material to achieve a "reflective, glowing, and magical" appearance. The committee preferred the reflective appearance seen in the artist's original design and requested material samples at his final presentation, which was scheduled to take place in December.

== History and public reaction ==
Upon public release, Rebirth's design became a "target for ridicule". In June 2011, Milwaukie neighborhood association leaders sent a letter to the Public Art Advisory Committee expressing their disappointment with the proposed deer concept, hoping to see changes to its final design. Some residents thought the sculpture should be more accessible and less expensive; conversely, the Oak Lodge Community Council chairwoman, who also served as a member of the art committee, hoped the sculpture could serve as a community space and reach "icon" status. In a formal letter, TriMet's general manager responded to the neighborhood associations by encouraging residents to "communicate directly with the art committee by inviting members to neighborhood association leadership meetings". The agency's spokeswoman also told committee leaders that the public was welcome to share their preferences regarding the work's dimensions, fabrication methods, form, and materials. Oak Grove and Milwaukie residents also disagreed about whether or not those in the latter city had a say about the sculpture, which would have been within the area's boundaries according to the first design.

In October 2011, at a public meeting to address TriMet's projected budget gap, one Milwaukie resident asked the agency to abandon its plans to fund Rebirth, saying that "a lot of people think that thing's just ugly. Why are they spending money on something that's an unnecessary add-on at the same time they're talking about cutting bus routes again?" The agency's general manager responded that all possibilities would be considered, though TriMet officials confirmed that cuts to its public art program were not an option and the MAX Orange Line's budget was separate from TriMet's financial problems.

In November 2011, TriMet's public art coordinator confirmed Alavi's withdrawal from the project, saying, "The artist for Park (Avenue) did his due diligence. He did everything possible to make that a reality, but sometimes it's not realistic." According to The Oregonian, Alavi was unable to meet the Public Art Advisory Committee's technical requirements and remain under budget. One committee member admitted, "The form itself was something a lot of people out in the community weren't happy with in the first place, so once the mosaic piece was taken away, it kind of devalued it." Alavi released the following statement:

In honor of the death of the "Deer Baby/Twilight Zone Bambi", I thought a quote by Rod Serling, might be appropriate...

"For the record, prejudices can kill and suspicion can destroy; and a thoughtless, frightened search for a scapegoat has a fallout all of its own for the children, and the children yet unborn. And the pity of it is, that these things cannot be confined to the Twilight Zone."

From The Twilight Zone episode, "The Monsters Are Due on Maple Street", March 6, 1960

Thanks,

Seyed Alavi

The debate over the sculpture's proposed design by TriMet, the art committee, and members of the public reached "near-yelling match" status, resulting in "animosity and general nastiness". Following Alavi's withdrawal, the art committee made plans to reconvene and consider other design proposals for the site.

== Critical response ==
In articles providing updates about the sculpture's status, The Oregonian called the work "larger-than-life style highway art" and "Twilight Zone Bambi". Angela Webber of the Daily Journal of Commerce expressed her love for the sculpture and disappointment in the public's reaction. She wrote, "This makes me so sad. [...] Apparently, this giant baby-faced deer statue isn't pretty enough for Milwaukie. [...] I imagine the folks of Milwaukie just don't get it."

Following confirmation about the artist's withdrawal, the journal's Aaron Spencer said local residents are being deprived of the sculpture's "disturbing fantastical whimsy". In an article called "Let's save the giant baby-faced deer statue!", he wrote: "As we all know, I love this statue. I love it a lot. And I think we can save it. There are lots of places in Portland that could use some beautification, and a little public art can go a long way." Spencer and a colleague compiled a gallery of images created using Adobe Photoshop to illustrate the sculpture's potential.
