= Paulann Petersen =

American poet (born 1942)

- Born: Paulann Whitman; 1942 (age 83–84); Portland, Oregon
- Occupation: Poet

Paulann Petersen (born 1942) is an American poet from the state of Oregon. A native of Portland, she was Oregon's sixth poet laureate.

== Biography ==
Petersen was born in 1942 in Portland, Oregon, where she graduated from Franklin High School in Southeast Portland. Following high school she went to Pomona College in Claremont, California, before returning to Oregon. Petersen settled in Klamath Falls in Southern Oregon with her family, remaining for 31 years. In 1991, she returned to Portland where she taught high school English at schools such as West Linn High School.

== Literary career ==
In 1975, she had her first published piece, a poem in The Oregonian. Petersen was a Stegner Fellow in 1986–1987. She twice has won Carloyn Kizer Poetry Awards, and also was the recipient of the Stewart Holbrook Award, given for contributions to Oregon literature. In 2002, The Wild Awake—her first full-length collection of poems—was published by Confluence Press. Two years later, she published Blood-Silk, a collection of poems about Turkey. A Bride of Narrow Escape was published in 2006, and Kindle was published in 2008. Petersen was appointed as Oregon's Poet Laureate in 2010, the sixth in state history, replacing Lawson Inada. The Voluptuary was published in 2010, and Understory was published in 2013. She was given a second term as poet laureate in 2012, with her term then ending in April 2014.

== See also ==
- Along These Lines, public art in Portland, Oregon
