= PSU South stations =

Light rail stations in Portland, Oregon

PSU South SW 6th & CollegePSU South SW 5th & Jackson
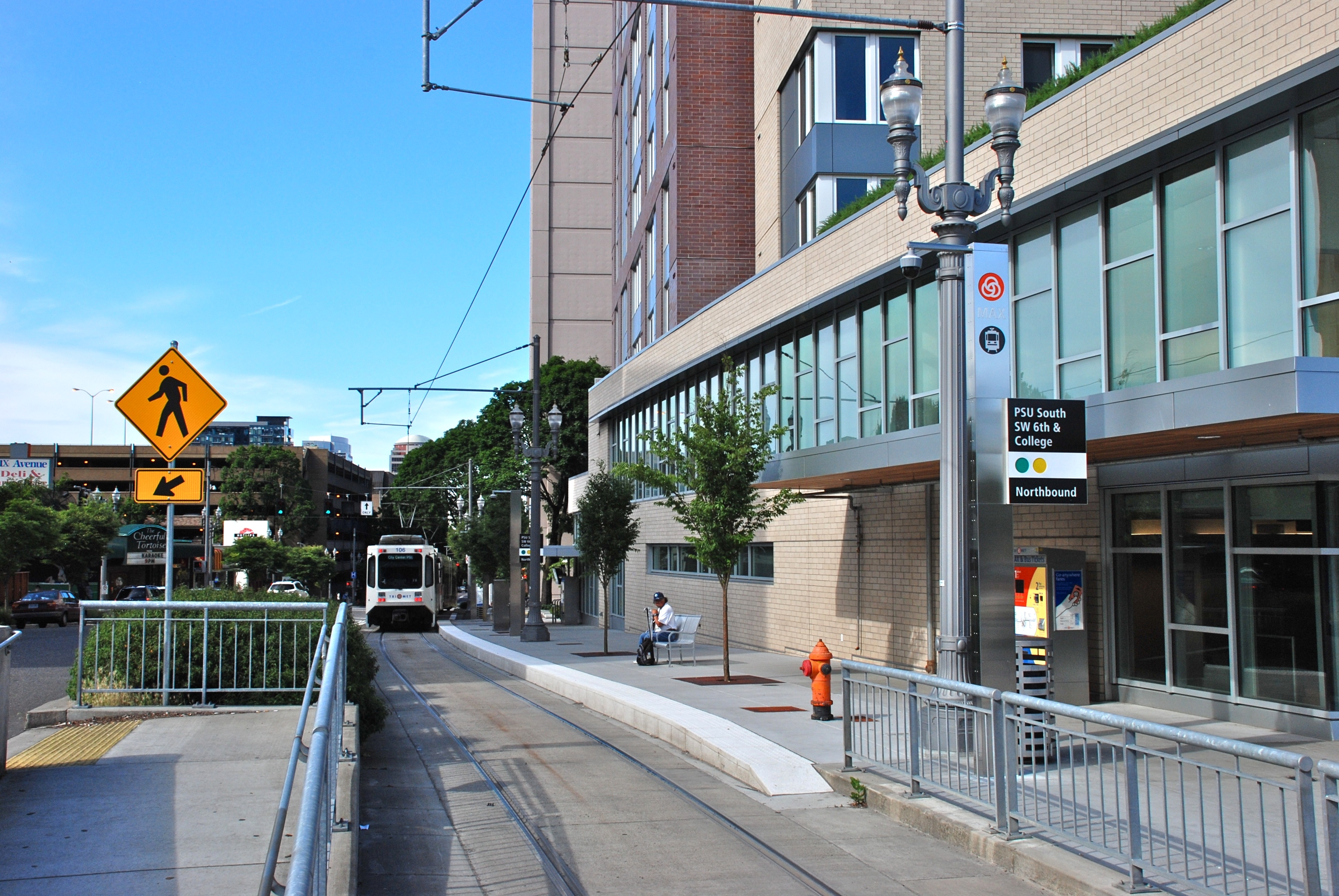
- The northbound station (on 6th Avenue) in 2013

General information
- Location: SW 6th & College (northbound); SW 5th & Jackson (southbound); Portland, Oregon; United States
- Coordinates: 45°30′33″N 122°41′00″W
- Owner: TriMet
- Tracks: 1 per split
- Connections: 12, 44

Construction
- Accessible: yes

History
- Opened: September 2, 2012

Services
Preceding station	TriMet	Following station
6th & SW College
Lincoln St/SW 3rd Ave One-way operation	Orange Line	through to Yellow Line
Lincoln St/SW 3rd Ave One-way operation	Yellow Line	PSU Urban Center/SW 6th & Montgomery toward Expo Center
5th & SW Jackson
Lincoln St/SW 3rd Ave toward SE Park Ave	Orange Line	PSU Urban Center/SW 5th & Mill One-way operation
Former services
Preceding station	TriMet	Following station
6th & SW College
Terminus	Green Line 2009–2026	PSU Urban Center/SW 6th & Montgomery toward Clackamas Town Center Transit Center
Terminus	Portland Vintage Trolley 2009–2014	PSU Urban Center/SW 6th & Montgomery toward Union Station/NW 6th & Hoyt
5th & SW Jackson
Terminus	Green Line 2009–2026	PSU Urban Center/SW 5th & Mill One-way operation
Terminus	Yellow Line 2012–2015	PSU Urban Center/SW 5th & Mill One-way operation
Terminus	Portland Vintage Trolley 2009–2014	PSU Urban Center/SW 5th & Mill One-way operation
Location

The PSU South stations are a pair of light rail stations on the MAX Orange and Yellow Lines in Portland, Oregon. The northbound station is PSU South/Southwest 6th and College station and the southbound station is PSU South/Southwest 5th and Jackson station. Together, they serve as the southern passenger terminus—one for departures only and the other for arrivals only—of the Portland Transit Mall MAX line. The stations opened on September 2, 2012.

Although MAX trains began operating regularly past the sites of these stations on August 30, 2009, construction of the stations had yet to begin, because TriMet, operator of the MAX system, was still working with Portland State University officials on finalizing plans to redevelop the block of property adjacent to (and between) the two station sites as transit-oriented development. Those development plans were finalized in 2010, and construction of a new 16-story residence hall on the block began in November 2010, for opening in 2012. For the first three years of MAX service on the Portland Mall, from 2009 to 2012, the PSU Urban Center/Southwest 6th & Montgomery Street and PSU Urban Center/Southwest 5th & Mill Street stations temporarily served as the southern terminus (for passengers) of the Green and Yellow Lines. As of August 2026, the Green Line was cut back to Gateway Transit Center and no longer serves either station.

The stations are built into the sidewalks of 5th and 6th Avenues. Each extends along the entire block face from Jackson Street to College Street, but their names refer only to the cross street located at the head end of a train stopping there. Except on Orange Line trains, passengers heading southbound are required to disembark at this station. From here, trains then continue south to the turnaround loop located just beyond the station, where layover is taken. There are two loop tracks immediately south of Jackson Street that allow terminating Green Line trains access to 6th Avenue from 5th, similar to the three-track loop near the Library/Southwest 9th Avenue and Galleria/Southwest 10th Avenue stations. The loop originally had three tracks, but one of them was removed when the Orange Line was built through the station.

In normal service, inbound Orange Line trains become Yellow Line trains upon arrival at this station.
