= SE Park Ave station =

Light rail station

SE Park Ave
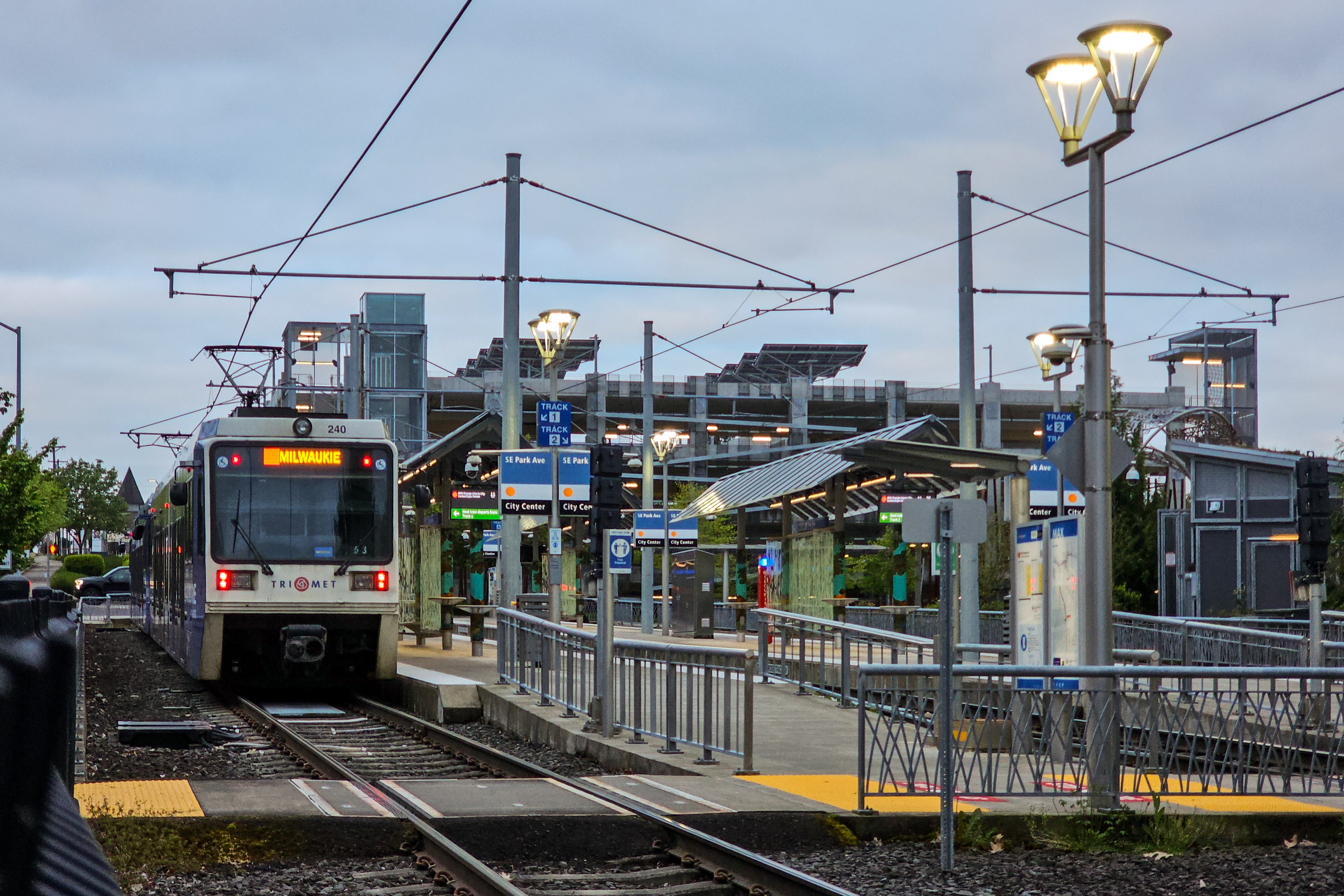
- The station's platforms and park and ride, viewed from the north in 2026

General information
- Location: 2735 SE Park Avenue; Oak Grove, Oregon, United States
- Coordinates: 45°25′50″N 122°38′06″W
- Owner: TriMet
- Platforms: 2 island platforms
- Tracks: 3
- Bus routes: 2
- Bus operators: TriMet
- Connections: 33

Construction
- Parking: 401 park and ride spaces
- Cycle facilities: 74 secure and 28 rack spaces
- Accessible: yes

History
- Opened: September 12, 2015

Services
Preceding station	TriMet	Following station
Terminus	Orange Line	Milwaukie/Main St toward PSU South/SW 6th & College
Location

SE Park Ave is a light rail station served by TriMet as part of MAX Light Rail. It is located on the northwest corner of Southeast McLoughlin Boulevard and Park Avenue in Oak Grove, an unincorporated area neighboring Milwaukie, Oregon, in the United States. It is the terminus and southernmost stop on the Orange Line and has a 401-space park and ride facility.

Originally, it was planned that this station would be one of two MAX stations, the other being Southeast Bybee Boulevard (also on the Orange Line), that would have fare turnstiles installed as part of a TriMet pilot project during the testing of the Hop Fastpass electronic fare system in 2017, but those plans have not proceeded.

On August 5, 2022, a MAX train collided into a stopblock and damaged parts of the platform.

In March 2024, TriMet began construction of two additional stories at the Park & Ride.

== Bus service ==
Along with the MAX Orange Line, the station is served by the following bus lines:

- 33 - McLoughlin/King Rd.

Discontinued 8/23/24

- 99-Macadam/McLoughlin

== See also ==
- Rebirth (sculpture), proposed public art for the station
- To Grandmother's House, 2015
