= MAX Orange Line (TriMet) =

Light rail line in Portland, Oregon

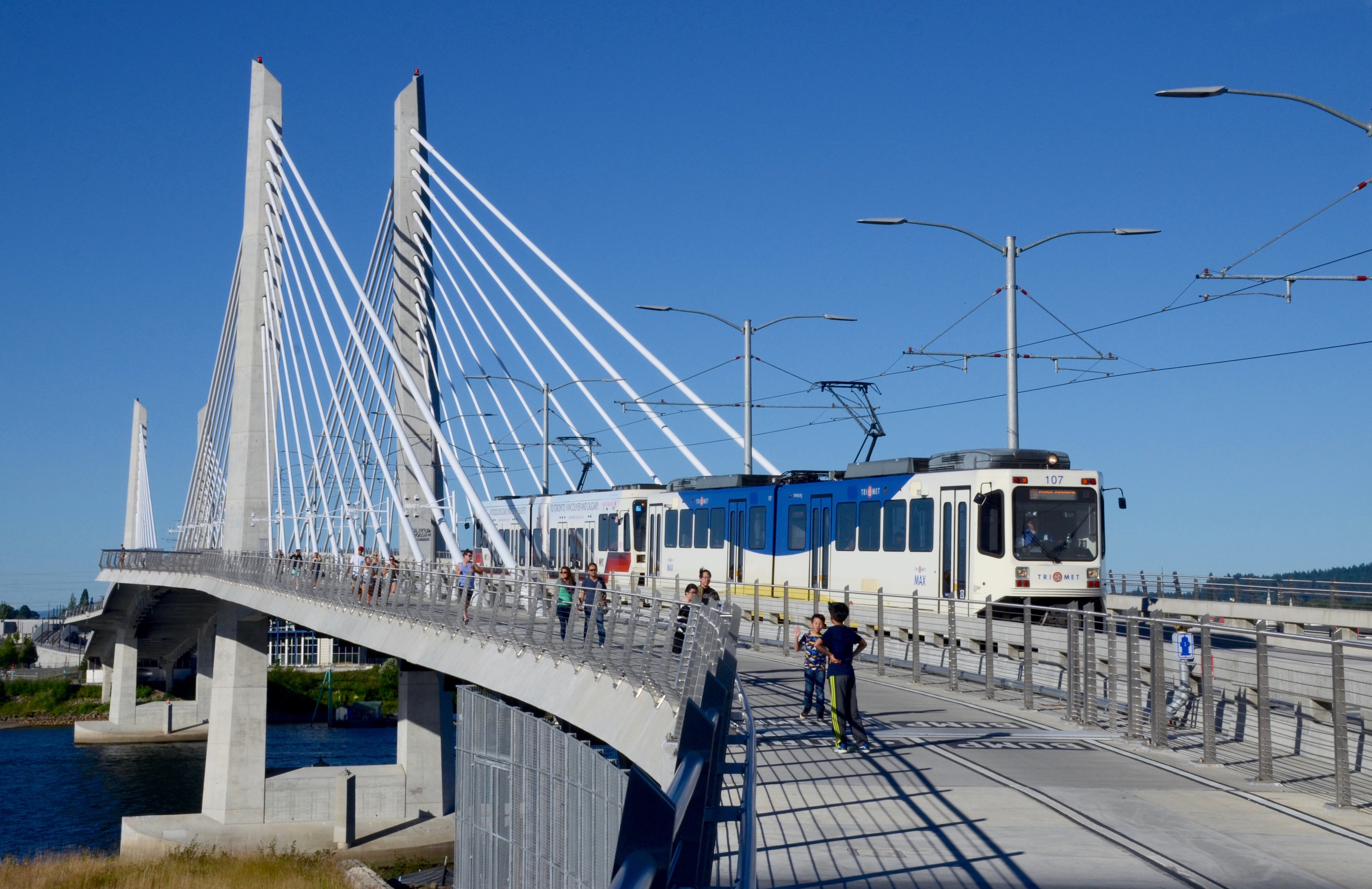
- An Orange Line train on Tilikum Crossing

Overview
- Other name: Portland–Milwaukie Light Rail Project (PMLR)
- Owner: TriMet
- Locale: Portland, Oregon, U.S.
- Termini: Portland Union Station (north); SE Park Ave near Milwaukie in Oak Grove (south)
- Stations: 17
- Website: MAX Orange Line

Service
- Type: Light rail
- System: MAX Light Rail
- Operator: TriMet
- Daily ridership: 5,270 (2025, weekdays)

History
- Opened: September 12, 2015; 11 years ago

Technical
- Line length: 7.3 mi (11.7 km) (Note: TriMet publications only provide the total length of the Portland–Milwaukie extension, i.e., the 7.3-mile (11.7 km) section that was newly built. The total length of Orange Line service, which includes a segment of the Portland Transit Mall, is not provided.)
- Num of tracks: 2
- Character: At-grade and elevated
- Track gauge: 4 ft 8 1/2 in (1,435 mm) standard gauge
- Electrification: Overhead line, 750 V DC
- Maximum incline: 6.86%

The MAX Orange Line is a light rail line serving the Portland metropolitan area in the U.S. state of Oregon. Operated by TriMet as part of MAX Light Rail, it connects Portland City Center, Portland State University (PSU), Southeast Portland, Milwaukie, and Oak Grove. The line serves 17 stations running north–south from Union Station/NW 5th & Glisan station to SE Park Ave station. Northbound on the Portland Transit Mall, the Orange Line operates through to the Yellow Line. Trains run for 21 hours per day with frequenciess of 15 to 30 minutes. Ridership averaged 5,270 per day on weekdays in 2025.

The Portland–Milwaukie Light Rail Project (PMLR) began construction in 2011 following decades of failed light rail plans for the McLoughlin Boulevard (Oregon Route 99E) corridor. The ten-station, 7.3-mile (11.7 km) extension was the second and final phase of the South Corridor Transportation Project, which expanded light rail to Interstate 205 (I-205) and the Portland Transit Mall in its first phase. As part of the PMLR project, TriMet built Tilikum Crossing, the largest "car-free" bridge in the United States, over the Willamette River. Orange Line service commenced on September 12, 2015.

== History ==
=== Early proposals to Clackamas County ===
In 1975, a task force of Governor Tom McCall and the Columbia Region Association of Governments (CRAG) proposed a network of "transitways" between Portland and its suburbs amid efforts to transfer federal assistance funds from the canceled Mount Hood Freeway project. They primarily envisioned busways, but also considered light rail, particularly for the corridor between Portland and Oregon City in Clackamas County. Amid pressure to identify a use for the transfer money, as stipulated by a provision in the Federal Aid Highway Act of 1973, CRAG prioritized redeveloping the Banfield Transitway, a segment of I-84 connecting I-5 in downtown Portland east to I-205, and put the Oregon City corridor on hold. In November of that year, regional transit agency TriMet lost its option to purchase used PCC streetcars from Toronto, which it had hoped to use on the proposed Portland–Oregon City line, after the Toronto Transit Commission declined to renew TriMet's hold. The Banfield Transitway received the transfer funds, and despite efforts from the Oregon Department of Transportation to build a busway, a light rail line was built. The first segment of the Metropolitan Area Express (MAX) opened between Gresham and Portland on September 5, 1986.

Several months before the inauguration of MAX, Metro, which replaced CRAG in 1979, revisited light rail plans for the Oregon City corridor via McLoughlin Boulevard, as well as proposed converting the partially realized I-205 busway into another light rail line. By that time, however, TriMet had already begun planning for the formally designated "Westside Corridor" in Washington County. Noting that federal funds could only be spent on one project at a time, Metro's Joint Policy Advisory Committee on Transportation (JPACT) made the I-205 corridor their next priority after the Westside project and the McLoughlin Boulevard corridor third priority. Clackamas County officials went on to dispute the federal money, including $17 million in excess funds that had been allocated to the I-205 busway. To settle the issue, Metro released a regional transportation plan (RTP) that reasserted the Westside Corridor's priority in January 1989.

=== Failed South/North line ===
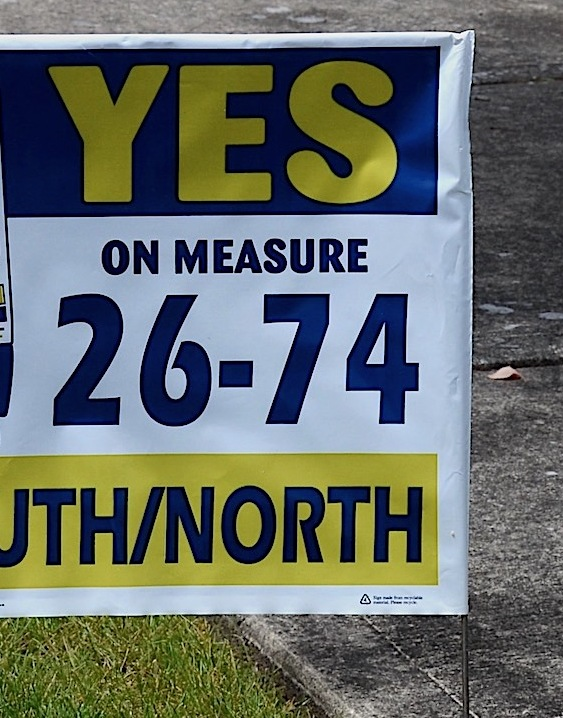
A lawn sign supporting the 1998 South/North ballot measure

Despite priority given to the Westside Corridor, Metro's RTP commissioned studies for the I-205 and McLoughlin Boulevard corridors. In September 1989, U.S. Senators and members of the Senate Committee on Appropriations Mark Hatfield of Oregon and Brock Adams of Washington secured $2 million from the federal government to assess both segments. At the request of the senators, a segment farther north to Vancouver and Clark County in Washington became part of the proposals. As the studies analyzed alternative routes, the project's advisory committee increasingly favored an alignment closer to downtown Portland along the busier I-5 and Willamette River corridors. In 1994, Metro finalized a 25-mile (40 km) light rail route from Hazel Dell, Washington through downtown Portland to Clackamas Town Center, which TriMet formally called the "South/North Corridor".

In November that year, Metro asked Oregon voters in the Portland metropolitan area if they would authorize a $475 million bond measure, which would provide funding for Oregon's share of the project's estimated $2.8 billion cost. Nearly two-thirds of the voters said yes. To fund Washington's $237.5 million share, Clark County proposed raising sales and vehicle excise taxes by 0.3 percent, also requiring voter approval. On February 7, 1995, 69 percent of those who voted in Clark County rejected the proposed tax increases, halting the project. Planning for the South/North Corridor resumed later that year when TriMet released a revision that scaled back the line's northern half by eliminating its North Portland and Clark County segments up to the Rose Quarter. To fill the funding gap that resulted from the exclusion of Clark County, the Oregon House of Representatives passed a $750 million transportation package, including $375 million for the project. The Oregon Supreme Court promptly struck down this funding due to the inclusion of unrelated measures, which violated the state's constitution. In February 1996, state legislators revised the package, but light rail opponents forced a statewide vote in November that ultimately prevented the use of state funds.

In an effort to gain the support of North Portland residents, who had historically voted in favor of light rail, and to avoid seeking state funding, TriMet announced a third plan in February 1997 that proposed a 15-mile (24 km) line from Lombard Street in North Portland to Clackamas Town Center. The Portland City Council later extended the alignment through North Portland so it would terminate another 1 mile (1.6 km) north of Lombard Street in Kenton. In August, due to the wording on the original ballot passed in 1994, which described the line extending into Clark County, the TriMet board decided to hold another vote on a new $475 million bond measure. Portland area residents cast their vote on November 3, 1998, and rejected it by 52 percent, effectively canceling the project. Despite the South/North project's cancellation, North Portland residents and city business leaders continued to push for light rail. In 1999, they urged TriMet to revive the northern portion of the South/North project, which led to the Interstate MAX and Yellow Line opening in 2004.

=== Revival and funding ===
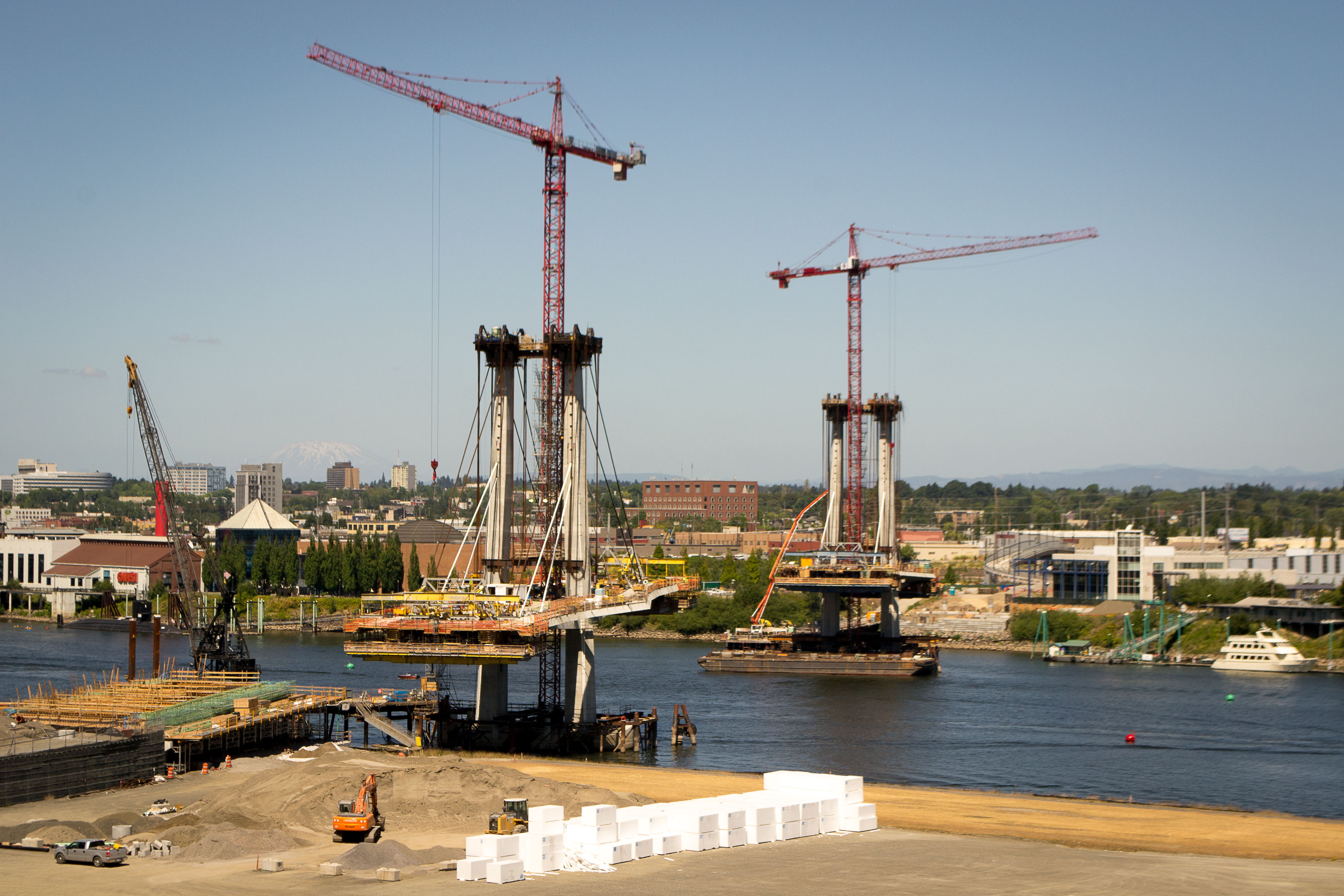
The Portland–Milwaukie Light Rail Bridge, later inaugurated as Tilikum Crossing, under construction in 2013

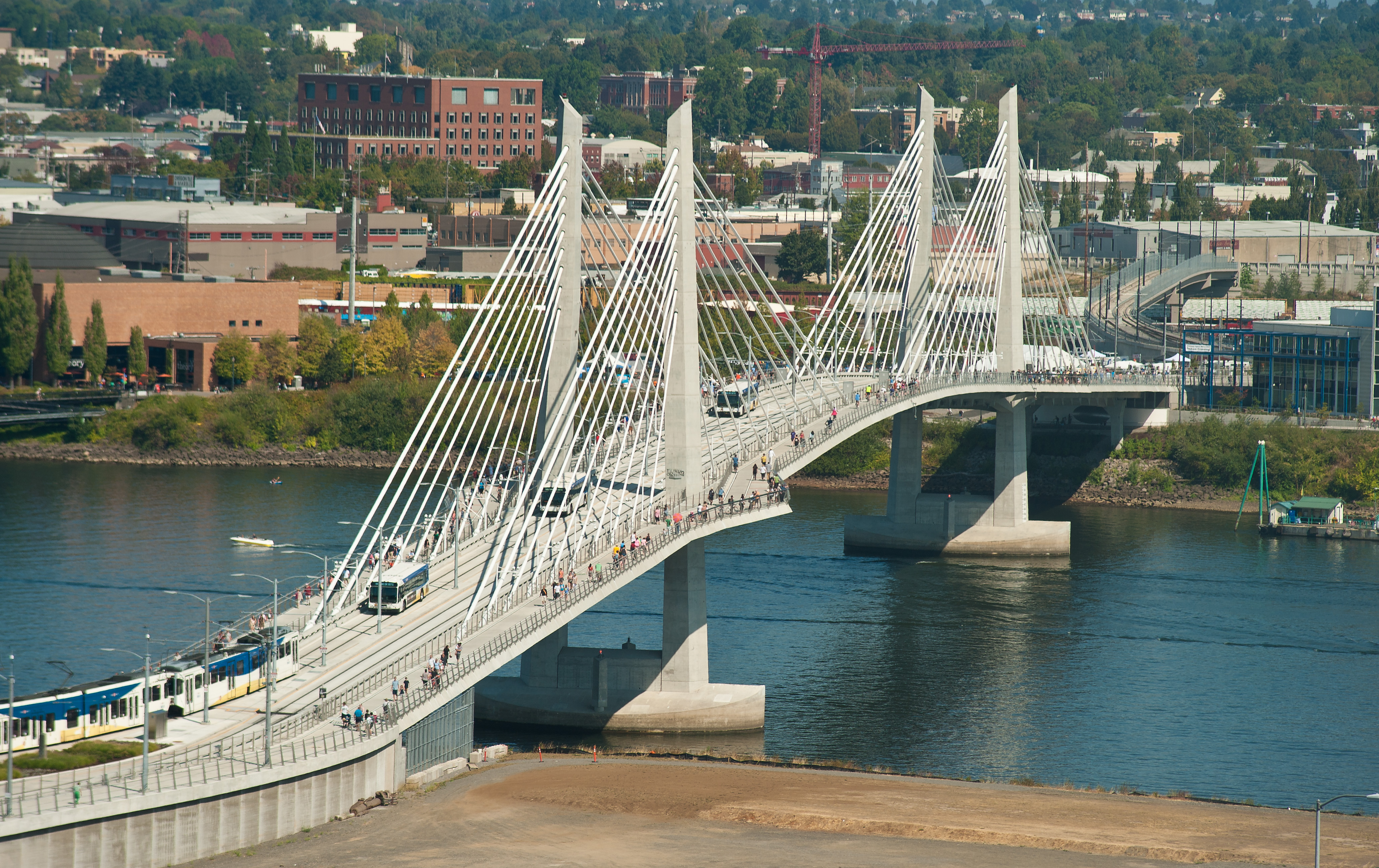
Tilikum Crossing during the Orange Line's opening day in 2015

In April 1999, JPACT revived plans for the I-205 and McLoughlin Boulevard corridors upon announcing the $8.8 million South Corridor Transportation Study. The committee published the study's report in October 2000, narrowing a range of transit alternatives for each corridor; it outlined constructing either two light rail lines, a combination of one light rail line and one improved bus service, bus rapid transit, or dedicated bus lanes. After public meetings concluded in 2003, JPACT recommended both light rail options. They decided the first MAX line to Clackamas County should be built along the I-205 busway from Gateway to Clackamas Town Center, and that this would be the first of two phases, the second of which would be a Portland–Milwaukie line via McLoughlin Boulevard. While planning for the second phase, alignment studies within downtown Portland showed that a fourth service along the existing tracks on Morrison and Yamhill streets, then served by the Blue, Red, and Yellow lines, would push that segment to maximum capacity. JPACT responded by amending the first phase to include adding light rail to the Portland Transit Mall. The first phase would be completed in 2009, with the transit mall rebuilt with light rail and the Yellow Line rerouted to it in August. The I-205 segment would open the following month with a new Green Line service.

In July 2008, Metro adopted a locally preferred alternative (LPA) route for the second-phased Portland–Milwaukie line that began at the southern end of the Portland Transit Mall and terminated at Southeast Park Avenue in Oak Grove, just south of Milwaukie proper in unincorporated Clackamas County; the alignment was extended beyond Southeast Lake Road in downtown Milwaukie, which had been the terminus in the 2003 LPA. The 2008 LPA also proposed a new bridge that would carry MAX and the Portland Streetcar over the Willamette River, in lieu of the Hawthorne Bridge, amid fears that the latter would create a traffic bottleneck. This new bridge had been proposed to run between RiverPlace on the west end and the Oregon Museum of Science and Industry (OMSI) on the east end, but the 2008 LPA introduced a new alternative that moved its west end farther south to the South Waterfront. The new bridge would accommodate only transit vehicles, bicycles, and pedestrians, and spanning 1,720 feet (520 m), it would become the largest "car-free" bridge in the country upon completion. The project's final environmental impact statement was published in October 2010.

The PMLR project was budgeted at $1.49 billion, of which federal funding covered $745.2 million under the New Starts program. Despite TriMet's request for a 60-percent federal share, the Federal Transit Administration (FTA) only committed 50 percent, lower than any previous MAX project. Oregon provided the second-largest share at $355.2 million, mostly sourced from state lottery bond proceeds. Metro, TriMet, Clackamas County, Portland, Milwaukie, and in-kind property donations contributed $249.3 million to the remaining local-match funds. TriMet and the FTA entered into a funding agreement in May 2012. Clackamas County had originally agreed to allocate $25 million to the project but later negotiated a reduction to $22.6 million due to Measure 3-401, an anti-light rail initiative that light rail opponents placed on the ballot. The measure stipulated voter approval before officials could use county funds to finance, design, construct, or operate rail lines in the county. On September 18, 2012, Measure 3-401 passed with 60 percent of the vote. Afterwards, Clackamas County attempted to end its involvement with the project, appealing to TriMet to terminate the extension at SE Tacoma/Johnson Creek station, just north of the county line. TriMet filed a lawsuit, and in July 2013, a circuit court upheld the county's financial obligation and the project's continuation.

=== Construction and opening ===
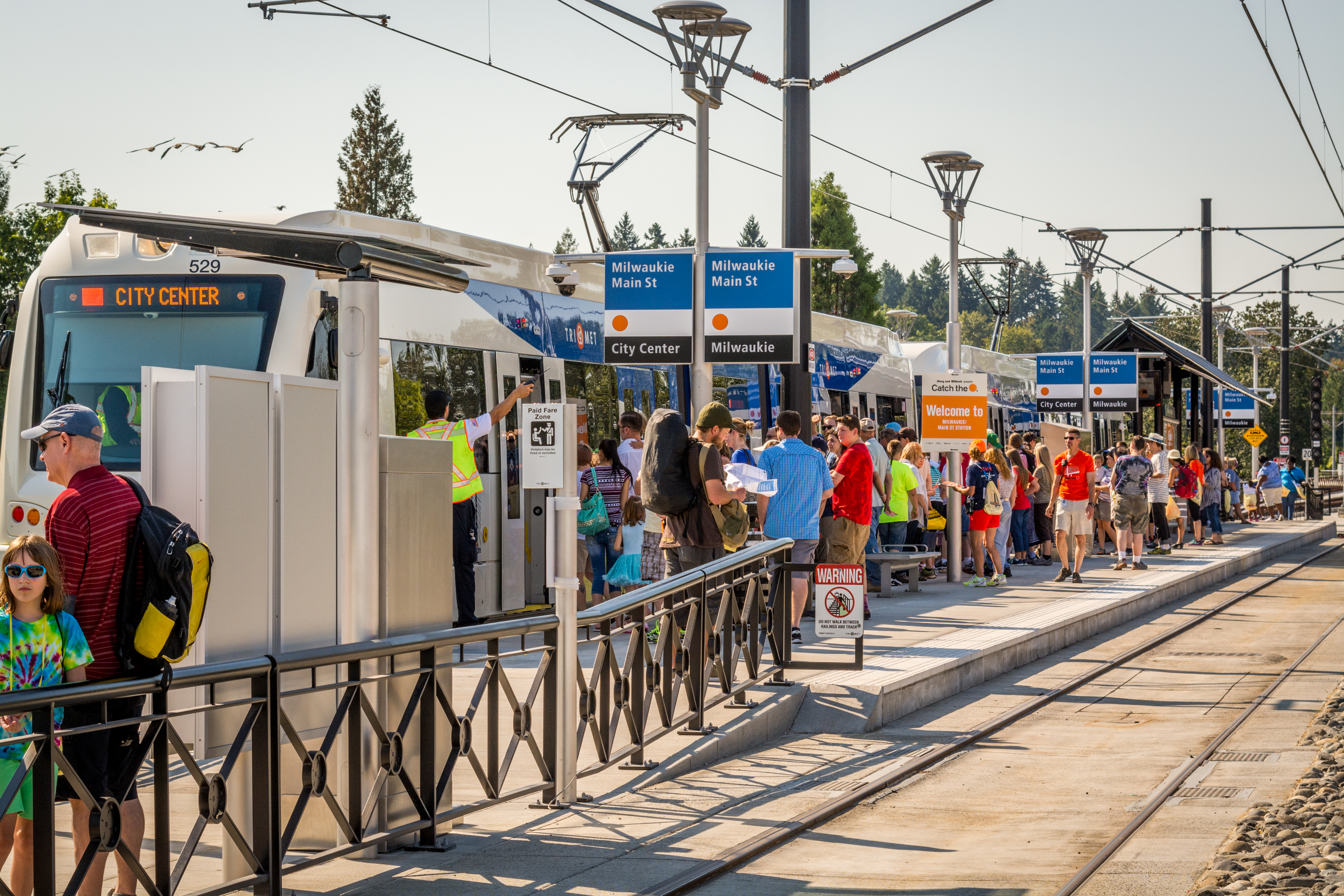
Riders at Milwaukie/Main St station on opening day

In April 2011, the FTA approved the start of the PMLR project's final design, permitting TriMet to begin purchasing rights-of-way and construction materials. Construction began on June 30, initially limited to the site of the new Willamette River crossing, which was temporarily given the name "Portland–Milwaukie Light Rail Bridge". Utility relocation and other preparation work along the project route began later that year. By 2013, major light rail construction work had started in Clackamas County. Safety improvements were made at several street-level crossings in Southeast Portland and Milwaukie, allowing these areas to be designated quiet zones where freight and MAX trains do not have to use their horns when crossing an intersection. The project was halfway completed by July 2013. In April 2014, TriMet officially named the new bridge "Tilikum Crossing, Bridge of the People", which it selected from over 9,500 public submissions. The agency purchased 18 new Siemens S70 light rail vehicles, designated "Type 5"; the first car arrived in Portland that September. When construction finished the following year, the line was around $40 million under budget. A petition from Senator Jeff Merkley led the FTA to approve previously eliminated project elements such as switch heaters and additional station shelters, at a total cost of $3.6 million.

On May 15, 2015, the first public train ride, carrying 500 passengers including Governor Kate Brown and Senator Merkley, ran at regular operating speed along the entirety of the 7.3-mile (11.7 km) Portland–Milwaukie extension. On August 30, test trains began running ahead of the following month's opening date. The extension opened for service on September 12 at 11 am. The Orange Line became interlined with the Yellow Line when it took over service of the southbound 5th Avenue segment of the Portland Transit Mall. TriMet said separating the services would allow it to better control service frequencies from North Portland and Milwaukie to downtown Portland because it expected higher ridership of the Orange Line and that few riders from these communities would travel beyond the city center.

== Route ==
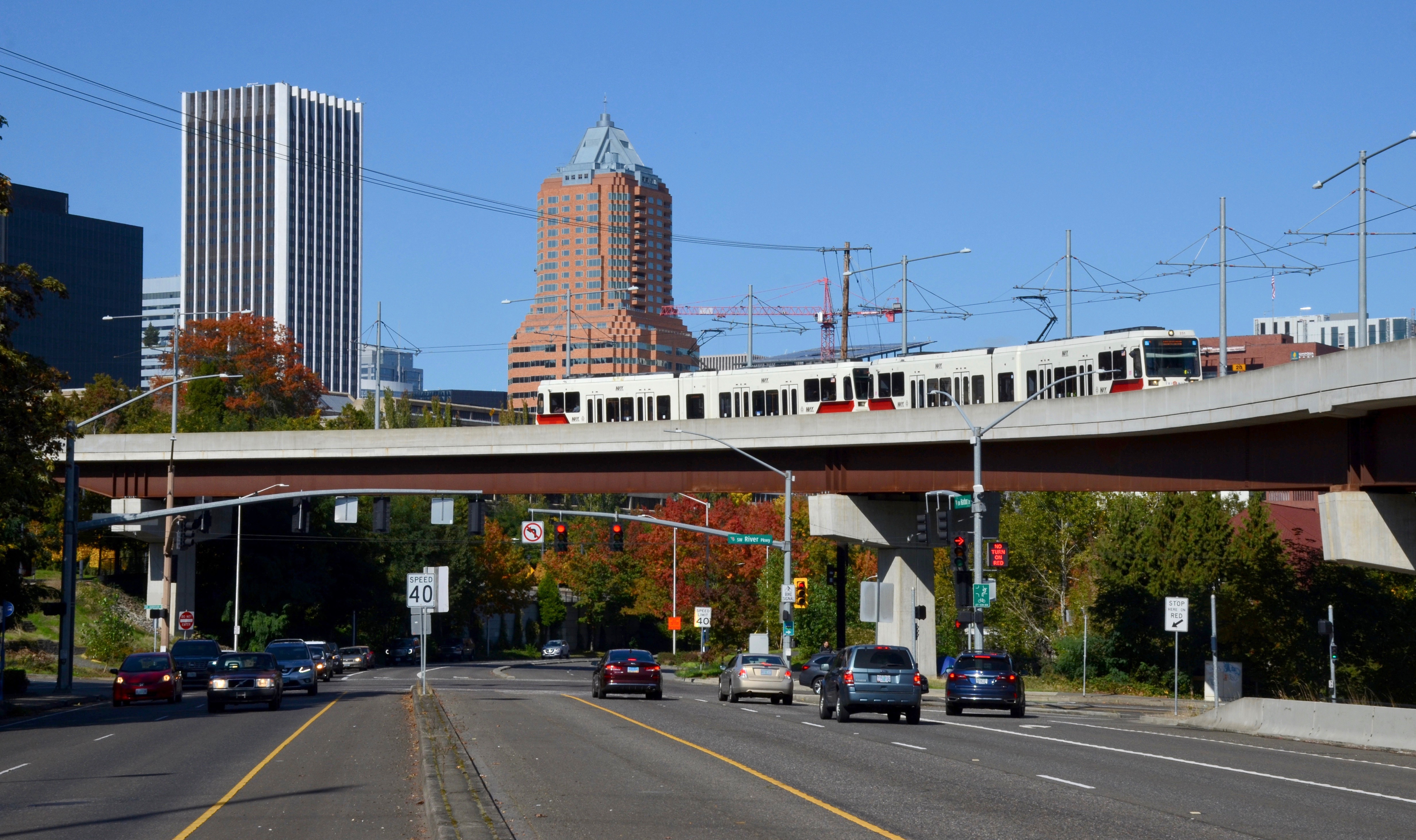
The Portland–Milwaukie extension at the south end of downtown Portland, on the viaduct carrying it over Harbor Drive and River Parkway

The Orange Line serves the 7.3-mile (11.7 km) Portland–Milwaukie segment. This segment begins in downtown Portland at a junction on the southern end of the Portland Transit Mall just west of Southwest 5th and Lincoln. From here, the tracks enter the median of Southwest Lincoln Street and head east to an elevated viaduct after crossing Southwest Naito Parkway. The viaduct carries the line over South Harbor Drive and River Parkway and in between Interstate 5 and South Moody Avenue to the South Waterfront, where it merges with the Portland Streetcar and crosses the Willamette River via Tilikum Crossing.

While the streetcar tracks diverge northward near OMSI, the MAX tracks turn southeast and run parallel to the Union Pacific Railroad (UP). At Southeast Pershing and 17th, the line enters the median of Southeast 17th Avenue and then exits just north of Southeast McLoughlin Boulevard. It continues parallel to this road through to Milwaukie. After a stop at Main Street in downtown Milwaukie, the line traverses the Kellogg Bridge across Kellogg Lake to 22nd Avenue. From here, the tracks leave the viaduct and again travel at-grade alongside McLoughlin Boulevard to a three-track stub terminal at Park Avenue in Oak Grove, just south of Milwaukie proper.

Orange Line service begins farther north of the Portland–Milwaukie segment at Union Station/NW 5th & Glisan station near Portland Union Station in downtown Portland, where southbound Yellow Line trains operate through into the Orange Line to serve the 5th Avenue segment of the Portland Transit Mall. Conversely, northbound Orange Line trains operate through into the Yellow Line to serve the 6th Avenue segment of the transit mall.

A geographic map of the MAX Orange Line (in red) relative to the rest of the network (in black) with icons marking the line's termini. The official system schematic can be viewed on the TriMet website.

=== Stations ===
The PMLR project added 10 stations to the MAX system, from Lincoln St/SW 3rd Ave station to SE Park Ave station. The Orange Line serves these stations in addition to seven others along 5th Avenue on the Portland Transit Mall, which until 2026 it shared with the Green Line, and brings the total to 17 stations. Transfers to the Yellow Line, which runs northbound parallel to 5th Avenue along the transit mall's 6th Avenue, can be made at any of the seven stations' northbound counterparts, although most northbound Orange Line trains become Yellow Line trains after Lincoln St/SW 3rd Ave station. Riders can also transfer from Pioneer Place/SW 5th station to the Blue and Red lines at the Pioneer Square stations one block west.

The PSU Urban Center/SW 5th & Mill, South Waterfront/S Moody, and OMSI/SE Water stations connect with the Portland Streetcar; Union Station/NW 5th & Glisan station connects with Amtrak at nearby Portland Union Station; and several stations connect with local and intercity bus services, including Frequent Express (FX).

In 2015, as part of a future pilot program to test the Hop Fastpass automated fare collection system, TriMet proposed installing turnstiles through which passengers would access paid fare zones within the SE Bybee Blvd and SE Park Ave stations. However, these plans have not been enacted. Many stations along the Orange Line have public artwork, commissioned by TriMet's public art program.

Key
Icon	Purpose
↓	Southbound travel only (Note: Most Orange Line trains on the Portland Transit Mall travel southbound only. Most northbound trains operate through into the Yellow Line bound for Expo Center in North Portland at PSU South/SW 6th and College.)

List of MAX Orange Line stations
Station	Connections	Began service	Location
↓ Most southbound Yellow Line trains become the Orange Line at Union Station/NW 5th & Glisan. ↓
Union Station/NW 5th & Glisan↓	Yellow Line (at Union Station/NW 6th & Hoyt); Amtrak (at Portland Union Station); FX2–Division	September 12, 2015	Portland Transit Mall
NW 5th & Couch↓	Yellow Line (at NW 6th & Davis); FX2–Division	September 12, 2015	Portland Transit Mall
SW 5th & Oak↓	Yellow Line (at SW 6th & Pine); FX2–Division	September 12, 2015	Portland Transit Mall
Pioneer Place/SW 5th↓	Blue Line (at Pioneer Square North and Pioneer Square South); Red Line (at Pioneer Square North and Pioneer Square South); Yellow Line (at Pioneer Courthouse/SW 6th); FX2–Division	September 12, 2015	Portland Transit Mall
City Hall/SW 5th & Jefferson↓	Yellow Line (at SW 6th & Madison); FX2–Division	September 12, 2015	Portland Transit Mall
PSU Urban Center/SW 5th & Mill↓	Yellow Line (at PSU Urban Center/SW 6th & Montgomery); A Loop (at PSU Urban Center); B Loop (at SW 5th & Market and SW 5th & Montgomery); NS Line (at PSU Urban Center, SW 5th & Market, and SW 5th & Montgomery); FX2–Division	September 12, 2015	Portland Transit Mall
PSU South/SW 5th and Jackson↓	Yellow Line (at PSU South/SW 6th & College); FX2–Division	September 12, 2015	Portland Transit Mall
↑ Most northbound trains become the Yellow Line at PSU South/SW 6th and College. ↑
Lincoln St/SW 3rd Ave	FX2–Division	September 12, 2015	Portland
South Waterfront/S Moody	A Loop (at S Moody & Meade North and S Moody & Meade South); B Loop (at S Moody & Meade North and S Moody & Meade South); NS Line (at S Moody & Meade North and S Moody & Meade South); FX2–Division	September 12, 2015	Portland
OMSI/SE Water	A Loop (at SE Water/OMSI); B Loop (at SE Water/OMSI); FX2–Division	September 12, 2015	Portland
Clinton St/SE 12th Ave		September 12, 2015	Portland
SE 17th Ave & Rhine St		September 12, 2015	Portland
SE 17th Ave & Holgate Blvd		September 12, 2015	Portland
SE Bybee Blvd		September 12, 2015	Portland
SE Tacoma/Johnson Creek		September 12, 2015	Portland
Milwaukie/Main St		September 12, 2015	Milwaukie
SE Park Ave		September 12, 2015	Oak Grove

Images of MAX Orange Line stations
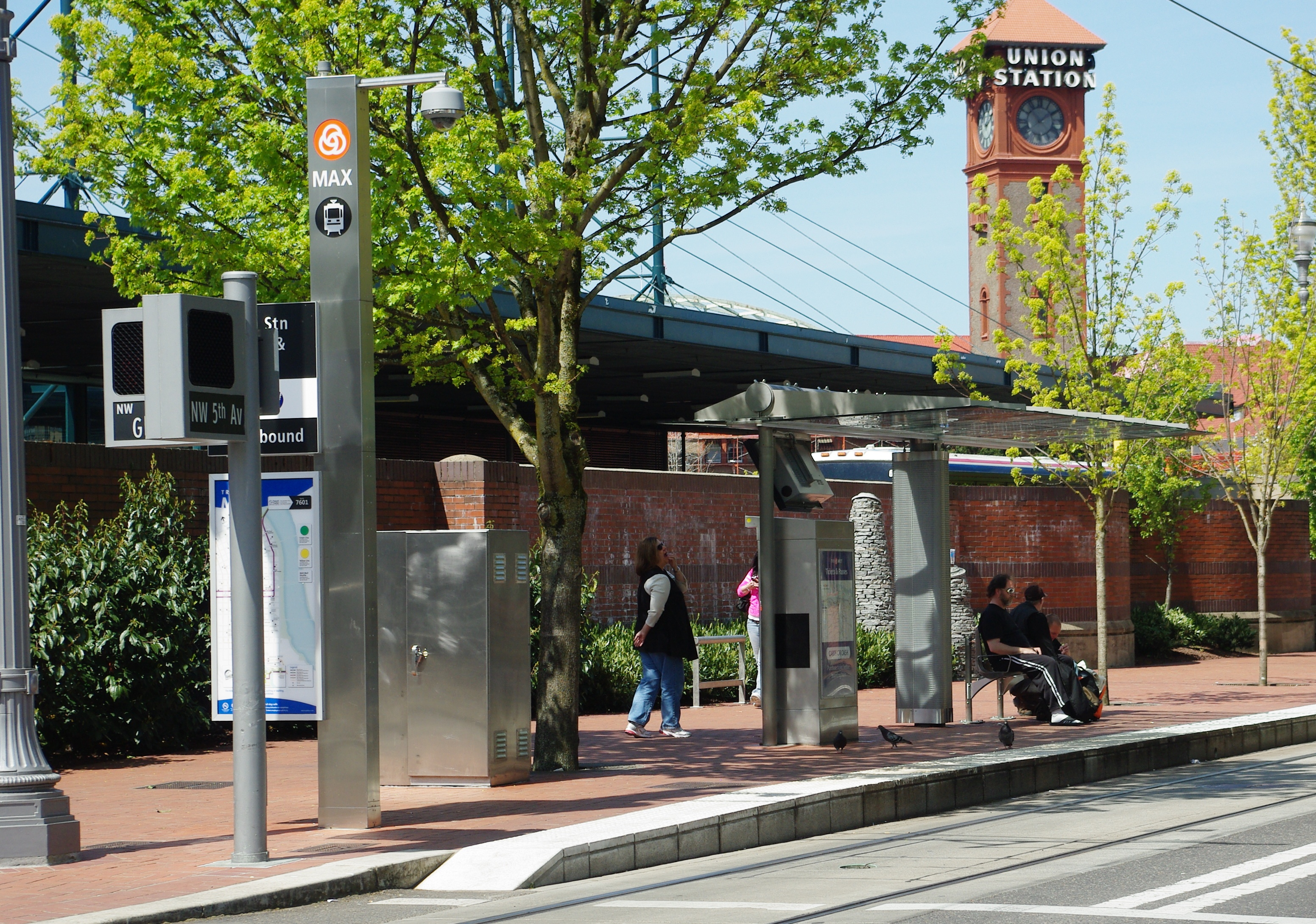
Union Station/NW 5th & Glisan station, where most southbound Yellow Line trains switch to Orange Line service

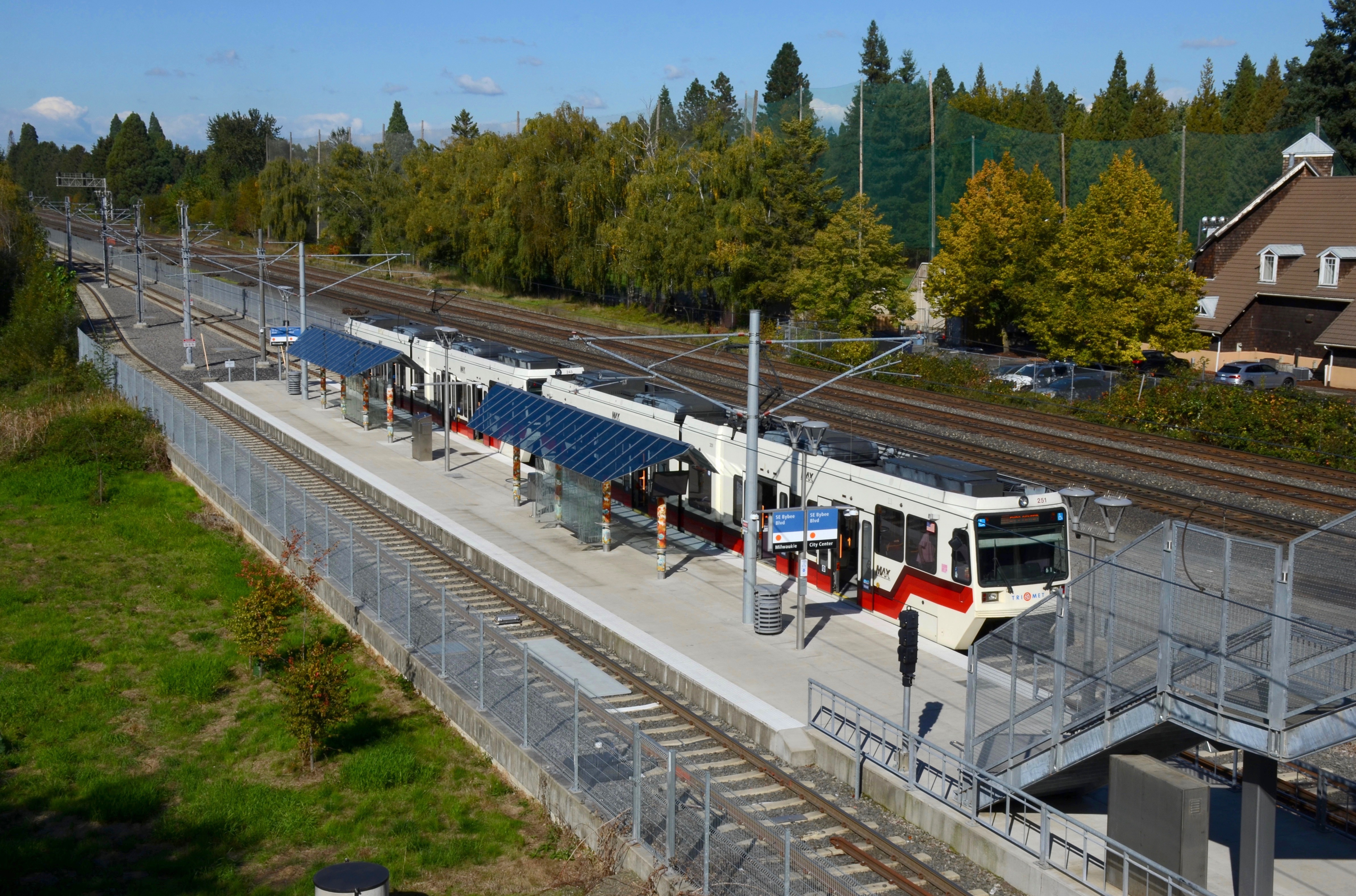
SE Bybee Blvd station

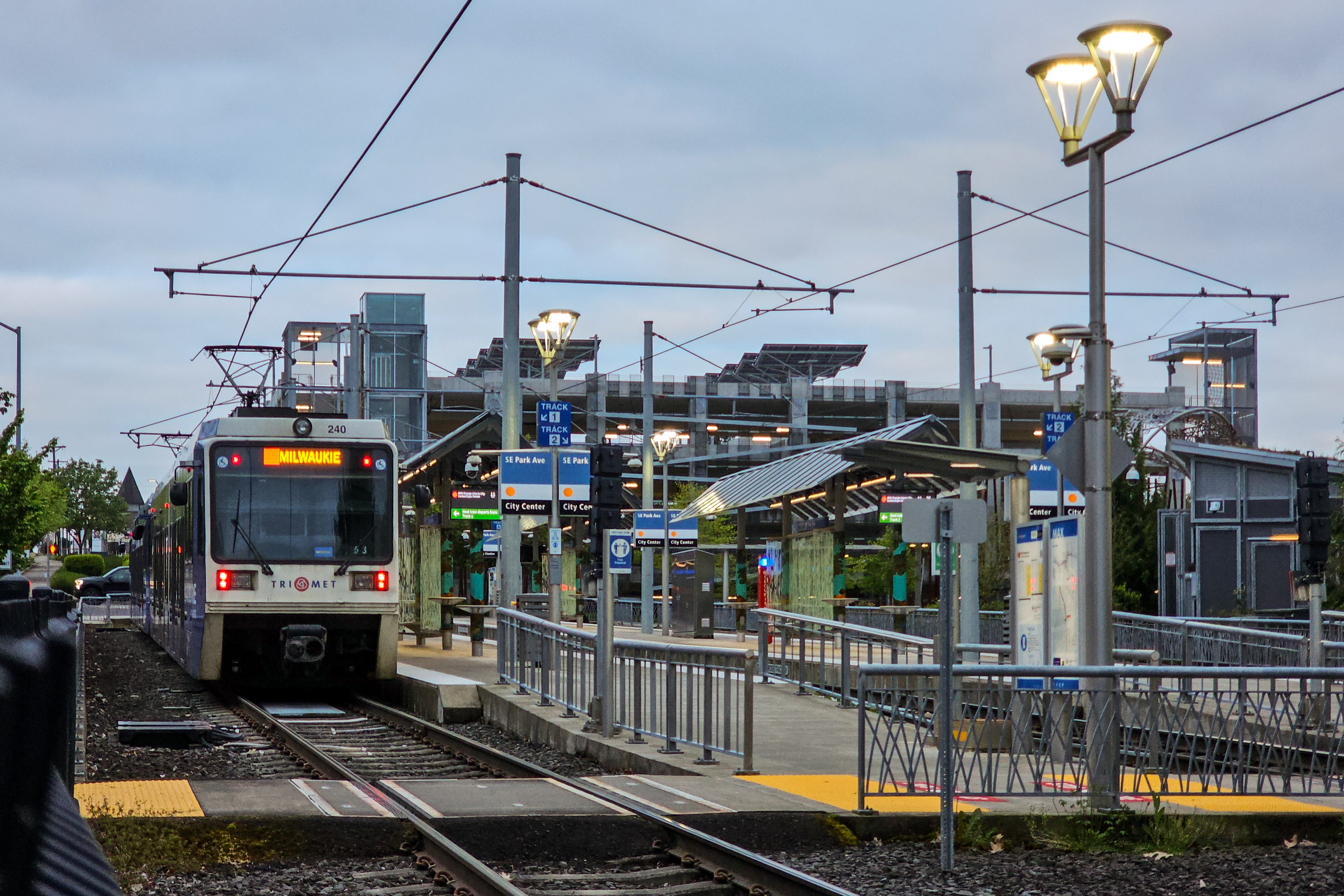
SE Park Ave station, the Orange Line's southern terminus

== Service ==
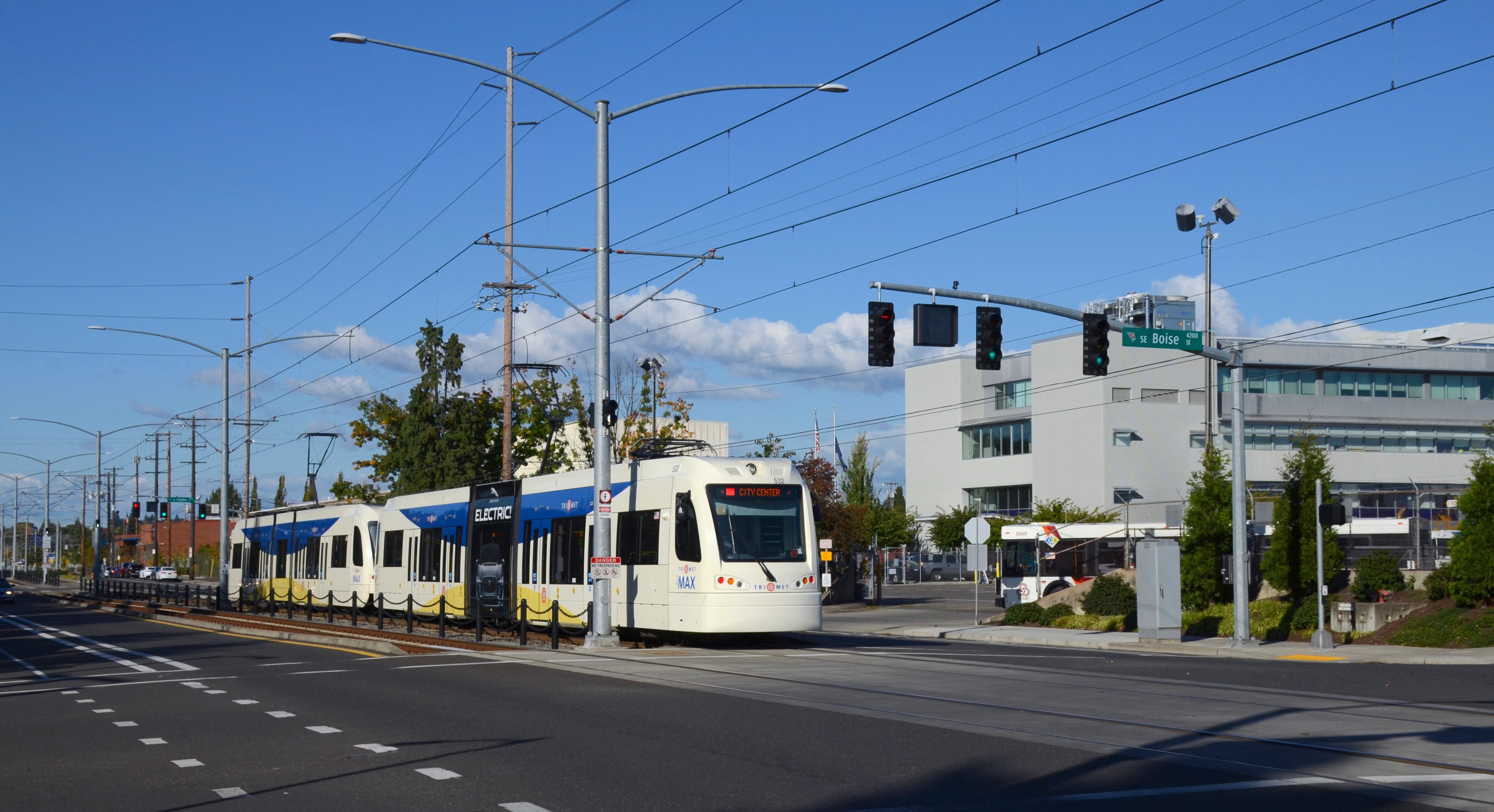
An Orange Line train along the median of Southeast 17th Avenue, passing TriMet's Operations Headquarters

TriMet designates the Orange Line as a "Frequent Service" route. During weekdays, Orange Line trains operate from 3:47 am to 12:35 am the next day with headways ranging from 30 minutes during the early mornings and late evenings to 15 minutes during peak hours. Service is reduced on weekends. End-to-end travel from Union Station/NW 5th & Glisan station to SE Park Ave station takes approximately 38 minutes. Upon departing Lincoln St/SW 3rd Ave station, most northbound Orange Line trains become Yellow Line trains bound for Expo Center station. Likewise, most Yellow Line trains become Orange Line trains bound for SE Park Ave station at Union Station.

In the late evenings when MAX ceases operating, the Orange Line is replaced by TriMet bus route 291–Orange Night Bus, which runs south from downtown Portland to Milwaukie following the Orange Line route. Two trips run on weekdays and one trip runs on Saturdays and Sundays.

=== Ridership ===
With an average weekday ridership of 5,025 in July 2025, the Orange Line is the least-busy MAX service. Due to the COVID-19 pandemic, service averaged 3,480 riders on weekdays in September 2020, down from 11,500 for the same month in 2019. Forecasts that were used to help justify federal funding for the project predicted an average of 17,000 weekday trips in 2016 but by October of that year, the Orange Line had carried fewer than 11,000 passengers.
