= Pioneer Courthouse/SW 6th and Pioneer Place/SW 5th stations =

Light rail stations in Portland, Oregon, U.S.

Pioneer Courthouse SW 6thPioneer Place SW 5th
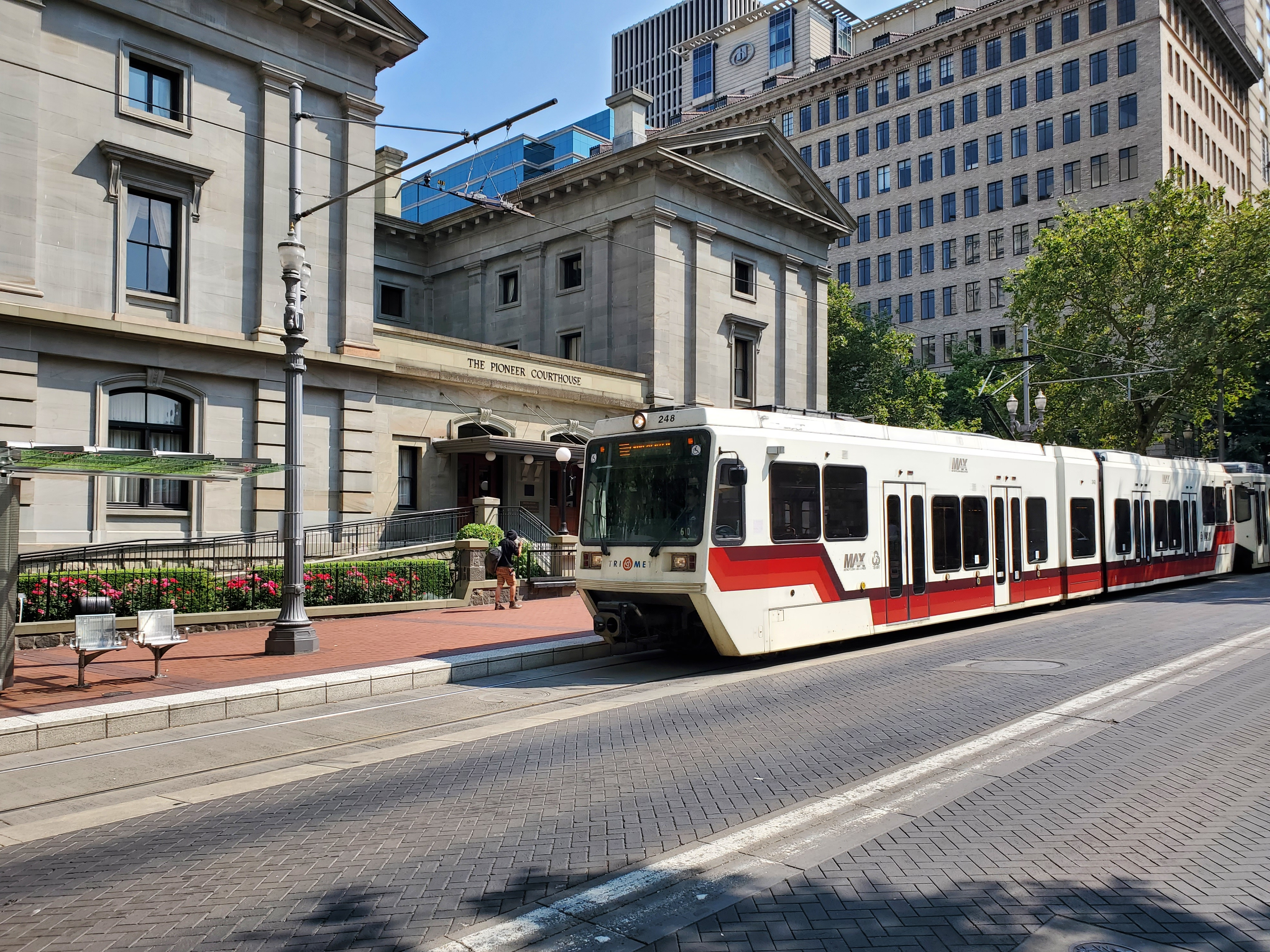
- A train at Pioneer Courthouse/Southwest 6th station

General information
- Location: Portland Transit Mall on Southwest 6th & Morrison (northbound) and Southwest 5th & Yamhill (southbound); Portland, Oregon, U.S.
- Coordinates: 45°31′07″N 122°40′42″W
- Owner: TriMet
- Platforms: 1 side platform per split
- Tracks: 1 per split
- Connections: Portland Transit Mall; 15; MAX Light Rail: Blue Line; Red Line at Pioneer Square stations

Construction
- Structure type: At-grade
- Accessible: yes

History
- Opened: August 30, 2009

Services
Preceding station	TriMet	Following station
Pioneer Courthouse/SW 6th
Southwest 6th & Madison One-way operation	Yellow Line	Southwest 6th & Pine toward Expo Center
Pioneer Place/SW 5th
City Hall/Southwest 5th & Jefferson toward SE Park Ave	Orange Line	Southwest 5th & Oak One-way operation
Former services
Preceding station	TriMet	Following station
Pioneer Courthouse/SW 6th
Southwest 6th & Madison One-way operation	Green Line 2009–2026	Northwest 6th & Davis toward Clackamas Town Center Transit Center
Southwest 6th & Madison One-way operation	Portland Vintage Trolley 2009-2014	Northwest 6th & Davis toward Union Station/NW 6th & Hoyt
Southwest 6th & Madison One-way operation	Mall Shuttle 2009–2011	Northwest 6th & Davis toward Union Station/NW 6th & Hoyt
Pioneer Place/SW 5th
City Hall/Southwest 5th & Jefferson toward PSU South/SW 5th & Jackson	Green Line 2009–2026	Northwest 6th & Davis One-way operation
City Hall/Southwest 5th & Jefferson toward PSU South/SW 5th & Jackson	Yellow Line 2009–2015	Northwest 6th & Davis One-way operation
City Hall/Southwest 5th & Jefferson toward PSU South/SW 5th & Jackson	Portland Vintage Trolley 2009-2014	Northwest 6th & Davis One-way operation
City Hall/Southwest 5th & Jefferson toward PSU Urban Center/SW 5th & Mill	Mall Shuttle 2009–2011	Northwest 6th & Davis One-way operation
Location

Pioneer Courthouse/SW 6th and Pioneer Place/SW 5th are a pair of light rail stations on the MAX Orange and Yellow Lines in Portland, Oregon. They are the 4th stop southbound on the Portland Transit Mall MAX extension. The Pioneer Courthouse/Southwest 6th station is served only by the Yellow Line, and the Pioneer Place/Southwest 5th station is served only by the Orange Line. Originally, from the opening of these stations in 2009 until 2015, the Yellow Line served both, but in September 2015 the then-new Orange Line replaced the Yellow Line at all southbound stations on the transit mall. As of August 2026, the Green Line was cut back to Gateway Transit Center and no longer serves either station.

The stations are built into the sidewalks of 5th and 6th Avenues, with the 5th Avenue platform heading southbound and the 6th Avenue platform northbound. The station connects with Blue and Red Line trains on the original downtown MAX tracks at the Pioneer Square South, Pioneer Square North, Mall/SW 4th Avenue, and Mall/SW 5th Avenue stations. Nearby points of interest include Pioneer Courthouse Square, Pioneer Place and the Pioneer Courthouse.

When opened on August 30, 2009, the stations were located in Fareless Square (within fare zone 1), which was renamed the Free Rail Zone four months later, but the fare-free zone was eliminated in 2012 when TriMet discontinued all use of fare zones.
