= SW 6th & Pine and SW 5th & Oak stations =

Light rail stations in Portland, Oregon

SW 6th & PineSW 5th & Oak
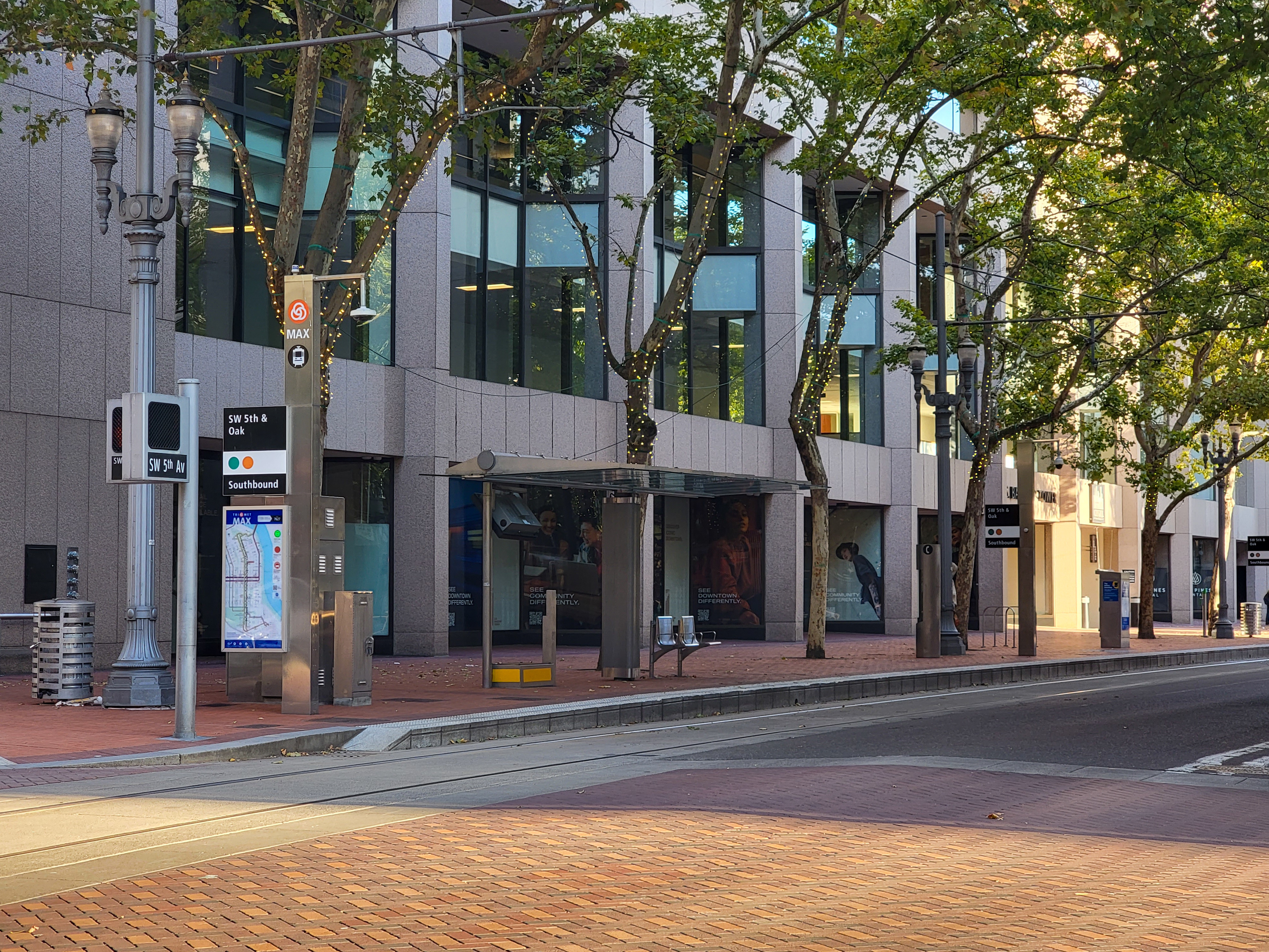
- Platform of SW 5th & Oak in October 2023

General information
- Location: SW 6th & Pine (northbound); SW 5th & Oak (southbound); Portland, Oregon; United States
- Coordinates: 45°31′19″N 122°40′35″W
- Owner: TriMet
- Tracks: 1 per split
- Bus routes: 291 - Orange Night Bus
- Connections: Portland Transit Mall; 1, 12, 16, 19, 20

Construction
- Accessible: yes

Services
Preceding station	TriMet	Following station
SW 6th & Pine Street
Pioneer Courthouse/SW 6th One-way operation	Yellow Line	Northwest 6th & Davis toward Expo Center
SW 5th & Oak Street
Pioneer Place/SW 5th toward SE Park Ave	Orange Line	Northwest 5th & Couch One-way operation
Former services
Preceding station	TriMet	Following station
SW 6th & Pine Street
Pioneer Courthouse/SW 6th One-way operation	Green Line 2009–2026	Northwest 6th & Davis toward Clackamas Town Center Transit Center
Pioneer Courthouse/SW 6th One-way operation	Portland Vintage Trolley 2009–2014	Northwest 6th & Davis toward Union Station/NW 6th & Hoyt
Pioneer Courthouse/SW 6th One-way operation	Mall Shuttle 2009–2011	Northwest 6th & Davis toward Union Station/NW 6th & Hoyt
SW 5th & Oak Street
Pioneer Place/SW 5th toward PSU South/SW 5th & Jackson	Green Line 2009–2026	Northwest 5th & Couch One-way operation
Pioneer Place/SW 5th toward PSU South/SW 5th & Jackson	Yellow Line 2009–2015	Northwest 5th & Couch One-way operation
Pioneer Place/SW 5th toward PSU South/SW 5th & Jackson	Portland Vintage Trolley 2009–2014	Northwest 5th & Couch One-way operation
Pioneer Place/SW 5th toward PSU Urban Center/SW 5th & Mill	Mall Shuttle 2009–2011	Northwest 5th & Couch One-way operation
Location

SW 6th & Pine and SW 5th & Oak are a pair of light rail stations on the MAX Orange and Yellow Lines in Portland, Oregon. It is the 3rd stop southbound on the Portland Transit Mall extension.

The stations are built into the sidewalks of 5th and 6th Avenues, with the 5th Avenue platform served by southbound trains and the 6th Avenue platform by northbound trains. The SW 6th & Pine station is served only by the Yellow Line, and the SW 5th & Oak station is served only by the Orange Line.Originally, from the opening of these stations in 2009 until 2015, the Yellow Line served both, but in September 2015 the then-new Orange Line replaced the Yellow Line at all southbound stations on the transit mall. The stations are located at the base of the US Bancorp Tower and connect to bus routes on the Transit Mall. As of August 2026, the Green Line was cut back to Gateway Transit Center and no longer serves either station.

At the time of their opening in August 2009, the stations were located in Fareless Square, which in January 2010 was renamed the Free Rail Zone. In 2012, the fare-free zone was discontinued, along with all fare zones on the TriMet system.
