= Albina/Mississippi station =

Light rail station in Portland, Oregon

Albina/Mississippi
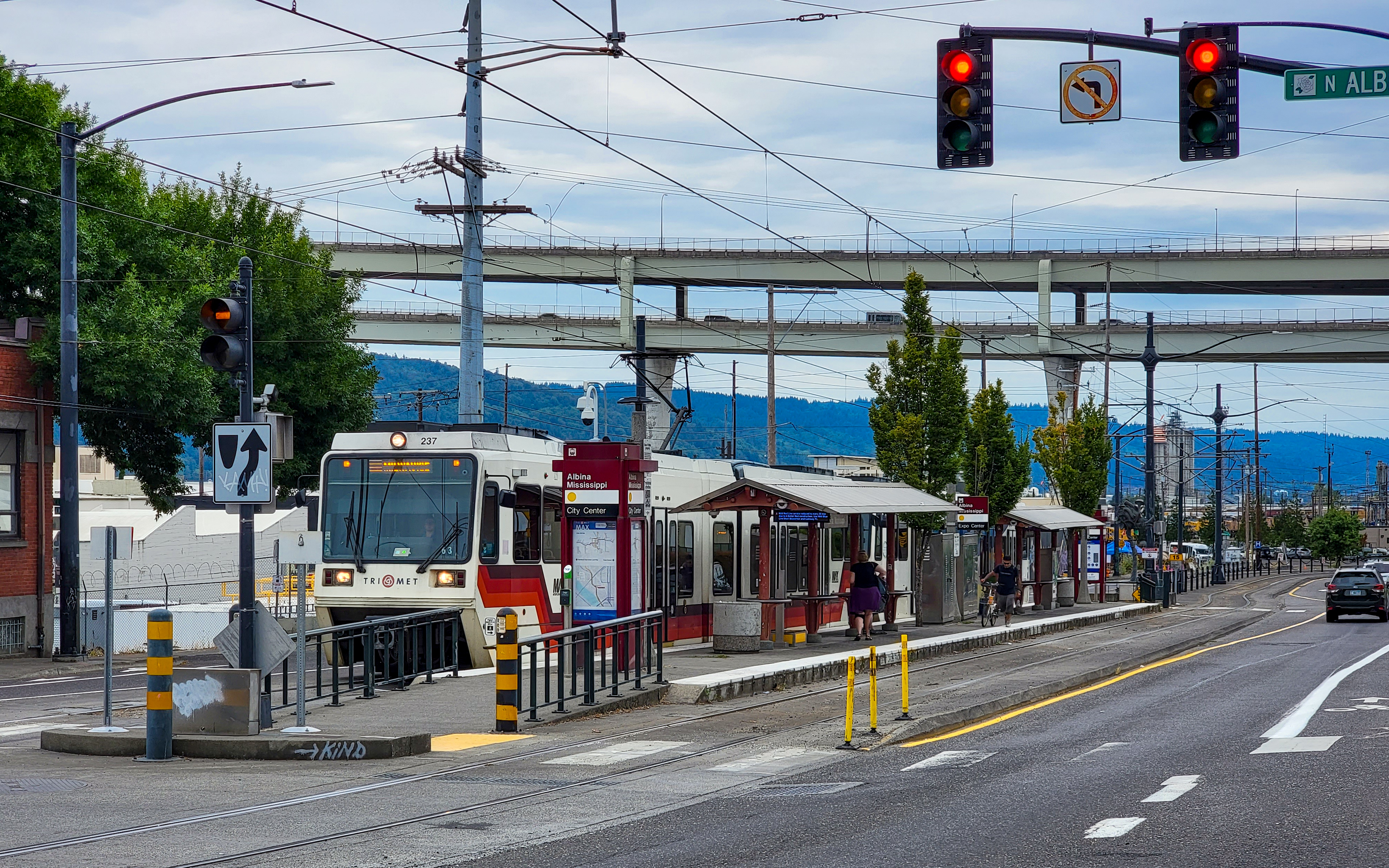
- A southbound train enters the station. The Fremont Bridge is in the background.

General information
- Location: 2599 North Interstate Ave; Portland, Oregon; USA
- Coordinates: 45°32′23″N 122°40′32″W
- Owner: TriMet
- Platforms: island platform
- Tracks: 2

Construction
- Cycle facilities: Bike lockers
- Accessible: yes

History
- Opened: May 1, 2004

Passengers
- Fall 2025: 402 (average weekday)

Services
Preceding station	TriMet	Following station
Interstate/Rose Quarter toward Union Station/NW 5th & Glisan	Yellow Line	Overlook Park toward Expo Center
Location

Albina/Mississippi station is a light rail station on the MAX Yellow Line in Portland, Oregon, United States. It is the second stop northbound on the Interstate MAX extension. The station is located in the median of Interstate Avenue near the intersection of N Albina Street. The station serves the Lower Albina Industrial District, Emanuel Hospital, and an emerging and redeveloping commercial district. The station is a center platform, with its main artistic theme drawing upon the lively jazz scene that thrived in Albina in the post-World War II era. During planning for Interstate MAX, this station was located at the intersection of Interstate Avenue and Russell Street. The Union Pacific Railroad raised concerns on conflicts between pedestrian and truck traffic at the Russell Street intermodal entrance to Albina Yard, which led designers to shift the station two blocks south.

== Bus line connections ==
This station is served by the following bus lines:

- 35 – Macadam/Greeley
- 40 – Tacoma/Swan Island
- 293 - Yellow Bus
