= NW 6th & Davis and NW 5th & Couch stations =

Light rail stations in Oregon, US

NW 6th & DavisNW 5th & Couch
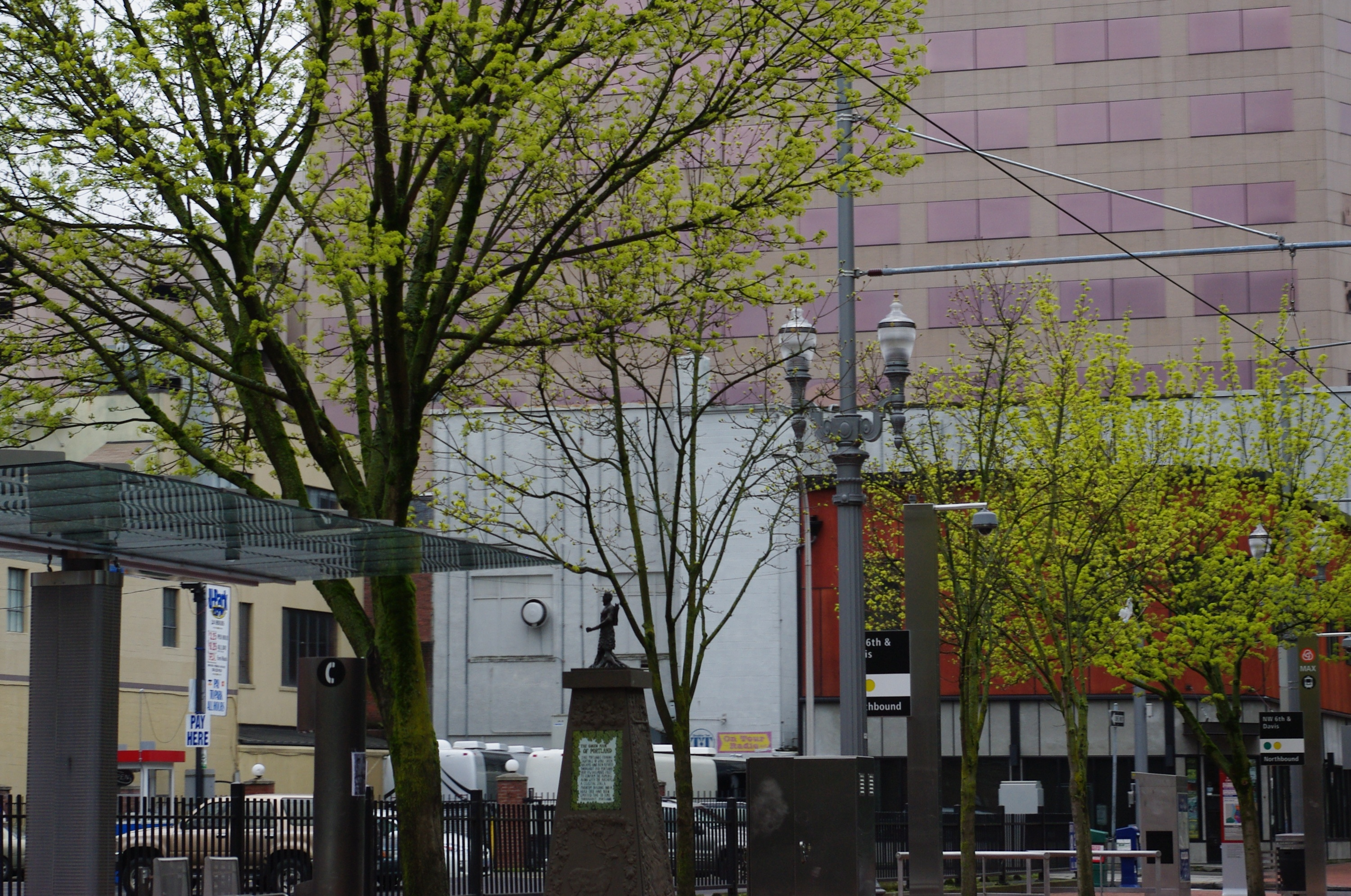
- NW 6th & Davis platform

General information
- Location: NW 6th & Davis (northbound); NW 5th & Couch (southbound); Portland, Oregon; United States
- Coordinates: 45°31′27″N 122°40′33″W
- Owner: TriMet
- Tracks: 1 per split
- Bus routes: 291 - Orange Night Bus
- Connections: Portland Transit Mall; 4, 8, 16, 35, 40, 44, 54, 77

Construction
- Accessible: yes

History
- Opened: August 2009

Services
Preceding station	TriMet	Following station
NW 6th & Davis Street
Southwest 6th & Pine One-way operation	Yellow Line	Union Station/NW 6th & Hoyt toward Expo Center
NW 5th & Couch Street
Southwest 5th & Oak toward SE Park Ave	Orange Line	Union Station/NW 5th & Glisan One-way operation
Former services
Preceding station	TriMet	Following station
NW 6th & Davis Street
Pioneer Courthouse/SW 6th One-way operation	Green Line 2009–2026	Union Station/NW 6th & Hoyt toward Clackamas Town Center Transit Center
Pioneer Courthouse/SW 6th One-way operation	Portland Vintage Trolley 2009–2014	Union Station/NW 6th & Hoyt Terminus
Pioneer Courthouse/SW 6th One-way operation	Mall Shuttle 2009–2011	Union Station/NW 6th & Hoyt Terminus
NW 5th & Couch Street
Southwest 5th & Oak toward PSU South/SW 5th & Jackson	Green Line 2009–2026	Union Station/NW 5th & Glisan One-way operation
Southwest 5th & Oak toward PSU South/SW 5th & Jackson	Yellow Line 2009–2015	Union Station/NW 5th & Glisan One-way operation
Southwest 5th & Oak toward PSU South/SW 5th & Jackson	Portland Vintage Trolley 2009–2014	Union Station/NW 5th & Glisan One-way operation
Southwest 5th & Oak toward PSU Urban Center/SW 5th & Mill	Mall Shuttle 2009–2011	Union Station/NW 5th & Glisan One-way operation
Location

NW 6th & Davis and NW 5th & Couch are a pair of light rail stations on the MAX Orange, and Yellow Lines in Portland, Oregon. It is the second stop southbound on the Portland Transit Mall extension.

The stations are built into the sidewalks of 5th and 6th Avenues, with the 5th Avenue platform served by southbound trains and the 6th Avenue platform by northbound trains. The NW 6th & Davis station is served only by the Yellow Line, and the NW 5th & Couch station is served only by the Orange Line. Originally, from the opening of these stations in 2009 until 2015, the Yellow Line served both, but in September 2015, the then-new Orange Line replaced the Yellow Line at all southbound stations on the transit mall. The stations are located in the Old Town Chinatown neighborhood. As of August 2026, the Green Line was cut back to Gateway Transit Center and no longer serves either station.

At the time of their opening in August 2009, the stations were located in Fareless Square, which in January 2010 was renamed the Free Rail Zone. In 2012, the fare-free zone was discontinued, along with all fare zones on the TriMet system.
