= Rosa Parks Station =

Rosa Parks Station may refer to the following public transportation stations:

- Rosa Parks Transit Center, Detroit, Michigan
- Rosa Parks Hempstead Transit Center, Hempstead, New York
- Rosa Parks Transit Station, Jacksonville, Florida
- Willowbrook/Rosa Parks station, Los Angeles, California
- Rosa Parks station (Paris), Paris, France
- Rosa Parks station (TriMet), Portland, Oregon
