= MAX Yellow Line (TriMet) =

Light rail line in Portland, Oregon

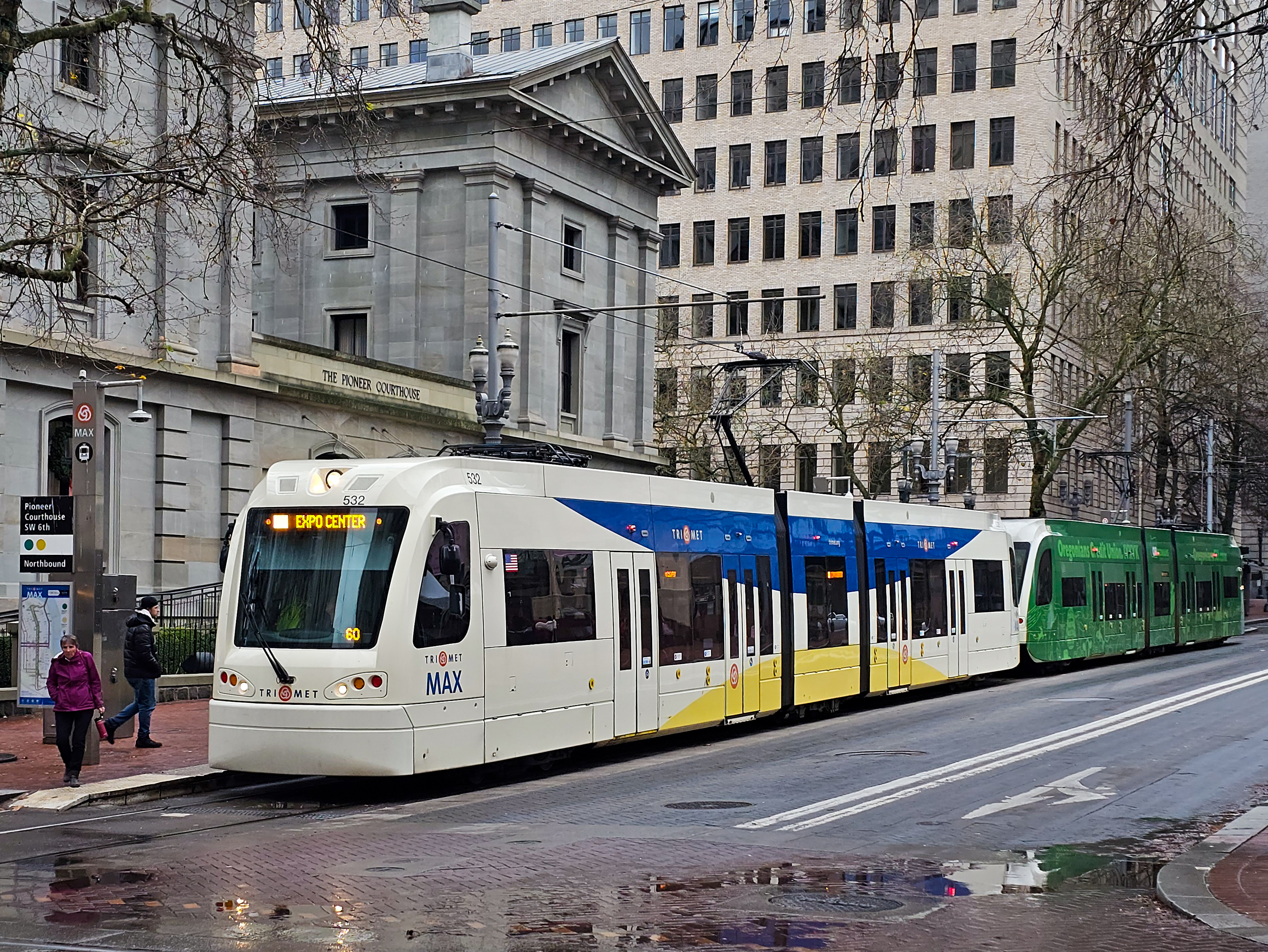
- A Yellow Line train at Pioneer Courthouse/SW 6th station on the Portland Transit Mall

Overview
- Other name: Interstate MAX
- Owner: TriMet
- Locale: Portland, Oregon, U.S.
- Termini: Expo Center (north); PSU South in downtown Portland (south)
- Stations: 17
- Website: MAX Yellow Line

Service
- Type: Light rail
- System: MAX Light Rail
- Operator: TriMet
- Daily ridership: 8,166 (2025, weekdays)

History
- Opened: May 1, 2004; 22 years ago

Technical
- Line length: 5.8 mi (9.3 km) (Note: TriMet publications only provide the total length of the Interstate MAX extension, i.e., the 5.8-mile (9.3 km) section that was newly built. The total length of Yellow Line service, which includes segments of the Eastside MAX and the Portland Transit Mall, is undetermined.)
- Num of tracks: 2
- Character: At-grade and elevated
- Track gauge: 4 ft 8 1/2 in (1,435 mm) standard gauge
- Electrification: Overhead line, 750 V DC

The MAX Yellow Line is a light rail line serving Portland, Oregon, United States. Operated by TriMet as part of MAX Light Rail, it connects North Portland, Portland City Center, and Portland State University (PSU). The line serves 17 stations; it runs north–south from Expo Center station to PSU South/Southwest 6th and College station, interlining with the Orange Line within the Portland Transit Mall. Service runs for 21 hours per day at frequencies of 15 to 30 minutes. The Yellow Line carried an average 8,166 riders per weekday in 2025.

After failing to secure funding for the South/North Corridor, a proposed light rail line between Clackamas County and Clark County, Washington, Portland business leaders and residents convinced TriMet to revive a portion of the project within North Portland along the median of Interstate Avenue. The ten-station, 5.8-mile (9.3 km) Interstate MAX extension began construction in 2001 and opened to Yellow Line service on May 1, 2004.

From its opening until 2009, the Yellow Line ran from Expo Center station in North Portland to the Library and Galleria stations in downtown Portland. In 2009, service was rerouted to the Portland Transit Mall, and since 2015, the Yellow Line has operated as a northbound through service of the Orange Line from PSU South/Southwest 6th and College station. Conversely, most southbound Yellow Line trains, which had served the other half of the transit mall on 5th Avenue from 2009 to 2015, operate through to the Orange Line from Union Station/Northwest 5th & Glisan station.

== History ==
=== Early proposals ===
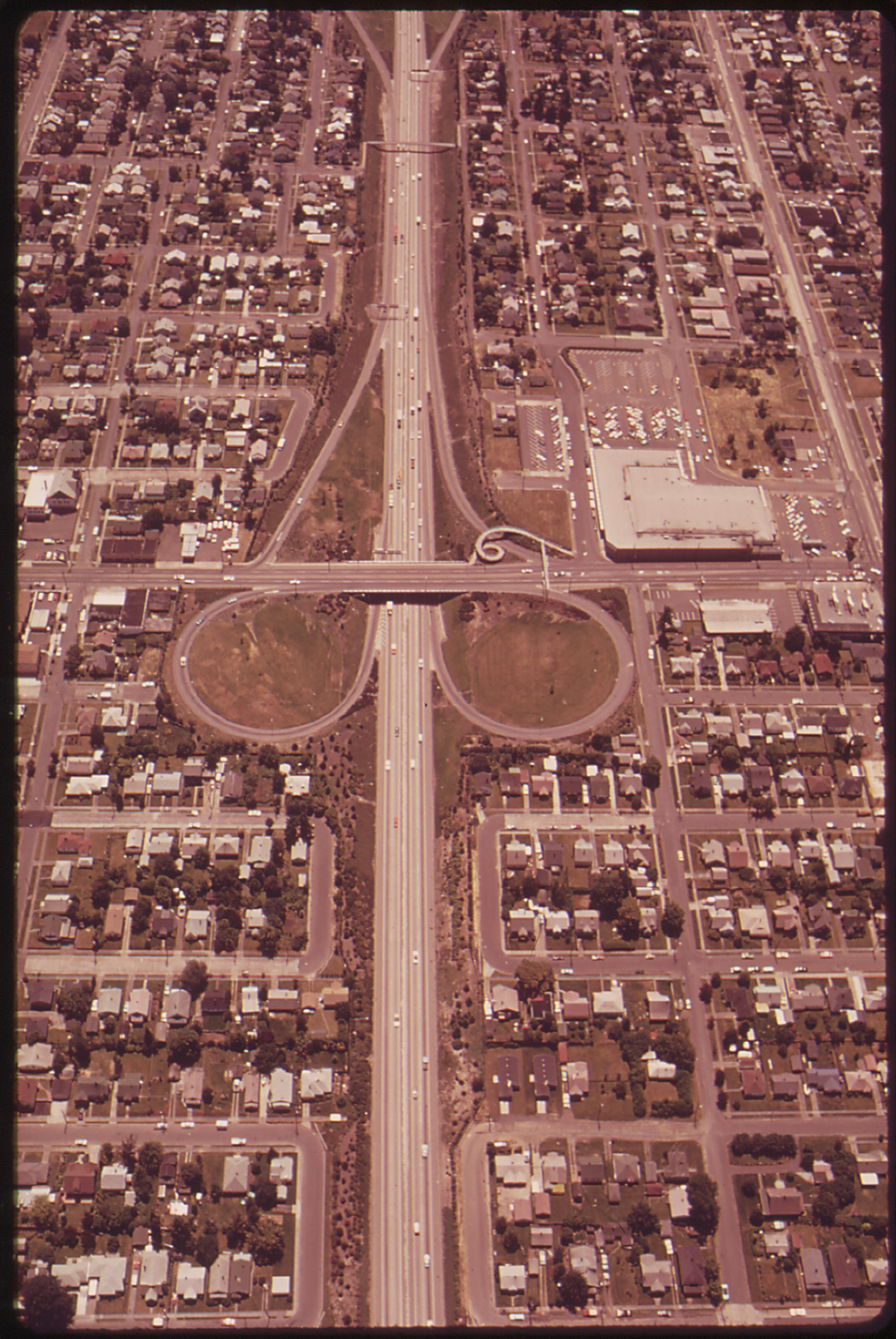
An aerial view of Interstate 5 (near center) and Interstate Avenue (upper right) in 1973, facing south

Proposals for a light rail line through North Portland, across the Columbia River, and into Vancouver, Washington, were considered as early as the 1980s. A study by staff of the Portland metropolitan area's regional government, Metro, in 1985 examined the feasibility of a line alongside Interstate 5 (I-5) or along the median of Interstate Avenue but concluded that no light rail alternative would "'pay back' within the useful life of the project". A different report completed in 1986, however, noted that light rail along the corridor would be "promising". In 1988, Portland city planners proposed a northside rail service as part of Portland's Central City and Albina Community plans; they sought to extend the region's then-two-year-old light rail system, the Metropolitan Area Express (MAX), via Interstate Avenue, I-5, or Martin Luther King Jr. Boulevard (formerly Union Avenue). While serving on the Senate Committee on Appropriations, U.S. Senators Mark Hatfield of Oregon and Brock Adams of Washington combined this proposal with a greater Vancouver–Portland–Oregon City light rail plan that Metro separately developed, for which the committee appropriated $2 million to study in 1989.

Preliminary alignment studies north to Vancouver and Clark County, including an additional proposal for a line between Vancouver Mall and Clackamas Town Center along I-205, commenced shortly after. Metro's Joint Policy Advisory Committee on Transportation (JPACT) identified a 25-mile (40 km) route from Hazel Dell through downtown Portland to Clackamas Town Center in 1994 that TriMet formally named the "South/North Corridor". That November, Metro asked Portland area voters if they would approve a $475 million bond measure to cover Oregon's portion of the project's estimated $2.8 billion cost; the measure passed by 63 percent. Across the river, Clark County officials proposed a 0.3 percent increase in sales and vehicle excise taxes to provide Washington's $237.5 million share; voters turned it down by 69 percent on February 7, 1995.

Amid fears that ridership would not justify a North Portland segment if Clark County were excluded, JPACT scaled back the project and released a second plan that would only build the line between the Rose Quarter and Clackamas Town Center. To fill the funding gap that resulted from the exclusion of Clark County, the Oregon House of Representatives passed a $750 million transportation package that included $375 million for the project. The Oregon Supreme Court promptly struck down this funding due to the inclusion of unrelated measures, which violated the state's constitution. In February 1996, state legislators revised the package, but light rail opponents forced a statewide vote in November that ultimately prevented the use of state funds. In an effort to regain the support of North Portland residents, who had historically voted in favor of light rail, and to avoid seeking state funding, JPACT announced a third plan in February 1997 that reinstated a segment within North Portland, a 15-mile (24 km) line from Lombard Street to Clackamas Town Center. A few months later, the Portland City Council extended this proposed alignment through North Portland so that it would terminate another mile north of Lombard Street in Kenton. That July, Metro advanced the final environmental studies for a line that would run 16 miles (26 km) between Kenton and Clackamas Town Center in its first phase, with a potential to extend it 21 miles (34 km) up to Clark County should financing be acquired. Due to the wording on the original ballot passed in 1994, which described the project extending into Clark County, regional transit agency TriMet elected to reaffirm voter support by drafting a new $475 million bond measure. Portland area residents cast their vote on November 3, 1998, and those against the measure narrowly defeated it, 52 percent to 48 percent.

=== Revival and construction ===
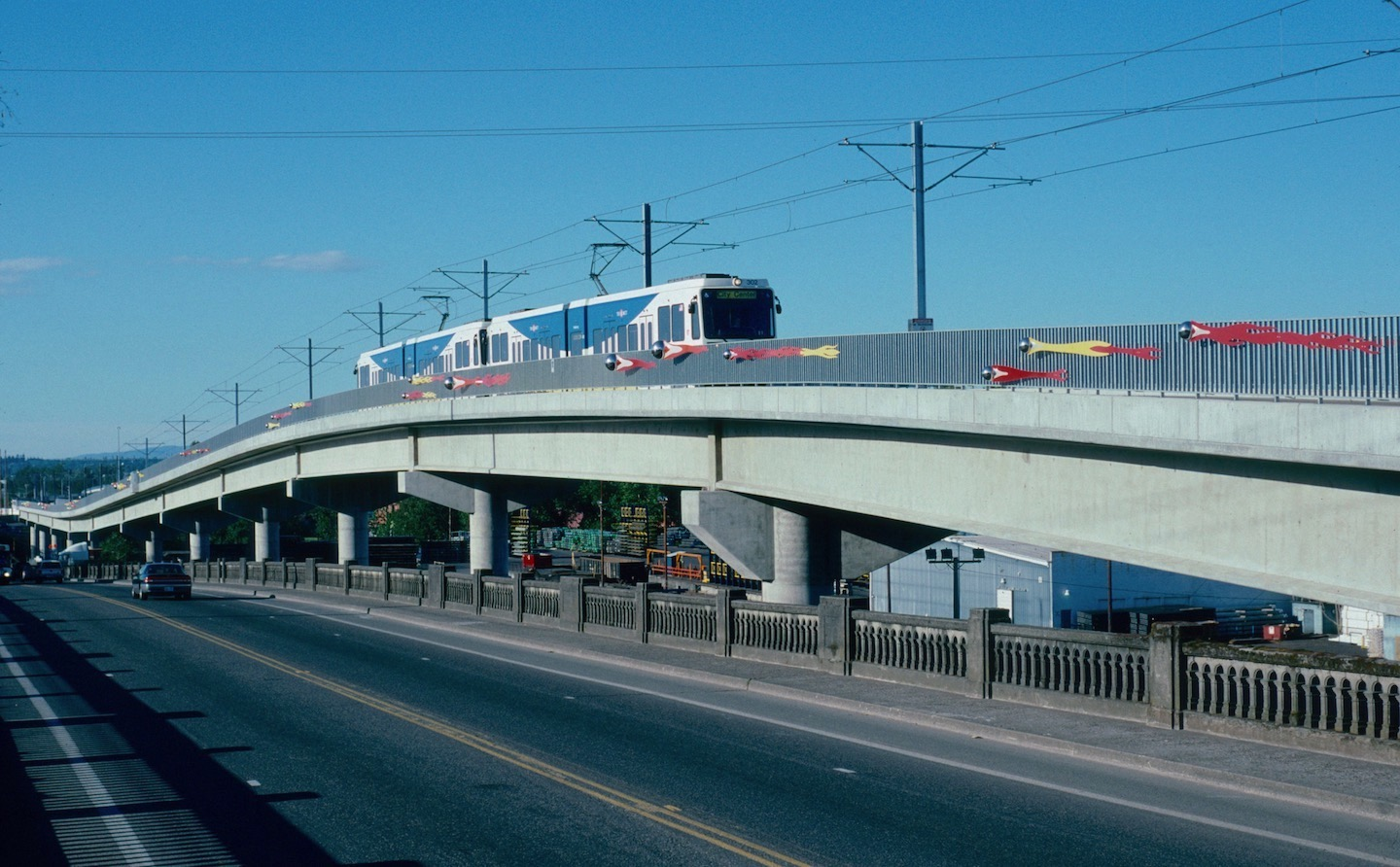
The long viaduct north of Argyle Street built for the Interstate MAX, seen on the second day of service

In 1999, North Portland residents and city business leaders urged TriMet to revive the South/North Corridor's northern portion but without the Clark County segment; they argued that 81 percent of Multnomah County voters had wanted light rail. TriMet agreed and developed a proposal to build a line along the median of Interstate Avenue, between the Portland Expo Center and the Rose Quarter. Meetings and polls conducted in June of that year determined that locals overwhelmingly supported the project, which organizers began calling the "Interstate MAX", as long as it was less expensive than the South/North project, did not displace residents from their homes, and did not require any new taxes. The city council subsequently endorsed the proposal.

TriMet projected the cost of the Interstate MAX at $350 million. To build it without the need for a significant new source of local funding, the city created an urban renewal district surrounding the alignment and adopted the Interstate Corridor urban renewal area (ICURA) plan in August 2000. This covered an expansive 3,744-acre (1,515 ha) area within 10 neighborhoods and directed $30 million in tax increment funds towards the project. That same year, TriMet and the city completed funding the Airport MAX and Central City Streetcar projects without requesting any federal assistance; TriMet declared them part of the Interstate MAX project, providing $257.5 million in matching federal funds that the Federal Transit Administration approved in September. TriMet and Metro contributed $38.5 million and $24 million respectively to the remaining balance, sourced from their own general transportation funds.

Construction of the Interstate MAX began in February 2001 with a ceremony held near the Rose Quarter. Initial work on the line's junction with the Eastside MAX, located near the east end of the Steel Bridge, required a 16-day closure of the Eastside MAX segment between Rose Quarter Transit Center and Old Town/Chinatown station, during which buses shuttled riders between the two stations. In April, TriMet contracted Stacy and Witbeck to lay tracks between the Rose Quarter and Kenton and build a new vehicular overpass in Lower Albina. Meanwhile, the agency awarded the section between Kenton and the Expo Center, which included the construction of a 3,850-foot-long (1,173 m) dual-track bridge north of Argyle Street, to F.E. Ward Constructors. The rapid pace of construction, which workers credited to improvements in track-laying and street reconstruction technology learned from previous MAX projects, hit a halfway point in April 2002. TriMet marked this milestone with a concrete pouring ceremony at the line's intersection with Portland Boulevard. Workers completed road and sidewalk improvements the following November, six months ahead of schedule. In August 2003, with construction approximately 80 percent complete, TriMet officials announced the line's targeted opening for the following spring, months earlier than the previously anticipated September commencement. Line testing began in February 2004 and continued up to the extension's inauguration.

=== Opening and service realignment ===
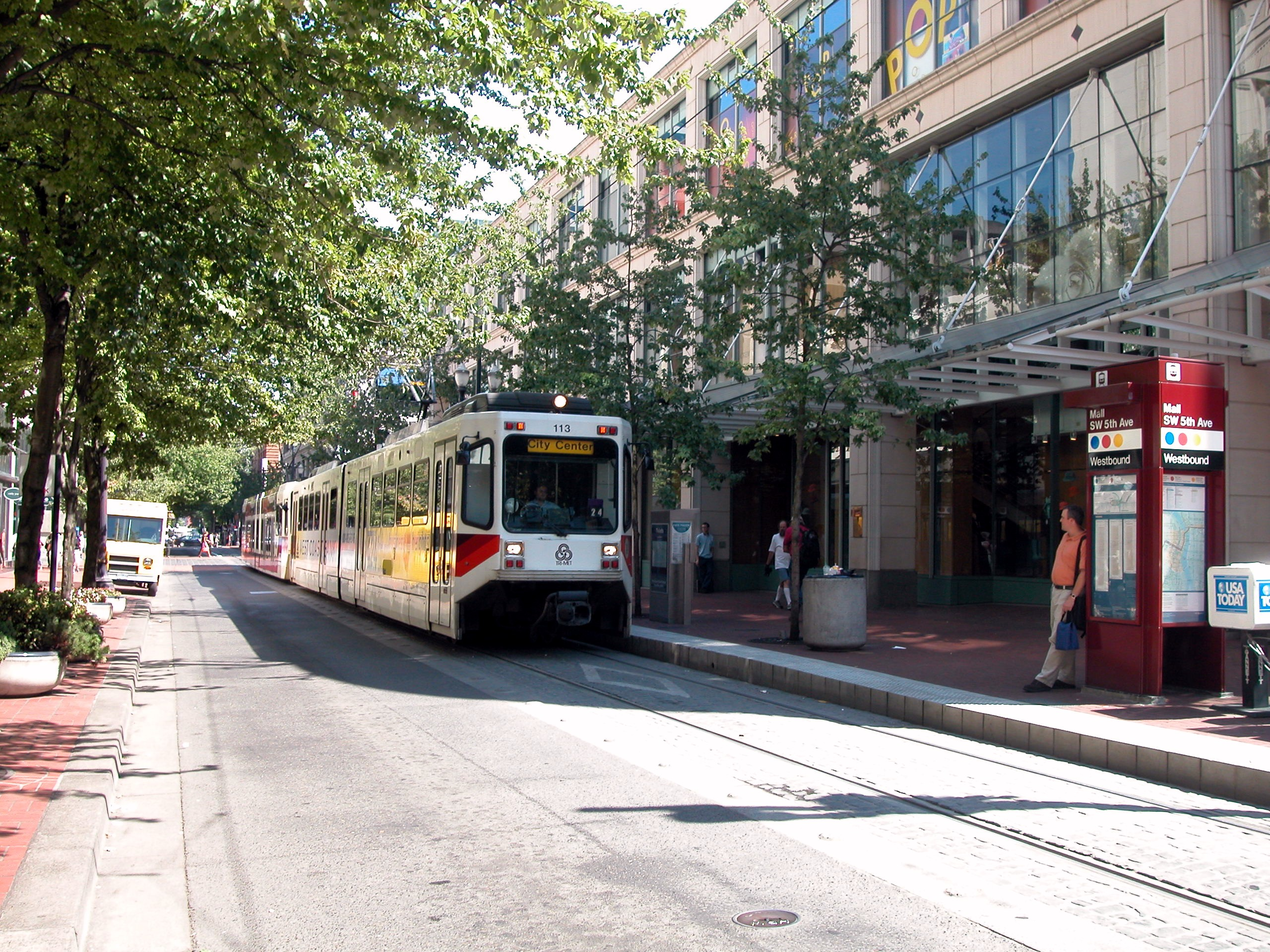
A Yellow Line train on its former Southwest Morrison Street alignment in 2004, approaching the now-closed Mall/SW 5th Ave station

The 5.8-mile (9.3 km) Interstate MAX extension opened on May 1, 2004, four months ahead of schedule and $25 million under budget. TriMet created a new MAX service called the "Yellow Line", which ran from Expo Center station in North Portland to the Library and Galleria stations in downtown Portland, turning around at the 11th Avenue tracks; it followed First Avenue and Morrison and Yamhill streets upon entry into downtown, serving this segment alongside the Blue and Red lines. The Yellow Line replaced TriMet bus route 5–Interstate. Over 20,000 people attended opening day celebrations, and TriMet offered free rides for two days. The presence of the line spurred redevelopment along the corridor, including new investments from Fred Meyer and New Seasons Market.

On August 30, 2009, TriMet rerouted the Yellow Line to begin serving the light rail tracks added to the rebuilt Portland Transit Mall, with the PSU Urban Center stations as its interim southern termini. The agency had placed the construction of the intended PSU South termini on hold as it awaited transit-oriented development projects in the area to finish. The PSU South stations opened in September 2012. Following the completion of the Portland–Milwaukie Light Rail Project, which extended MAX to Milwaukie, the Yellow Line became partially interlined with the new Orange Line. TriMet claimed separating the lines would allow it to better control service frequencies from North Portland and Milwaukie to downtown Portland, as it expected higher ridership along the Orange Line. It also anticipated few riders from these communities traveling beyond the city center. Most Orange Line trains subsequently took over operating the southbound 5th Avenue segment of the transit mall on September 12, 2015.

== Planned extension to Vancouver, Washington ==
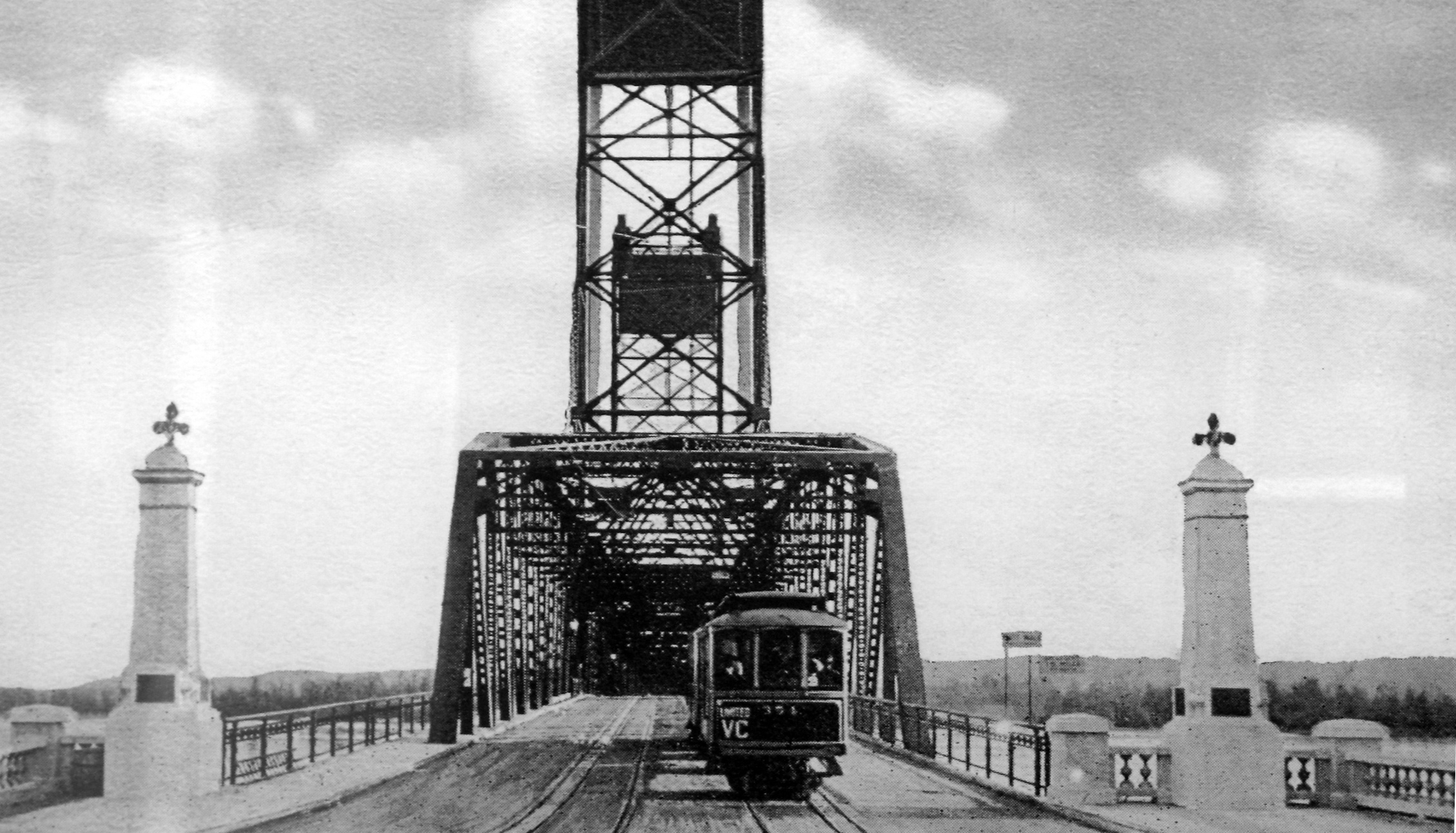
A Vancouver line streetcar seen crossing the Columbia River via the Interstate Bridge in 1917

Passenger rail service once operated between Portland and Vancouver, Washington. In October 1888, the Portland and Vancouver Railway Company opened a steam dummy line called the "Vancouver line". The Vancouver line's tracks initially ran from the corner of First and Washington streets in downtown Portland north to Hayden Island, where Vancouver-bound passengers transferred to a ferry to continue across the Columbia River. The line was electrified in 1892 following its acquisition by the Portland Consolidated Street Railway. The first Interstate Bridge, built in 1917, finally extended the tracks across the river and replaced the ferry service. The Vancouver line remained operational as part of the Portland Railway, Light and Power Company until its closure in September 1940.

Regional planners in Oregon considered restoring rail service to Vancouver in 1974, when TriMet proposed a light rail line at the same time Governor Tom McCall's task force studied options for allocating federal assistance funds diverted from the canceled Mount Hood Freeway project. Then in 1984, a bi-state advisory committee revisited the concept, envisioning 8,000 commuters from Clark County by the year 2000. Both proposals were shelved due to feasibility issues and a lack of funding. Following the South/North project's initial defeat, planning for a separate North Portland to Clark County segment continued. New studies were conducted to evaluate the feasibility of a light rail-only bridge or tunnel, while other studies suggested light rail on a third vehicular bridge, an idea that had been considered since the late 1980s. An environmental study released in February 1998 for the South/North project's third iteration included an option for a low bridge with a lift span, but a decision was made to reserve the option for a later phase.

In 2004, Oregon and Washington began efforts to replace the Interstate Bridge, citing the bridge's declining structural integrity and worsening congestion. This culminated in the Columbia River Crossing project in 2008. The project would have replaced the bridge and extended MAX further north from the Expo Center through Hayden Island and across the Columbia River to downtown Vancouver and Clark College, adding seven new stations along 2.9 miles (4.7 km) of new track. Planners projected the extension to cost upwards of $3.5 billion (equivalent to $4.93 billion in 2025 dollars). In June 2013, three months after the Oregon Legislature authorized $450 million in state funding, the Washington State Senate declined to fund Washington's share, with opponents citing the inclusion of light rail as a common reason for rejecting the proposal. The states terminated the project in March 2014.

A light rail extension into Clark County remains part of Metro's 2018 Regional Transportation Plan for 2040. The plan assumes a cost of $4.1 billion for the entire project, of which $3.1 billion would be used to replace the Interstate Bridge, $80 million to build a second bridge connecting Hayden Island to Portland Expo Center, and $850 million for the remainder of the extension. The Southwest Washington Regional Transportation Council also includes the light rail corridor in their own 2040 plan.

As part of the ongoing Interstate Bridge Replacement Program, the Yellow Line is expected to be extended into Vancouver, to the proposed Vancouver Waterfront station and ultimately to Evergreen Boulevard.

== Route ==
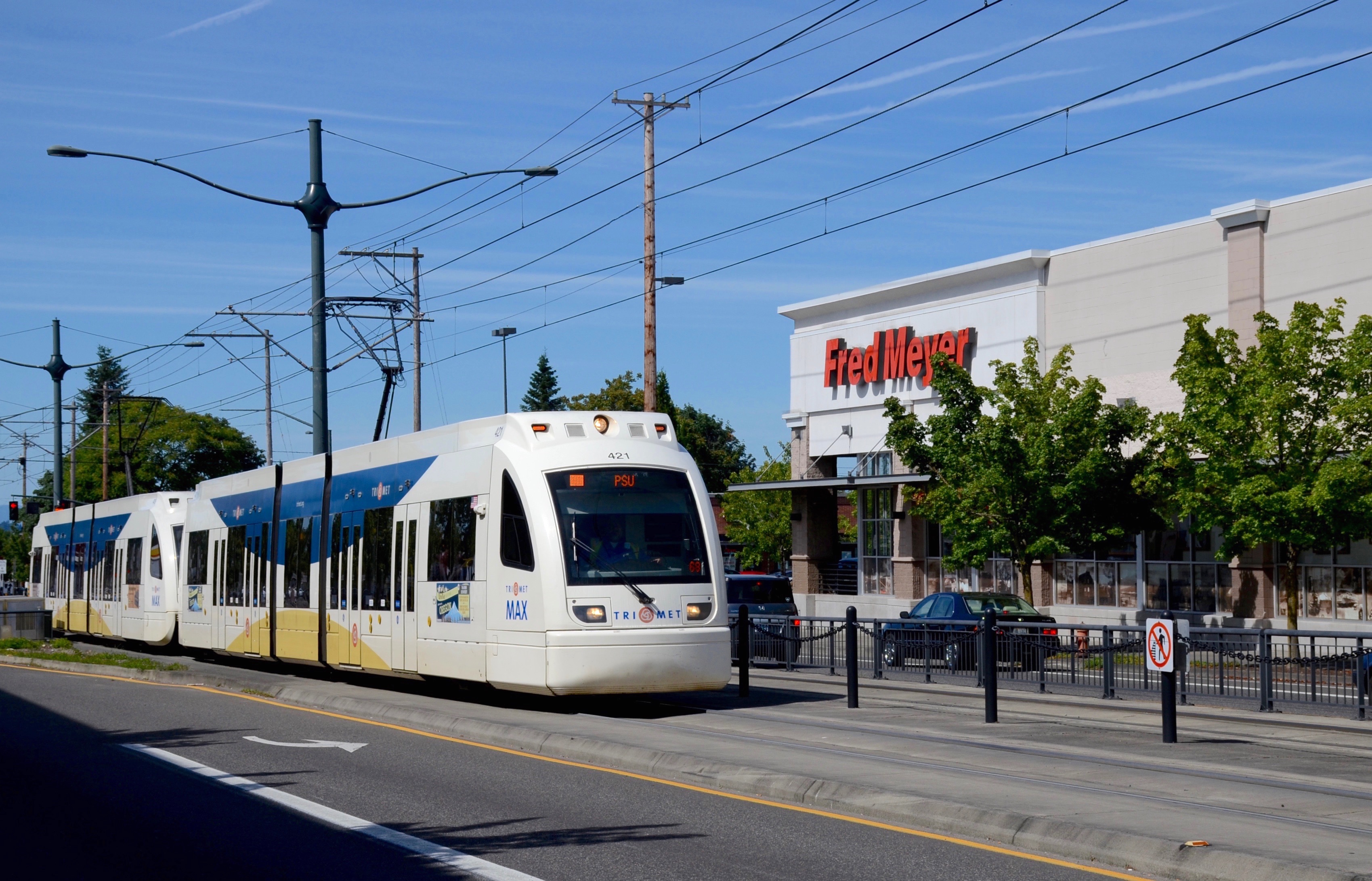
MAX near the intersection of Interstate Avenue and Lombard Street

The Yellow Line serves the 5.8-mile-long (9.3 km) Interstate MAX segment. It begins at Expo Center station, which occupies the east end of the Portland Expo Center parking lot. From there, the line heads south following Expo Road. At Delta Park/Vanport station, it become elevated as part of a 3,850-foot-long (1,170 m) viaduct, which crosses over Victory Boulevard, Interstate Avenue, the Columbia Slough, and Columbia Boulevard and ends at a level crossing on Argyle Street. Just south of Kenton/North Denver Avenue station, the tracks enter the median of Interstate Avenue and proceed south towards Interstate/Rose Quarter station at the Rose Quarter. The Interstate MAX ends where it connects with the Eastside MAX segment near the east end of the Steel Bridge. Yellow Line trains continue west across the Willamette River and into downtown Portland via the Glisan Street ramp. A wye just south of Union Station splits the double-tracks to establish the northern end of the Portland Transit Mall on 5th and 6th avenues.

On the Portland Transit Mall, southbound Yellow Line trains operate through into the Orange Line bound for Milwaukie at Union Station/Northwest 5th & Glisan station on 5th Avenue. Conversely, Yellow Line trains serve the northbound 6th Avenue segment as through-routed continuations of the Orange Line from PSU South/Southwest 6th and College station. Near PSU Urban Center/Southwest 6th & Montgomery station, MAX tracks cross with the Portland Streetcar, which serves a stop on Mill Street. Between the Pioneer Courthouse and Pioneer Courthouse Square at Pioneer Courthouse/Southwest 6th station, the 6th Avenue MAX line intersects with east–west MAX lines on Yamhill and Morrison streets, facilitating a transfer to the Pioneer Square South and Pioneer Square North stations. The line continues northward, entering Northwest Portland after passing Burnside Street, eventually reaching the north end of the transit mall at Union Station/Northwest 6th and Hoyt station.

From its opening in 2004 until 2009, the Yellow Line followed the Eastside MAX alignment from the east end of the Steel Bridge to the 11th Avenue tracks in downtown Portland, serving the stations from Old Town/Chinatown to Library and Galleria alongside Blue and Red line trains. It was rerouted to the Portland Transit Mall in August 2009 after the addition of light rail to 5th and 6th avenues.

A geographic map of the MAX Yellow Line (in red) relative to the rest of the network (in black) with icons marking the line's termini. The official system schematic can be viewed on the TriMet website.

=== Stations ===
The Interstate MAX project added ten stations to the MAX system, from Expo Center to Interstate/Rose Quarter. Of these stations, seven occupy the median of Interstate Avenue, giving the segment its name. The Yellow Line serves a total of 17 stations, including these ten, as well as seven stations along the northbound segment of the Portland Transit Mall on 6th Avenue in downtown Portland. Transfers to the Orange Line, which runs southbound from Union Station in downtown Portland to Southeast Park Avenue station in Oak Grove, can be made at any of the seven stations along the transit mall's 5th Avenue alignment, although most southbound Yellow Line trains operate through into the Orange Line.

Riders can transfer from Pioneer Courthouse/Southwest 6th station to the Blue and Red lines at the Pioneer Square stations, and from Interstate/Rose Quarter station to the Blue and Red lines at the Rose Quarter Transit Center. Other connections include Amtrak near Union Station/Northwest 6th & Hoyt station, the Portland Streetcar at PSU Urban Center/Southwest 6th & Montgomery station, Frequent Express (FX) along the Portland Transit Mall, and local and intercity bus services at several stops across the line.

Key
Icon	Purpose
↑	Northbound travel only (Note: Most Yellow Line trains on the Portland Transit Mall travel northbound only. Most southbound trains operate through into the Orange Line bound for Southeast Park Avenue in Milwaukie at Union Station/Northwest 5th & Hoyt.)

List of MAX Yellow Line stations
Station	Connections	Began service	Location
Expo Center		May 1, 2004	North; Portland
Delta Park/Vanport		May 1, 2004	North; Portland
Kenton/N Denver Ave		May 1, 2004	North; Portland
N Lombard Transit Center		May 1, 2004	North; Portland
Rosa Parks		May 1, 2004	North; Portland
N Killingsworth St		May 1, 2004	North; Portland
N Prescott St		May 1, 2004	North; Portland
Overlook Park		May 1, 2004	North; Portland
Albina/Mississippi		May 1, 2004	North; Portland
Interstate/Rose Quarter	Blue Line (at Rose Quarter Transit Center); Red Line (at Rose Quarter Transit Center)	May 1, 2004	North; Portland
↓ Most southbound trains become the Orange Line at Union Station/NW 5th & Glisan. ↓
Union Station/NW 6th & Hoyt↑	Orange Line (at Union Station/NW 5th & Glisan); Amtrak (at Portland Union Station); FX2–Division	August 31, 2009	Portland Transit Mall
NW 6th & Davis↑	Orange Line (at NW 5th & Couch); FX2–Division	August 31, 2009	Portland Transit Mall
SW 6th & Pine↑	Orange Line (at SW 5th & Oak); FX2–Division	August 31, 2009	Portland Transit Mall
Pioneer Courthouse/SW 6th↑	Blue Line (at Pioneer Square North and Pioneer Square South); Red Line (at Pioneer Square North and Pioneer Square South); Orange Line (at Pioneer Place/SW 5th); FX2–Division	August 31, 2009	Portland Transit Mall
SW 6th & Madison↑	Orange Line (at City Hall/SW 5th & Jefferson); FX2–Division	August 31, 2009	Portland Transit Mall
PSU Urban Center/SW 6th & Montgomery↑	Orange Line (at PSU Urban Center/SW 5th & Mill); A Loop (at PSU Urban Center); B Loop (at SW 5th & Market and SW 5th & Montgomery); NS Line (at PSU Urban Center, SW 5th & Market, and SW 5th & Montgomery); FX2–Division	August 31, 2009	Portland Transit Mall
PSU South/SW 6th and College↑	Orange Line (at PSU South/SW 5th & Jackson); FX2–Division	September 2, 2012	Portland Transit Mall
↑ Most northbound Orange Line trains become the Yellow Line at PSU South/SW 6th and College. ↑

Images of MAX Yellow Line stations
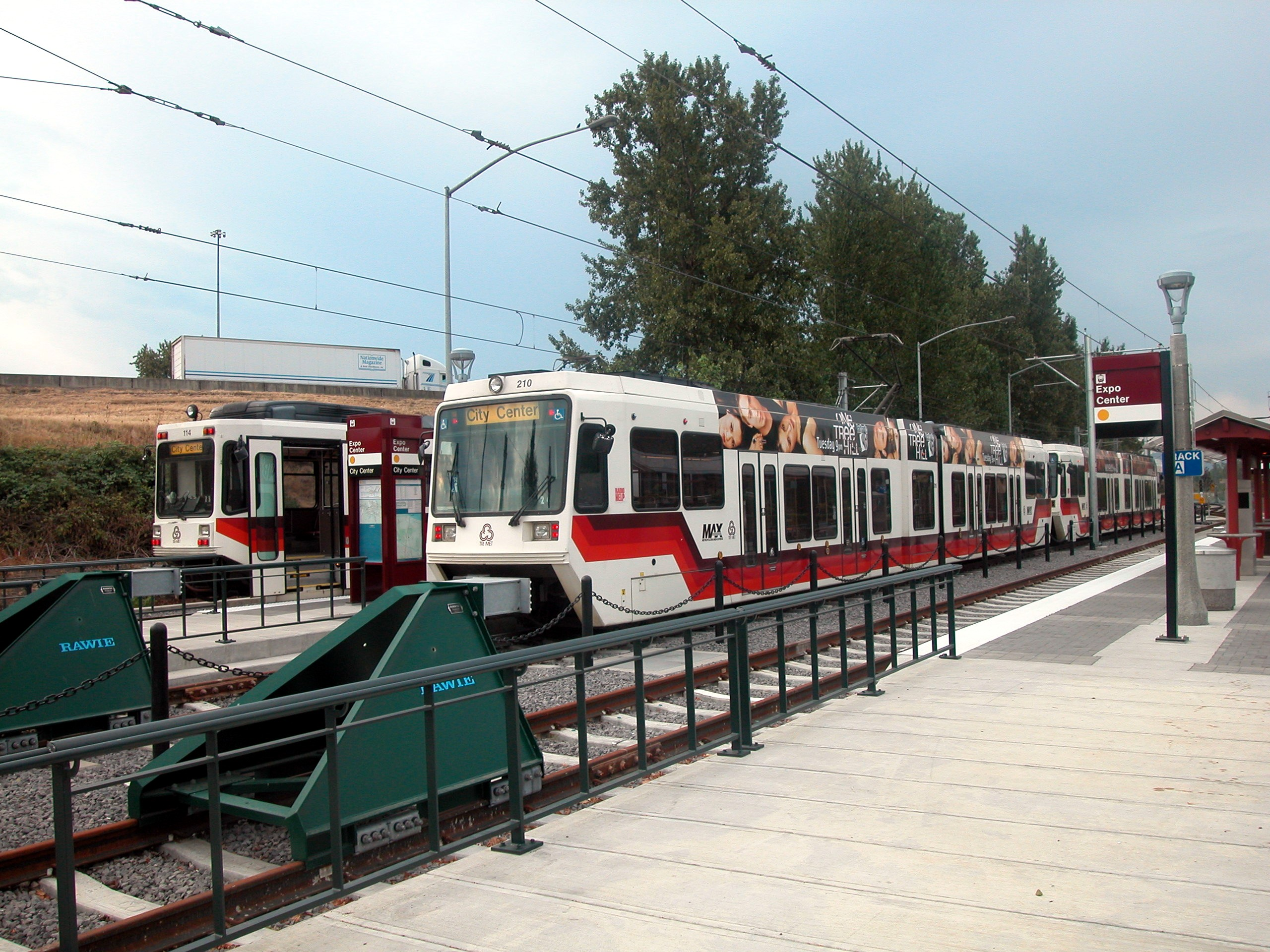
Expo Center station, the Yellow Line's northern terminus

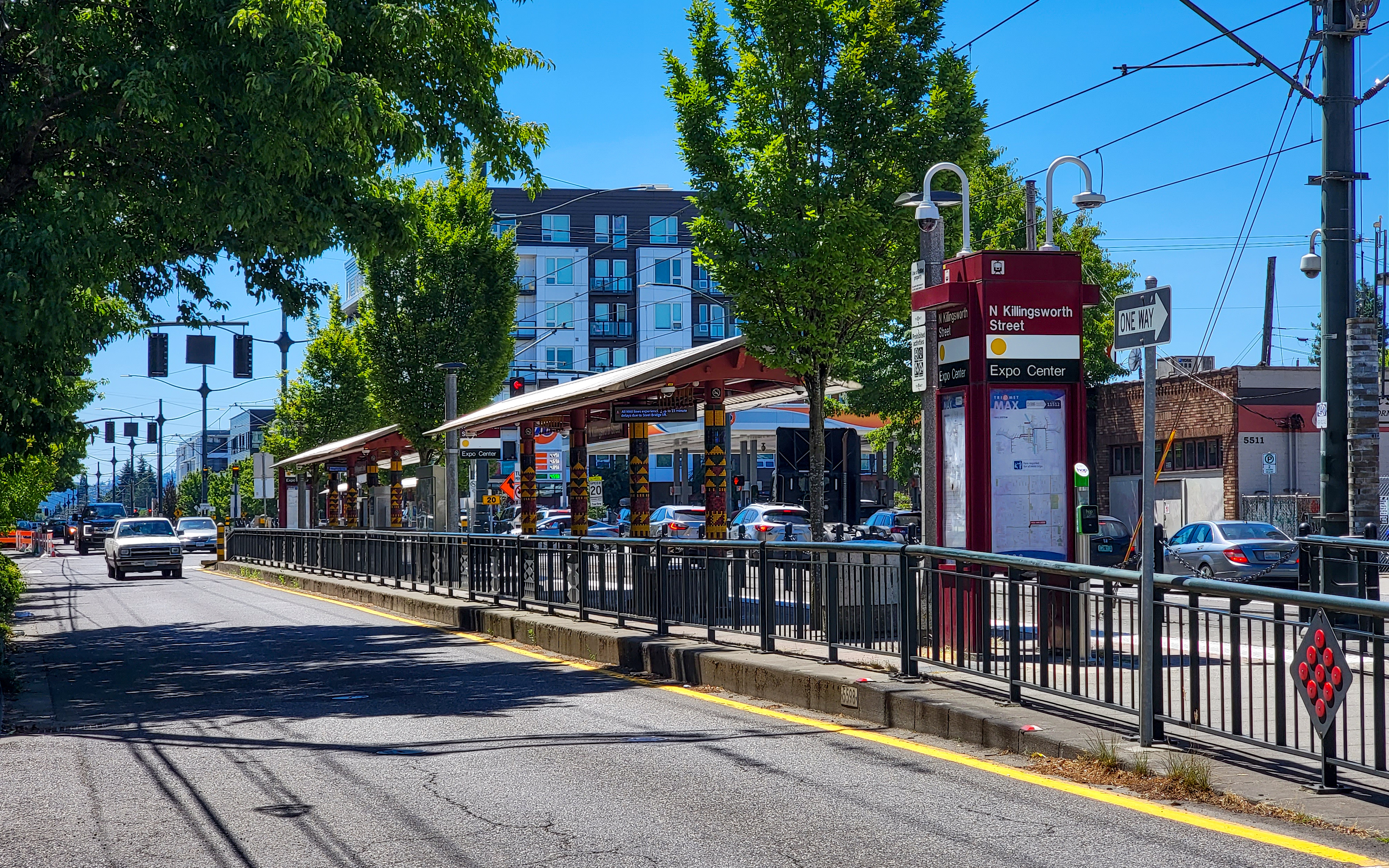
North Killingsworth Street station

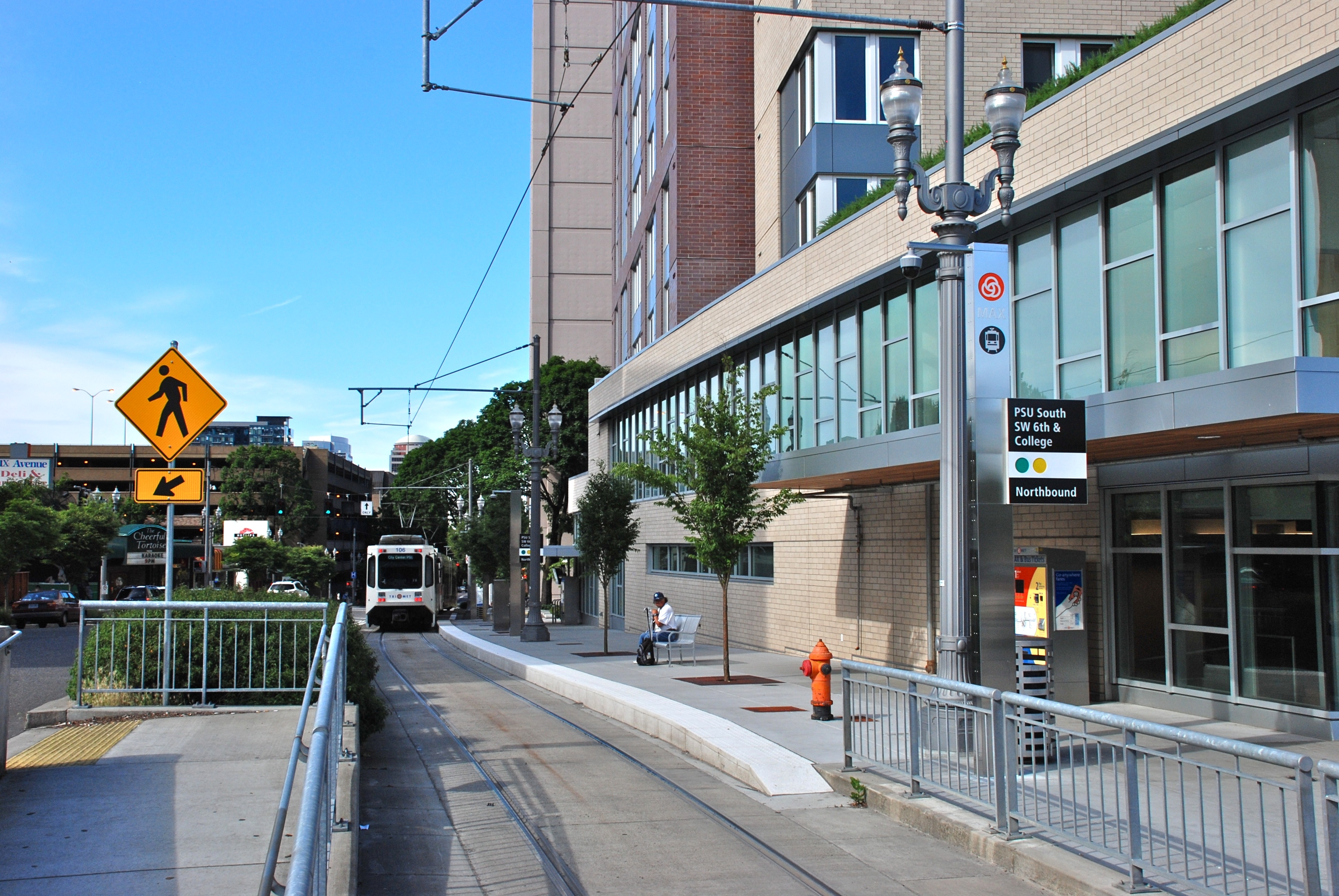
PSU South/Southwest 6th & College station, where most northbound Orange Line trains switch to Yellow Line service

== Service ==
TriMet designates the Yellow Line as a "Frequent Service" route, with trains running every 15 minutes during most of the day, although headways increase to 30 minutes during the early morning and evening hours. Yellow Line trains operate from 4:15 am to 1:00 am the next day on weekdays and 4:15 am to 12:45 am on weekends. End-to-end travel from Expo Center station to the PSU South station takes 35 minutes. At Union Station, Yellow Line trains become Orange Line trains and continue on to Southeast Park Avenue station in Milwaukie. Some evening trains also turn into Blue Line and Green Line trains.

On August 25, 2024, TriMet began operating route 293–Yellow Bus to replace late-night MAX services and to expand the length of time available for routine overnight maintenance of MAX trains. Route 293 generally follows the length of the Yellow Line, from Expo Center station to PSU South station, with one service each way.

=== Ridership ===
The Yellow Line is the fourth-busiest MAX service, averaging 12,960 riders on weekdays in September 2019, down from 13,170 for the same month in 2018. Ridership projections in 2003, several months before the line's opening, expected 13,900 passengers per day during the line's first few years, growing to 20,000 daily passengers by 2020. For the 2015 fiscal year, the Yellow Line recorded 4.9 million total boardings, down from 5.4 million recorded in 2012. The drop in ridership, experienced systemwide, is attributed to crime and to lower-income riders being forced out of the inner city by rising housing prices.

== Impact of urban renewal ==
The presence of the Interstate MAX and its accompanying ICURA plan has been partly blamed for gentrifying historically black Portland neighborhoods. In an analysis conducted by The Oregonian on the 2010 United States census, approximately 10,000 people of color have left Portland's Central City between 2000 and 2010. Of this number, 8,400 had lived in inner North and Northeast Portland neighborhoods. According to another report by the Portland Housing Bureau, neighborhoods around Interstate Avenue and Martin Luther King Jr. Boulevard were the only areas in Portland that experienced double-digit percentage declines in minority population from 2000 to 2013. During the same period, the Interstate Corridor gained more than 13,000 new white and non-Hispanic residents.

The 2000-adopted ICURA plan had outlined policies to prevent the displacement of existing residents—such as ensuring that affordable housing would be top priority—that the Portland Development Commission (PDC) later eliminated. Amid mounting pressure from the community, the PDC began setting aside 30 percent of the urban renewal funds for affordable housing in 2006. The PDC amended the ICURA plan in July 2011, expanding its boundaries to 3,990 acres (1,610 ha) and 17 neighborhoods. In 2016, the city allocated a budget of $52 million to help pay for housing projects within the urban renewal area and devised a housing plan referred to as the "preference policy", which offered a way for affected residents to stay or return to their neighborhoods.
