= Rosa Parks station (TriMet) =

Light rail station in Portland, Oregon, U.S.

Rosa Parks
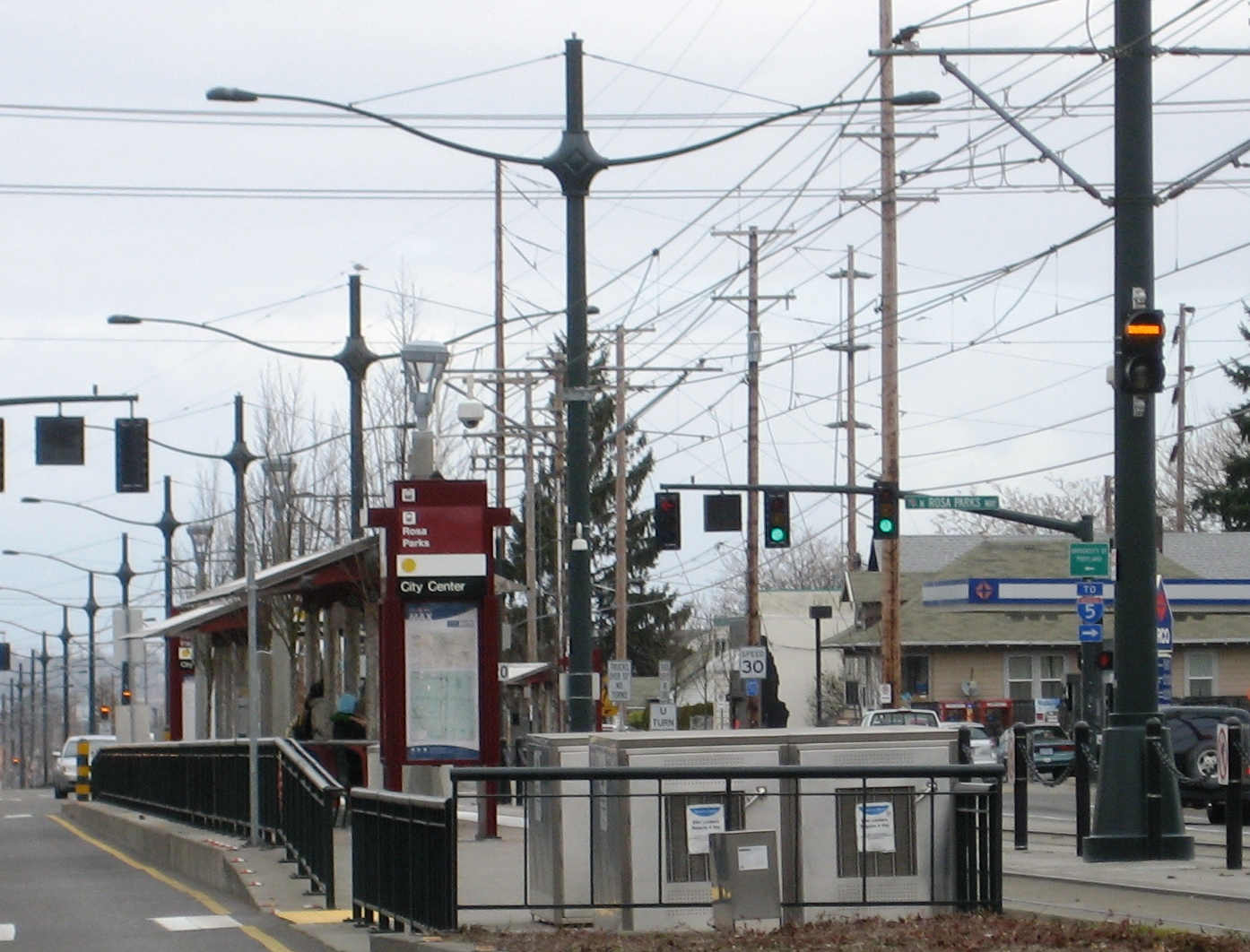
- View from the south

General information
- Location: 6598 (north)/6499 (south) North Interstate Avenue; Portland, Oregon; USA
- Coordinates: 45°34′12″N 122°40′56″W
- Owner: TriMet
- Platforms: split platform
- Tracks: 2

Construction
- Cycle facilities: Bike lockers
- Accessible: yes

History
- Opened: May 1, 2004
- Former names: North Portland Blvd station

Services
Preceding station	TriMet	Following station
North Killingsworth Street toward Union Station/NW 5th & Glisan	Yellow Line	North Lombard Transit Center toward Expo Center
Location

Rosa Parks is a light rail station on the MAX Yellow Line in the Arbor Lodge neighborhood of Portland, Oregon. It is the 6th stop northbound on the Interstate MAX extension. It was originally named North Portland Boulevard, but following the city's decision in fall 2006 to rename Portland Blvd. to Rosa Parks Way, TriMet indicated it would support the change by renaming the station, at a then-undetermined future date. The signs at the station continued to show the old name until Feb. 4, 2009, when a dedication ceremony was held, unveiling new signs renaming it as "Rosa Parks" station ("Way" being implied only). On TriMet's maps and other media, the station is shown as "N Rosa Parks Way".

The station is located in the median of Interstate Avenue near the intersection of N Rosa Parks Way. It has staggered side platforms, which sit on either side of the cross street, because the route runs around this station on Interstate Avenue in the median. Artistic elements at the station refer to Native American art.

== Bus line connections ==
This station is served by the following bus lines:

- 44 - Capitol Hwy/N Rosa Parks
- 293 - Yellow Bus
