= Union Station (TriMet) =

Pair of light rail stations in Portland, Oregon, U.S.

Union Stn NW 6th & HoytUnion Stn NW 5th & Glisan
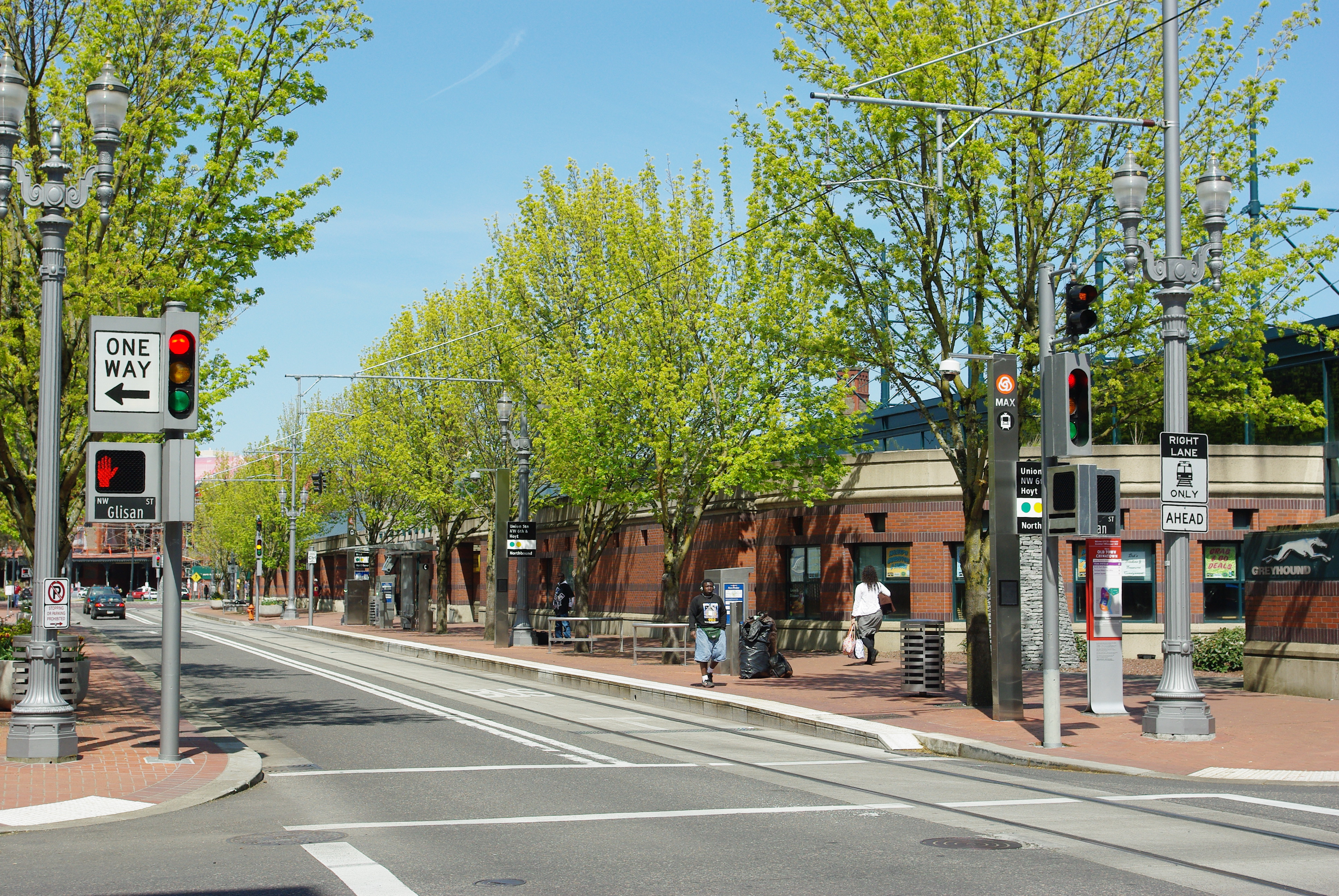
- Northwest 6th & Hoyt platform

General information
- Location: NW 6th & Hoyt (northbound); NW 5th & Glisan (southbound)
- Coordinates: 45°31′37″N 122°40′34″W
- Owner: TriMet
- Tracks: 1 per split
- Bus routes: TriMet: FX2, 291 - Orange Night Bus
- Connections: Amtrak (Union Station) Amtrak Cascades Coast Starlight Empire Builder Trimet; 4, 8, 9, 17, 35, 40, 44, 54, 77

Construction
- Accessible: yes

History
- Opened: August 2009

Services
Preceding station	TriMet	Following station
NW 6th & Hoyt Street
Northwest 6th & Davis One-way operation	Yellow Line	Interstate/Rose Quarter toward Expo Center
NW 5th & Glisan Street
Northwest 5th & Couch toward SE Park Ave	Orange Line	Interstate/Rose Quarter One-way operation
through to Orange Line	Yellow Line	Interstate/Rose Quarter One-way operation
Former services
Preceding station	TriMet	Following station
NW 6th & Hoyt Street
Northwest 6th & Davis One-way operation	Green Line 2009–2026	Rose Quarter Transit Center toward Clackamas Town Center Transit Center
Northwest 6th & Davis One-way operation	Portland Vintage Trolley 2009–2014	Terminus
Northwest 6th & Davis One-way operation	Mall Shuttle 2009–2011	Terminus
NW 5th & Glisan Street
Northwest 5th & Couch toward PSU South/SW 5th & Jackson	Green Line 2009–2026	Rose Quarter Transit Center One-way operation
Northwest 5th & Couch toward PSU South/SW 5th & Jackson	Yellow Line 2009–2015	Interstate/Rose Quarter One-way operation
Northwest 5th & Couch toward PSU South/SW 5th & Jackson	Portland Vintage Trolley 2009–2014	Terminus
Northwest 5th & Couch toward PSU Urban Center/SW 5th & Mill	Mall Shuttle 2009–2011	Terminus
Location

Union Station is a pair of light rail stations on the MAX Orange and Yellow Lines in Portland, Oregon. The northbound station is Union Station/Northwest 6th & Hoyt station and the southbound station is Union Station/Northwest 5th & Glisan station. They are the first stops southbound on the Portland Transit Mall MAX extension. The Union Station/Northwest 6th & Hoyt Street station is served only by the Yellow Line, and the Union Station/Northwest 5th & Glisan Street station is served only by the Orange Line. Originally, from the opening of these stations in 2009 until 2015, the Green and Yellow Lines served both, but in September 2015 the then-new Orange Line replaced the Yellow Line at all southbound stations on the transit mall, and in August 2026 the Green Line was cut back to Gateway Transit Center and no longer serves either station.

The stations are built into the sidewalks of 5th and 6th Avenues and are located next to Union Station, where there are connections to Amtrak and Greyhound buses.

When opened on August 30, 2009, the stations were located in Fareless Square (within fare zone 1), which was renamed the Free Rail Zone four months later, but the fare-free zone was eliminated in 2012 when TriMet discontinued all use of fare zones.
