= Portland Transit Mall =

Public transit corridor in Portland, US

Coordinates: 45.519°N 122.679°W

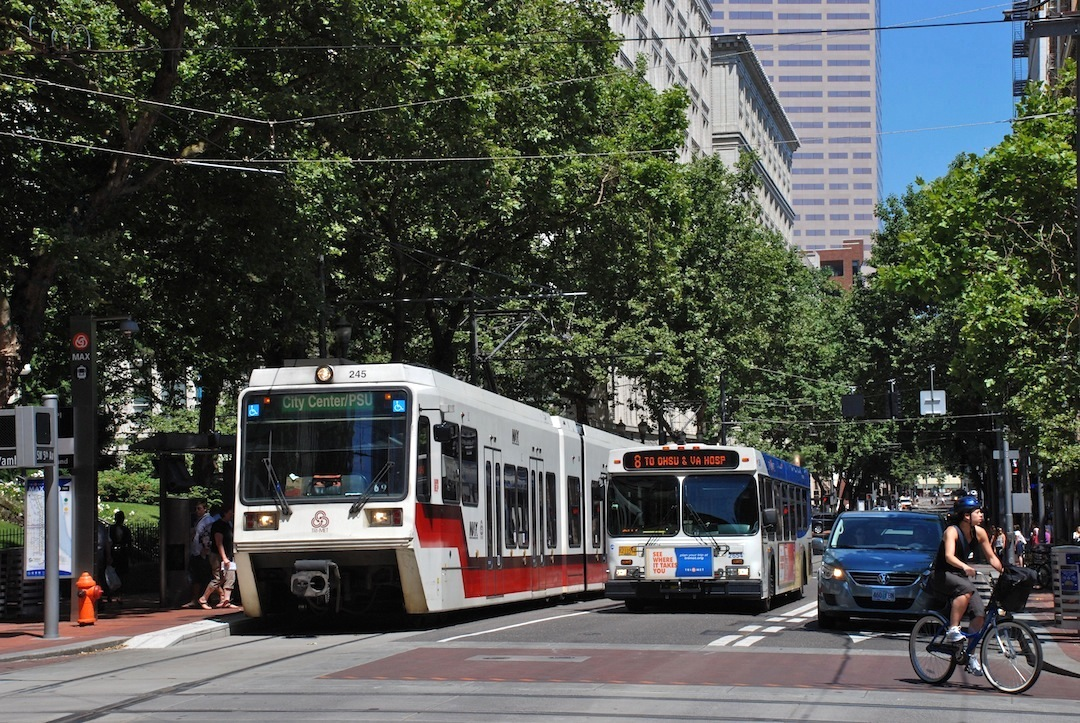
- Since mid-2009, MAX Light Rail and buses have shared the Portland Transit Mall

Overview
- Status: Operational
- Locale: Portland, Oregon, U.S.
- Termini: NW Irving Street (north); SW Jackson Street (south)
- Stations: 33 bus stops 14 light rail platforms

Service
- Type: Light rail, transit bus
- Services: C-Tran; Frequent Express; MAX Light Rail; TriMet (local bus)

History
- Opened: December 11, 1977

The Portland Transit Mall is a 1.2-mile (1.9 km) public transit corridor that travels north–south through the center of downtown in Portland, Oregon, United States. It comprises a pair of one-way streets—6th Avenue for northbound traffic and 5th Avenue for southbound—along which two of three lanes are restricted to transit buses and light rail vehicles only. As of August 2026, the corridor is served by the Orange and Yellow lines of MAX Light Rail; Frequent Express; and over a dozen local bus routes, all of which are services of TriMet, the transit agency operating within the Oregon side of the Portland metropolitan area. C-Tran, the transit agency for Clark County, Washington, additionally serves it with two express bus routes—#105 I-5 Express and #164 Fisher’s Landing Express. From 2009 to 2026, the MAX Green Line also served the transit mall.

The transit mall was conceived as part of Portland's 1972 Downtown Plan. It opened in 1977 and until light rail trains were added in 2009, buses were the only transit vehicles using it. The mall was rebuilt and extended southwards from 2007 to 2009, and it reopened for buses on May 24, 2009. Light rail service on the mall was introduced on August 30, 2009, with the shifting of the MAX Yellow Line to the mall from its original routing in downtown, and a second MAX line, the Green Line, began serving the mall two weeks later, on September 12. Between fall 2009 and July 2014, the Portland Vintage Trolley also served the transit mall on certain Sundays. In September 2015, the new MAX Orange Line replaced the Yellow Line service in the southbound direction on the mall, on 5th Avenue, with the Orange and Yellow lines being through-routed at all times. In August 2026, the Green Line was cut back to Gateway Transit Center and no longer serves the transit mall.

== History ==
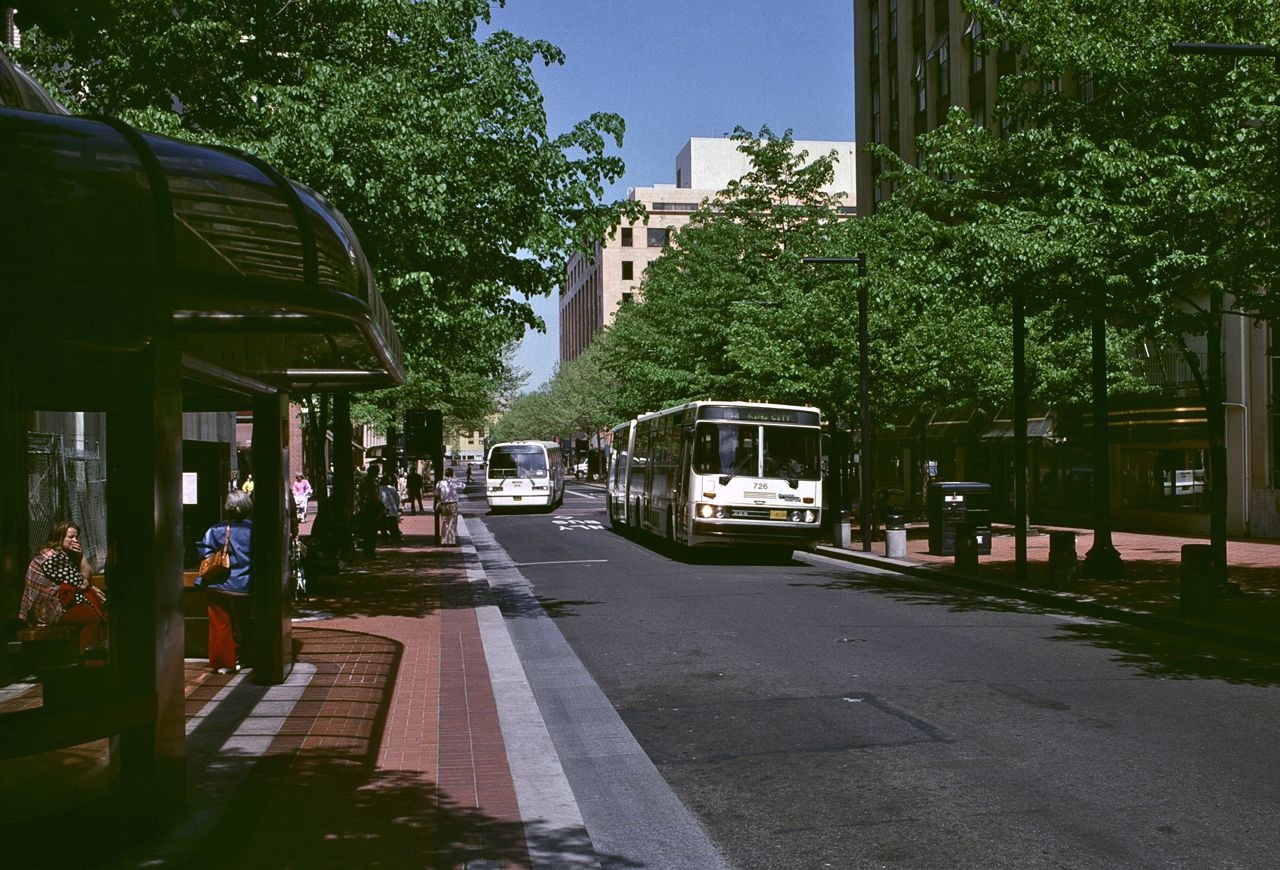
The original design of the Mall, from 1977 to 2007

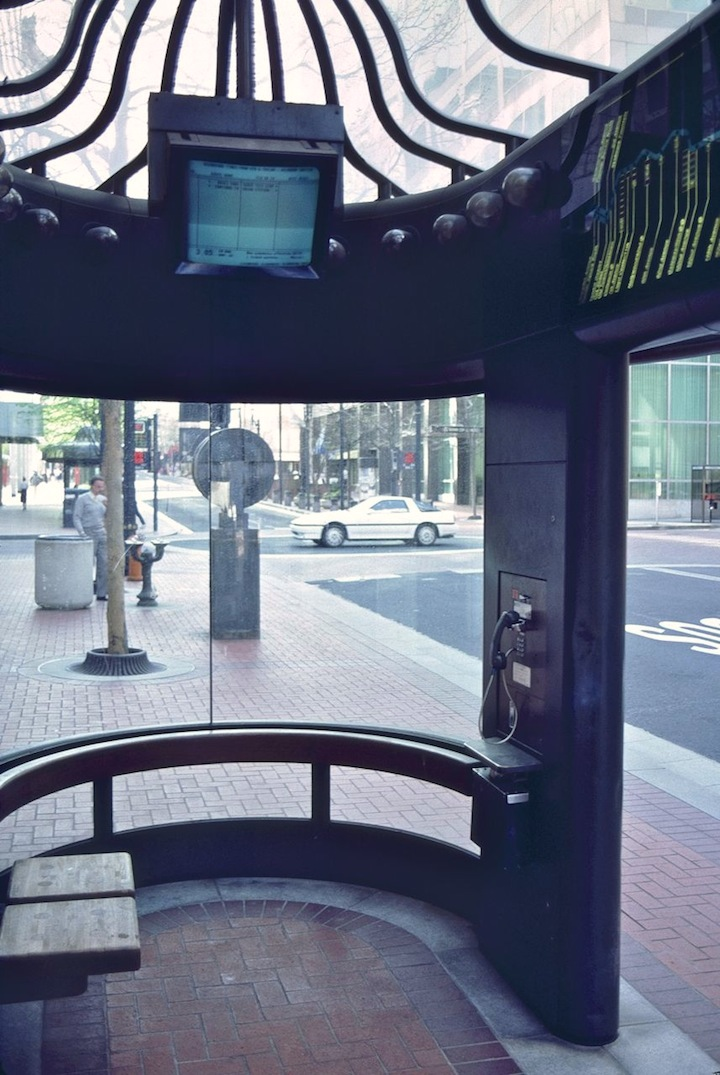
Interior of Portland Mall shelter in 1987, with a pay phone

The Portland Transit Mall (formally named simply the Portland Mall) was constructed by TriMet, the Portland metropolitan area's regional transit agency, in 1976–77 and opened on December 11, 1977. It was formally dedicated in March 1978. The mall comprises 5th Avenue, for southbound buses, and 6th Avenue, for northbound buses, and when first opened it involved the sections of those streets extending from West Burnside Street to SW Madison Street: the central core of downtown.

In June 1994, the mall was extended northward through Chinatown to Union Station (used by Amtrak) and the Greyhound bus depot. Short, unconnected additions were made in the area around Portland State University in the early 2000s.

TriMet's Fareless Square (renamed the "Free Rail Zone" in 2010) encompassed the entire mall until discontinued in 2012, and these two facilities/measures, among others, have contributed to TriMet's having become one of the nation's most successful and most-studied public transportation systems.

Prior to its closure for rebuilding in 2007, the Portland Mall's design permitted private vehicle traffic to use the left lane, but only in short, two-block segments. In every third block, the lefthand (auto) lane disappeared for one block, and the otherwise three-lane-wide street became two lanes wide and restricted to buses only. In this way, two-thirds of the specific blocks along 5th Avenue and 6th Avenue remained open to cars, but use of those streets for through travel by cars was prohibited.

== Design and amenities ==
The 1970s rebuilding of 5th and 6th avenues as transit-priority streets included several changes designed to create an environment that was more attractive and inviting to transit users and other pedestrians. Sidewalks were widened and repaved in brick, many additional trees were planted, new works of public art were commissioned and installed, and amenities such as benches and flower planters were added.

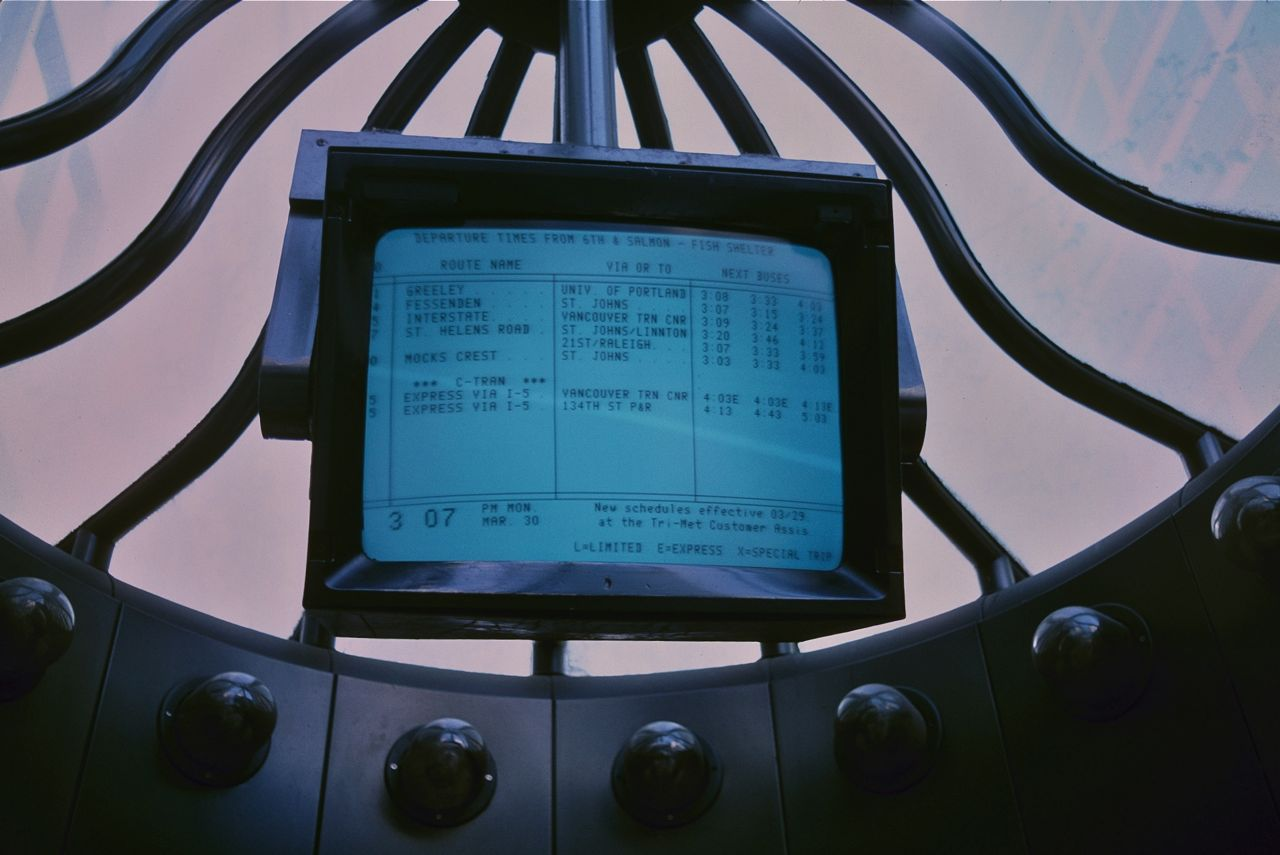
The CCTV schedule-information monitors in each shelter, black-and-white until 1988, were considered groundbreaking in urban transit use when the mall opened.

At each bus stop, a large new passenger shelter was installed. In addition to a pay telephone, every shelter was equipped with a closed-circuit television monitor giving riders information as to the next three departures on each bus route serving that particular stop. This particular feature of the Portland Transit Mall was said to be a "first" for urban transit at the time (1977), having previously been used only in intercity transportation terminals, mainly airports. The information system came into use in January 1978. The monitors were originally black-and-white, but were replaced by color ones in 1988.

Most bus routes serving downtown Portland followed the transit mall, but a few remained on so-called "cross-mall" routings, along east-west streets, originally Morrison and Yamhill streets but shifted to Washington and Salmon streets with the start of MAX construction in the early 1980s.

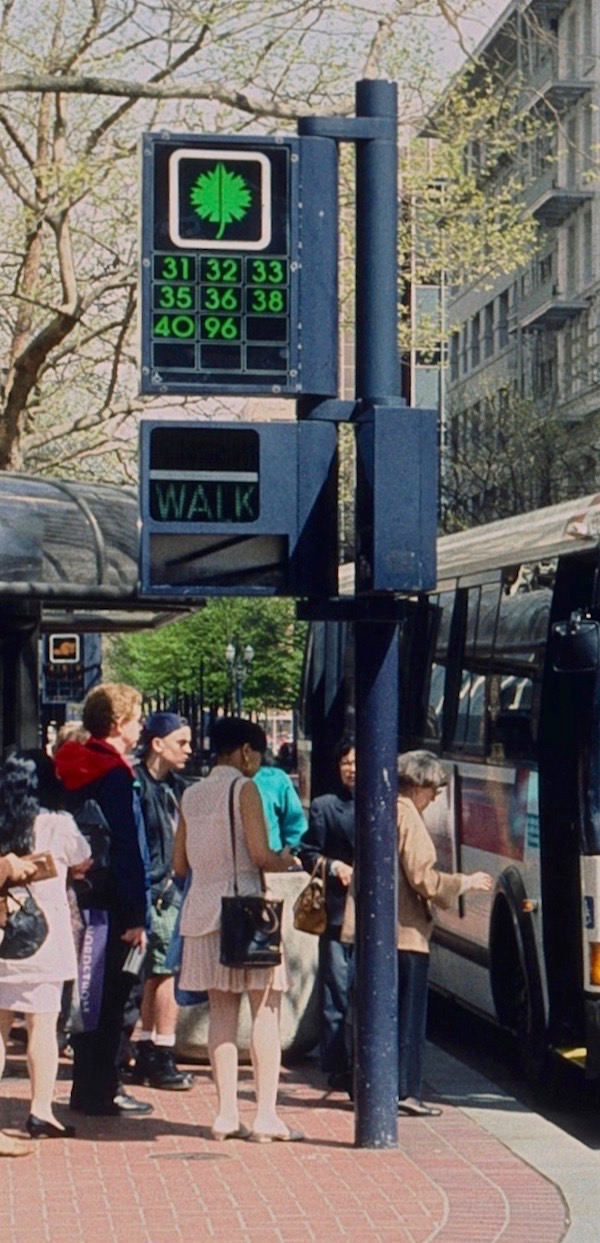
Passengers boarding in 1993 at a stop marked by one of the eight "sector symbols"

With regard to operations, the mall was designed with two bus stops in each block, or about one stop every 100 feet (30 m). However, a bus operating on any given route only stopped at every fourth stop, i.e., every two blocks. TriMet adopted symbols and colors for each grouping of stops, so that bus riders could easily determine which particular stop locations were served by their routes. The colors/symbols, which were marked by large signs at each stop and also shown on public schedules and maps, were as follows: Brown Beaver, Green Leaf, Yellow Rose, Orange Deer, Red Fish, Purple Raindrops and Blue Snowflake. They were also called "sector symbols", as each one corresponded to a particular sector of the city, e.g., the Rose being for routes serving Southwest Portland and the Fish for North Portland routes. When TriMet's first light rail line opened in 1986, use of the Snowflake symbol on the mall was discontinued, as all TriMet routes in that sector were curtailed to terminate at a light rail station, such as the Gateway Transit Center, and no longer traveled to downtown.

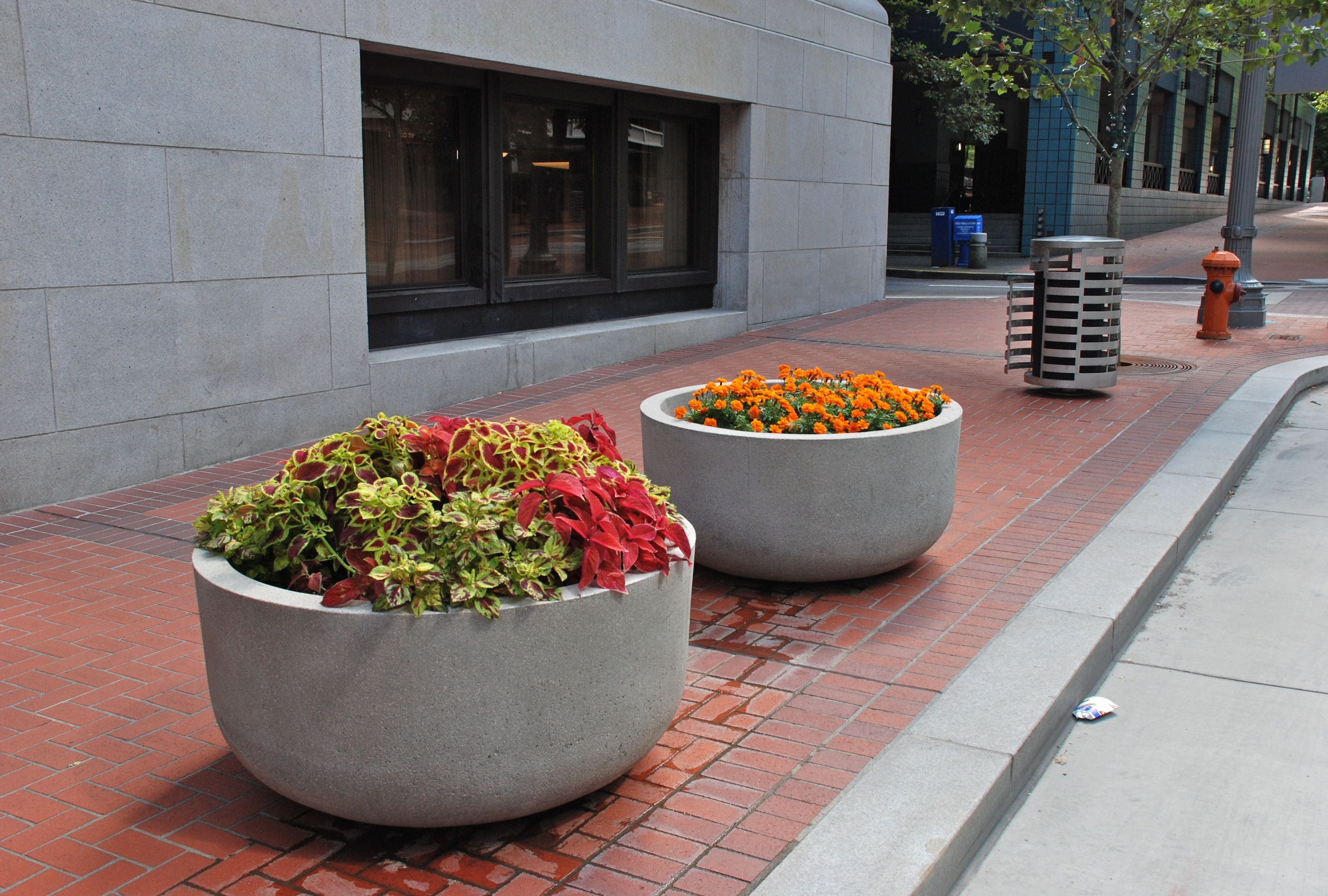
Flower planters on the mall

This operating configuration for the Portland Mall remained largely unchanged for 29 years, before the mall closed for rebuilding in early 2007. TriMet discontinued use of the distinctive graphic symbols used at mall stops at that time, but the symbols had already been relegated to secondary status in 2002, when they were replaced by purely geographic, letter designations such as N or NE (for North Portland or Northeast Portland) for each grouping. The graphic sector symbols were retained only at a greatly reduced size on the mall signs (much smaller in size than the new letter indications) and were no longer used at all in other TriMet media, such as the covers of bus schedules. They disappeared entirely in January 2007.

== Renovation and rebuilding ==
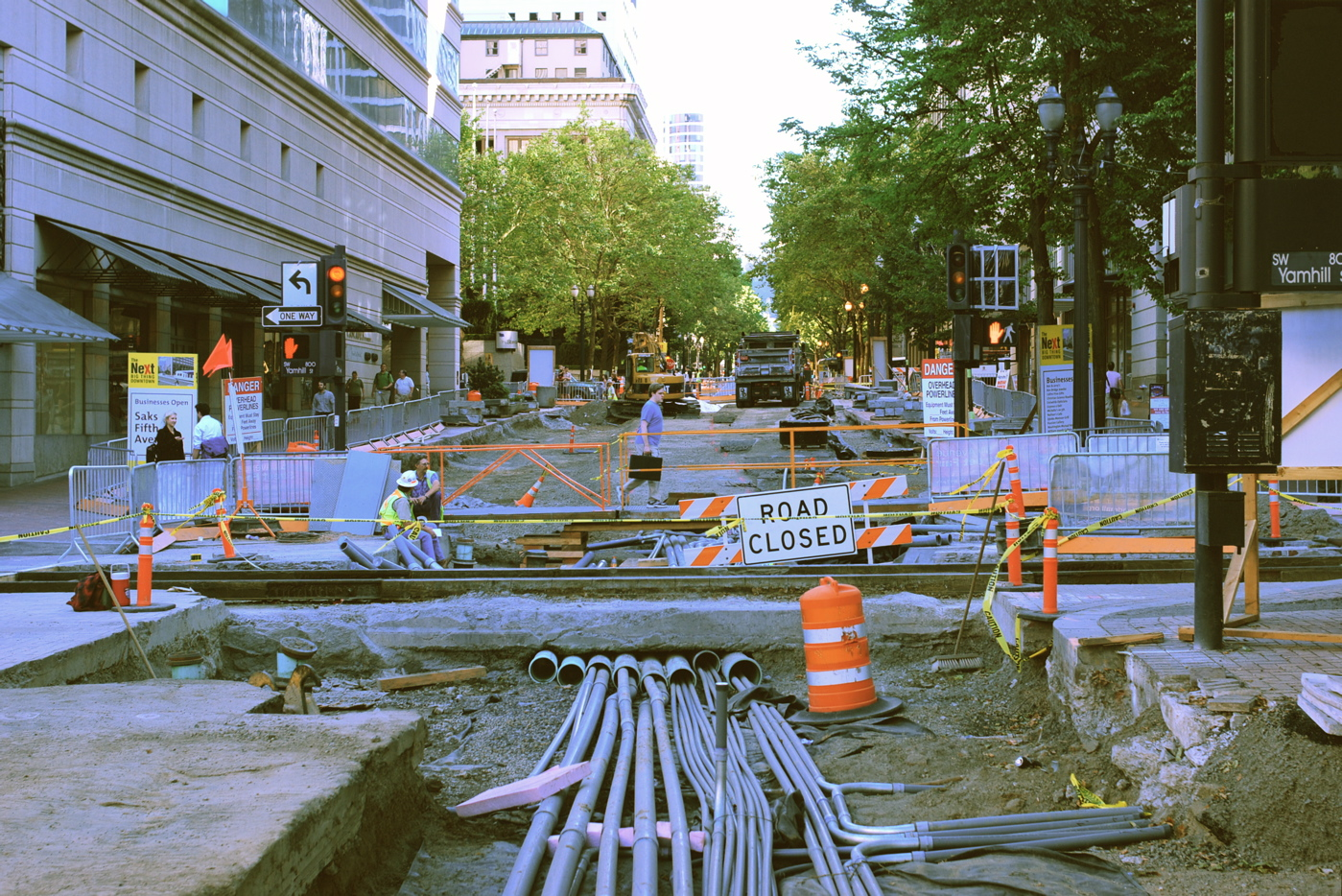
A July 2007 photo, during the mall's 2007–09 rebuilding

In 2004, it was decided to add MAX light rail to the transit mall, as TriMet's existing MAX routing through downtown was nearing its design capacity and another line (the Green Line) was being planned and was expected to be added to the system within a few years. Also, the mall was approaching three decades of use, and was in need of a heavy renovation. TriMet and transportation planners from the city and Metro studied how best to accommodate both buses and light rail on the mall. During this process, it was also decided, at the urging of the downtown business community, to reconfigure the mall's traffic lanes in such a way as to permit autos and other private traffic to use the left lane for the entire lengths of 5th and 6th avenues, a controversial decision. The project would also extend the mall south, from Madison Street all the way to the southern end of downtown and of Fareless Square, at the Stadium Freeway (I-405), thereby reaching Portland State University.

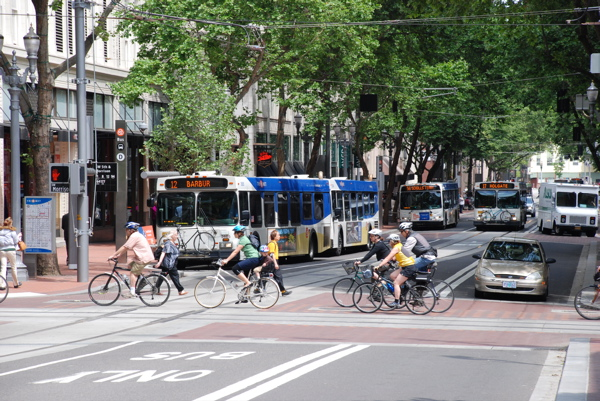
The mall's southbound street, 5th Avenue, at Morrison Street in June 2009. The roof of the shelter at this bus stop had not yet been installed.

The Portland Transit Mall temporarily closed for rebuilding on January 14, 2007. The work carried out over the next two years included the addition of light rail tracks and widening, to three lanes, all of the few south-of-Burnside sections which had previously been intentionally narrowed (by the original 1970s design) to two lanes and bus-only. During the lengthy closure, all bus routes using the mall were diverted to other streets, many to the nearby pair of 3rd Avenue (southbound) and 4th Avenue (northbound), where they had to share all traffic lanes with private vehicles but with parking temporarily removed at all of the new bus stops. Some routes were cut back to the southern part of downtown, making a loop along Columbia and Jefferson Streets.

In 2007, local officials and businessmen expressed confidence that the renovation and extension of the transit mall would foster major new property redevelopment in downtown over the next several years.

Bus service returned to the mall on May 24, 2009. Three months later, on August 30, 2009, MAX light rail began serving the mall, when the Yellow Line was shifted from its original (2004) downtown routing. On September 12, 2009, the new Green Line opened, and it served the transit mall as well (for 17 years).

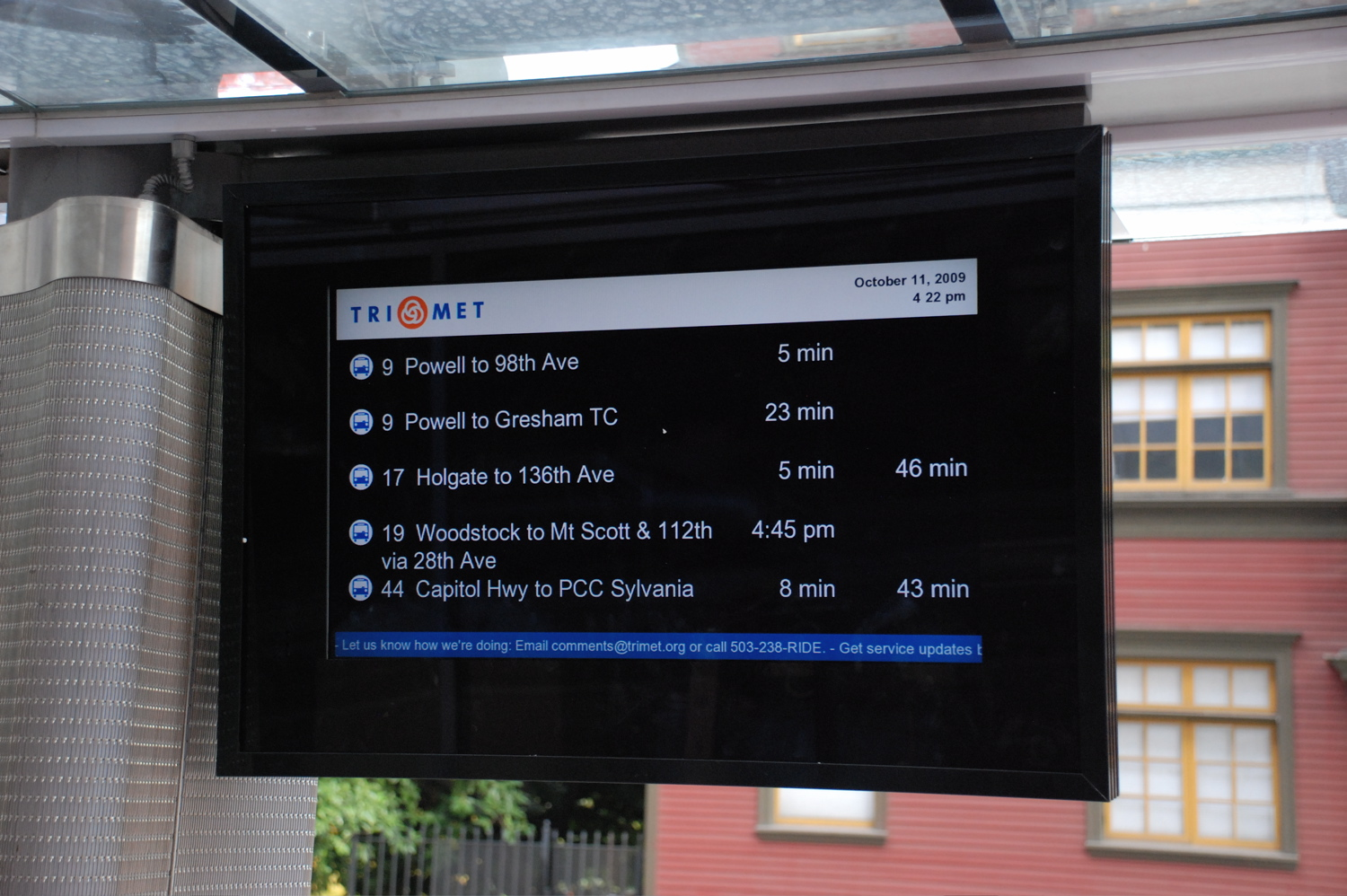
Digital sign mounted in a shelter on the mall, giving real-time schedule information

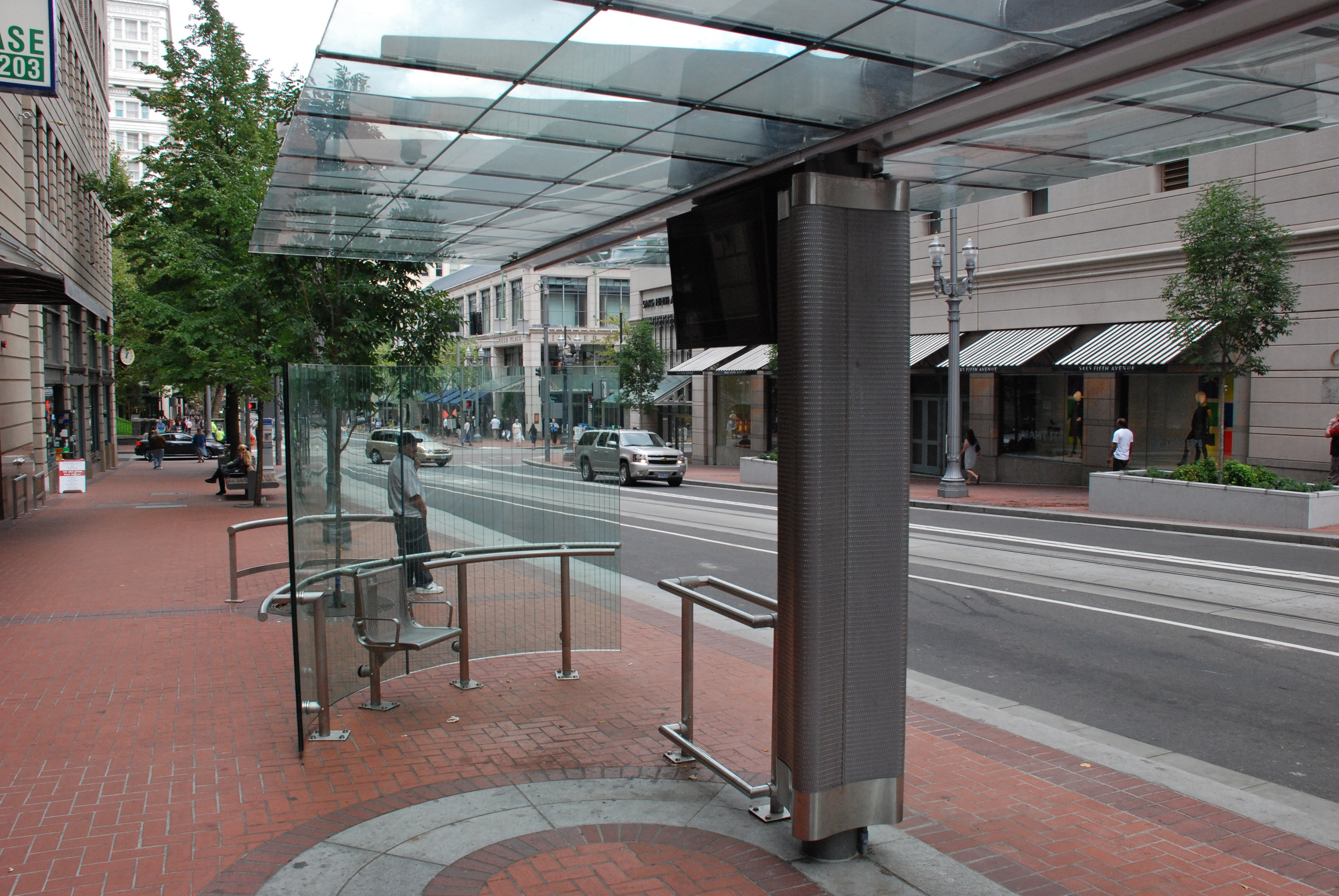
New shelter design introduced in 2009

In the new design, MAX stops are located every 4–5 blocks, and a bus (on a given route) also stops only every 4–5 blocks. Groupings of stops are marked by letters: A, B, C or D on 5th Avenue, and W, X, Y or Z on 6th Avenue. All of the few routes that were shortened slightly, to terminate in the southern part of downtown upon the mall's closure for rebuilding in 2007, have been permanently revised so as to no longer serve the mall, where replacement service is now being provided by light rail. The mall is currently served by 17 TriMet bus routes, six of which only operate in peak hours (at least on that part of their route). Only one 1977 shelter survived demolition; located near Southwest 5th and Salmon streets, it was spared as a reminder of the previous transit mall, later re-purposed as a concession stand.

Although cars and trucks are now allowed to use the left lane for the entire length of the transit mall, they are—with the exception of a very few locations—not permitted to turn right at any intersections. A motorist wanting to turn right from the transit mall must turn left, and make two additional left turns, to end up in the desired direction. This prevents cars' making right turns into the path of an oncoming bus or light rail car, which might be unable safely to stop in time to prevent a serious collision.

== Vintage Trolley service ==
On September 13, 2009, the Sundays-only Portland Vintage Trolley service moved to the transit mall from a different route it had followed since 1991. The trolley cars served the full length of the mall, from Union Station to Portland State University. However, the Vintage Trolley service was discontinued in 2014, running for the last time on July 6 of that year.

== MAX Mall Shuttle ==
MAX Mall Shuttle

Overview
- Locale: Portland, Oregon
- Termini: Portland State University (PSU); Union Station
- Stations: 12

Service
- Type: Light rail
- System: MAX Light Rail
- Operator: TriMet

History
- Opened: September 14, 2009
- Closed: June 3, 2011

Technical
- Line length: 1.5 miles (2.4 km)
- Track gauge: 1,435 mm (4 ft 8 1/2 in) (standard gauge)

The MAX Mall Shuttle was a service that operated from 2009 until 2011, weekday afternoons only. Introduced on September 14, 2009, it supplemented the light-rail service provided on the mall by the Yellow and Green lines and operated only between Union Station and PSU, about every 30 minutes on weekdays from noon until 5:30 p.m. TriMet discontinued this supplementary shuttle service effective June 5, 2011 (making Friday, June 3 the final day of operation). Along with bus service, the mall continued to be served for the next 15 years by two MAX lines in each direction – Green and Yellow northbound and Green and Orange southbound – which provided a combined average headway of 7.5 minutes in each direction at most times. However, since August 23, 2026, the Orange and Yellow Lines are the only MAX lines serving the mall, on a 15-minute headway.

== See also ==
- Fareless Square
- List of TriMet transit centers
- MAX Light Rail
- Portland Streetcar
- Transportation in Portland, Oregon
