= SE Bybee Blvd station =

MAX Orange Line station in Portland, Oregon, U.S.

SE Bybee Blvd
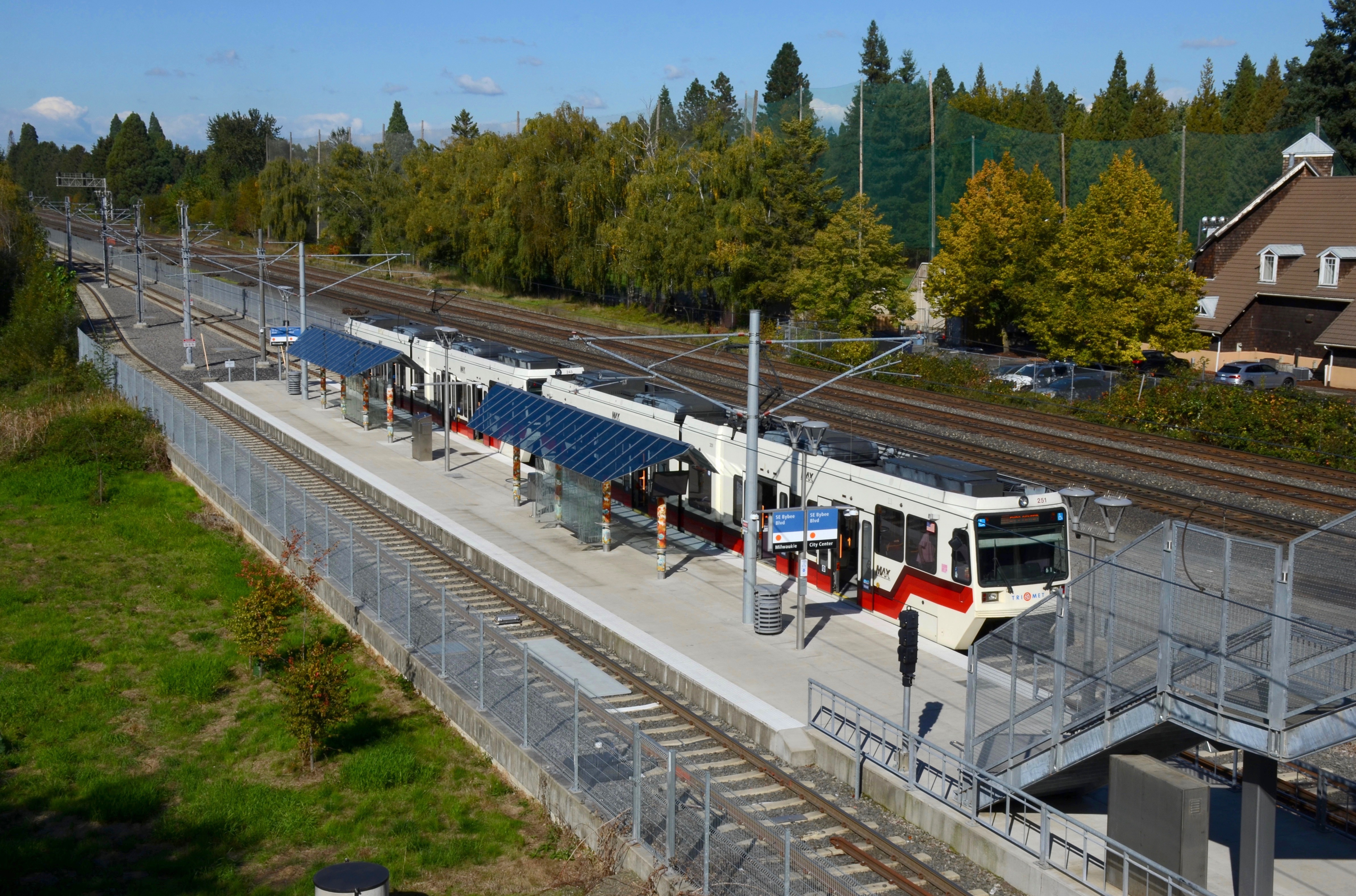
- The station platform viewed from the Bybee Bridge, 2019

General information
- Location: 2425 SE Bybee Blvd; Portland, Oregon, U.S.
- Coordinates: 45°28′28″N 122°38′24″W
- Owner: TriMet
- Platforms: 1 island platform
- Tracks: 2
- Connections: TriMet: 4

Construction
- Cycle facilities: 46 parking racks
- Accessible: Yes

History
- Opened: September 12, 2015

Passengers
- Fall 2024: 240 weekday boardings

Services
Preceding station	TriMet	Following station
SE Tacoma/Johnson Creek toward SE Park Ave	Orange Line	SE 17th Ave & Holgate Blvd toward PSU South/SW 6th & College
Location

SE Bybee Blvd station is a light rail station in Portland, Oregon, United States, served by TriMet's MAX Light Rail system. It is the fourth northbound station on the Orange Line, which runs between Portland City Center, Southeast Portland, Milwaukie, and Oak Grove. The station is situated between Union Pacific (UP) railroad tracks to the east and Southeast McLoughlin Boulevard (Oregon Route 99E) to the west. Its island platform is accessed from the Bybee Bridge, which spans the platform and links Portland's Sellwood-Moreland and Eastmoreland neighborhoods.

SE Bybee Blvd station was built as part of the Portland–Milwaukie Light Rail Project, which extended MAX service from downtown Portland to Milwaukie in Clackamas County. Construction began in July 2013, and the station opened with the rest of the extension on September 12, 2015. Nearby destinations include Westmoreland Park, Eastmoreland Golf Course, Crystal Springs Rhododendron Garden, and Reed College. The station is served by TriMet bus route 4–Fessenden/Woodstock.

== History ==
SE Bybee Blvd station serves Southeast Bybee Boulevard via a connection from the station platform to the Bybee Bridge. The first Bybee Bridge was built in 1911 by the Ladd Estate Company. It provided the only direct link between Sellwood-Moreland in the west and Eastmoreland in the east via a grade-separated crossing over the Southern Pacific (SP) railroad tracks. The tracks were constructed in 1869 by the Oregon Central Railroad and acquired by UP in 1996. The bridge was improved in 1934 and 1943 and replaced by the City of Portland in 2004.

=== Early light rail plans ===
In 1975, regional planners proposed a light rail line for the McLoughlin Boulevard (OR 99E) corridor, which runs west of and parallel to the SP railroad tracks, against the backdrop of freeway revolts that defeated the Mount Hood Freeway project. The line was envisioned to run from downtown Portland south to Oregon City in Clackamas County as part of a network of "transitways" between Portland and its suburbs. In 1982, the regional government, Metro, adopted a regional transportation plan placing a transitway between Portland and Clackamas County as third priority, behind the Banfield and Westside projects, which would build the first two segments of MAX Light Rail. Between 1984 and 1993, Metro continued planning for the Clackamas County line and evaluated the feasibility of additional corridors, including Interstate 5 (I-5) and I-205. The so-called "South/North Corridor" was finalized in April 1993 with the selection of "Milwaukie", which subsumes McLoughlin Boulevard, and "I-5 North" as the south and north priority corridors, respectively.

Outreach for the South/North Corridor Project began in the mid-1990s, and a station just north of the Bybee Bridge was identified in the 1998 Draft Environmental Impact Statement (EIS). The Bybee station was the only station proposed for the segment between Southeast 20th Avenue and Tacoma Street, referred to as the "McLoughlin Boulevard Segment", and a design consideration was whether to build a separate pedestrian bridge or rebuild the existing one for station access. The South/North Corridor Project was ultimately canceled after it failed to secure local funding over several attempts, the last of which was a regionwide ballot measure that voters rejected on November 3, 1998.

=== Portland–Milwaukie MAX extension ===
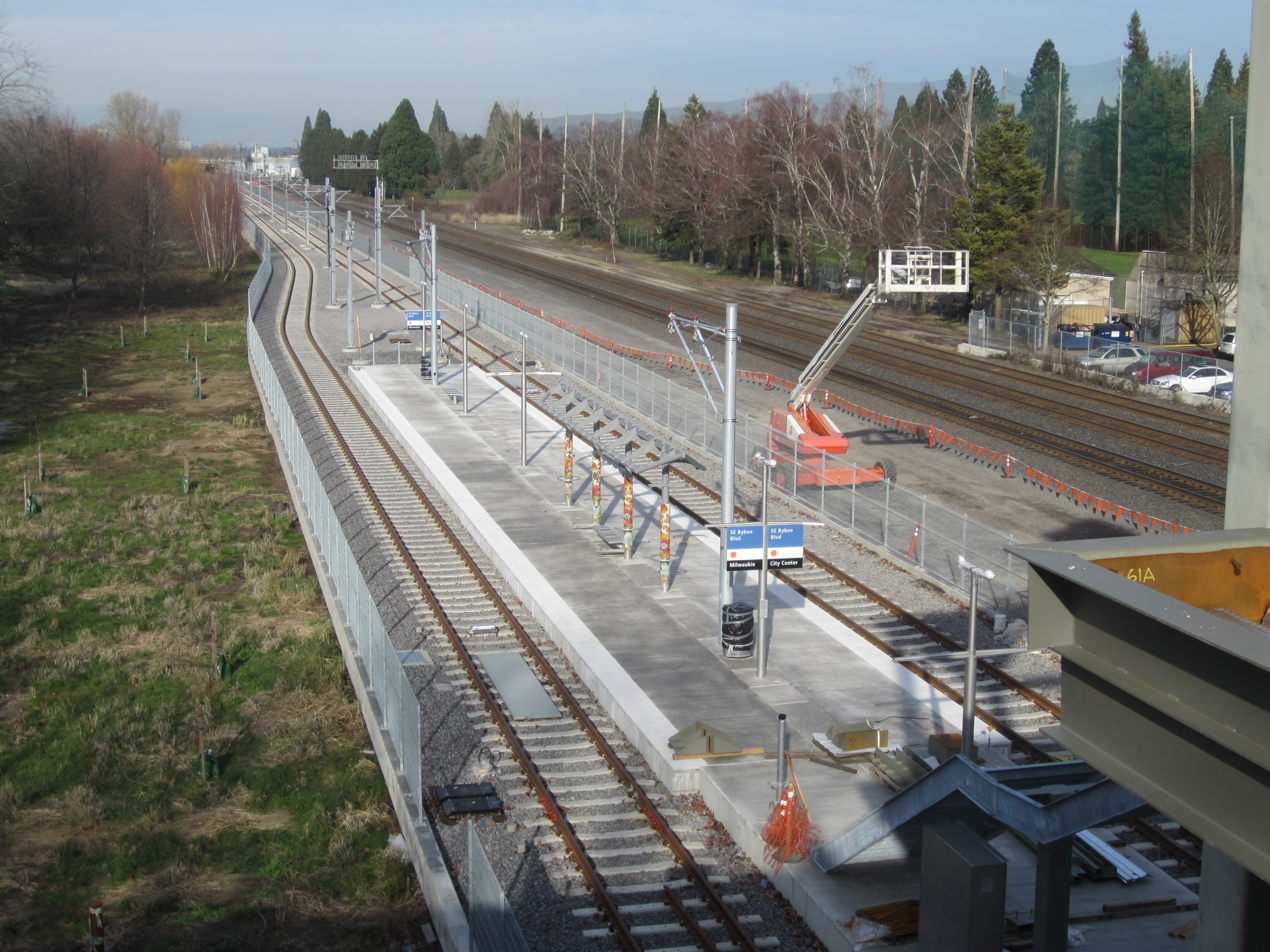
The station platform under construction in 2015

In response to the 1998 funding measure's defeat, Metro's Joint Policy Advisory Committee on Transportation (JPACT) commissioned the South Corridor Transportation Alternatives Study to reevaluate the modes and alternatives proposed for the Milwaukie and I-205 corridors. After considering the study's findings and public comments, a supplemental draft EIS was prepared with the Federal Transit Administration and the Federal Highway Administration. In April 2003, Metro adopted a locally preferred alternative (LPA) for the South Corridor that outlined a two-phased approach, with phase one extending light rail along I-205 and phase two from downtown Portland to Milwaukie.

The 2003 LPA included a Bybee station in the same location as the 1998 South/North draft EIS, but the phase two project was considered to have outstanding alignment issues and was thus not considered final. In 2008, Metro adopted a separate LPA for the Portland–Milwaukie Light Rail Project that officially retained the stop. Outreach for the station resumed in early 2009 during the Portland–Milwaukie project's preliminary engineering phase. TriMet, the regional transit agency, subsequently engaged with nearby neighborhood associations to discuss specific design elements and address safety and accessibility concerns. In 2012, TriMet approached engineering firm CH2M Hill for further design recommendations, which led to a second bus pull-out and elevator on the south side of the bridge.

Construction of SE Bybee Blvd station commenced in early 2013. By the end of January 2014, the station was about 60 percent complete. In March 2015, The Oregonian published an article covering TriMet's plans to install and test turnstiles at the station, one of two locations on the Portland–Milwaukie extension along with SE Park Ave. Testing was scheduled to begin in 2016, but the project never materialized. In May 2015, the first public train ride carrying 500 passengers, including Governor Kate Brown and Senator Jeff Merkley, ran the entire length of the 7.3-mile (11.7 km) Portland–Milwaukie project route. By then, the service was called the "Orange Line". SE Bybee Blvd station opened during the inaugural service of the Orange Line on September 12, 2015.

== Station details ==
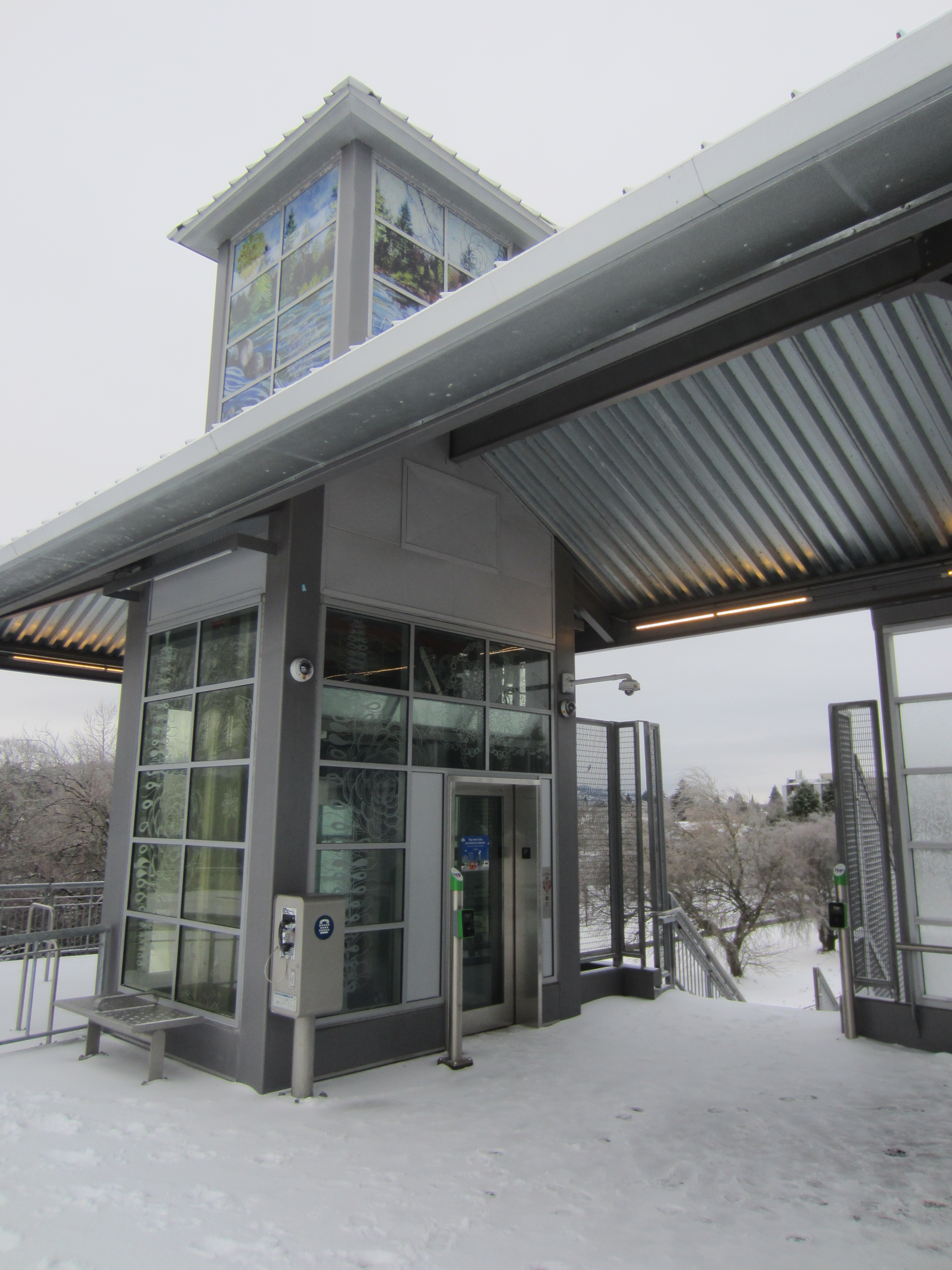
The elevator on the north entrance, seen with snow in 2021

SE Bybee Blvd station occupies a section of dedicated light rail right-of-way between McLoughlin Boulevard (OR 99E) to the west and UP railroad tracks to the east. The surrounding transportation corridors are not traversable by pedestrians; the only route available is the Bybee Bridge, which provides a grade-separated, perpendicular crossing over the state highway and railroad tracks to connect Sellwood-Moreland and Eastmoreland, neighborhoods that would otherwise be separated by the transportation corridors. The station's immediate surroundings include Westmoreland Park, Eastmoreland Golf Course, and Crystal Springs Rhododendron Garden.

SE Bybee Blvd station features an island platform situated directly beneath the Bybee Bridge, accessed from entrances at the crest of the bridge on both the north and south sides. Each entrance is equipped with stairs and an elevator and includes a bus pullout.

=== Public art ===
Public art at the station includes Crystallization by Dana Lynn Louis, which features screen printed and painted glass, glass etchings, and light projections. The cupola has illuminated images of Crystal Springs and there are nature-inspired drawings etched into the glass and elevator. Two light projections create colorful patterns on the elevator towers at night. The platform shelter columns feature the glass mosaic Journey Through Time by Lynn Basa, which has a floral design inspired by the Crystal Springs Rhododendron Garden.

== Services ==
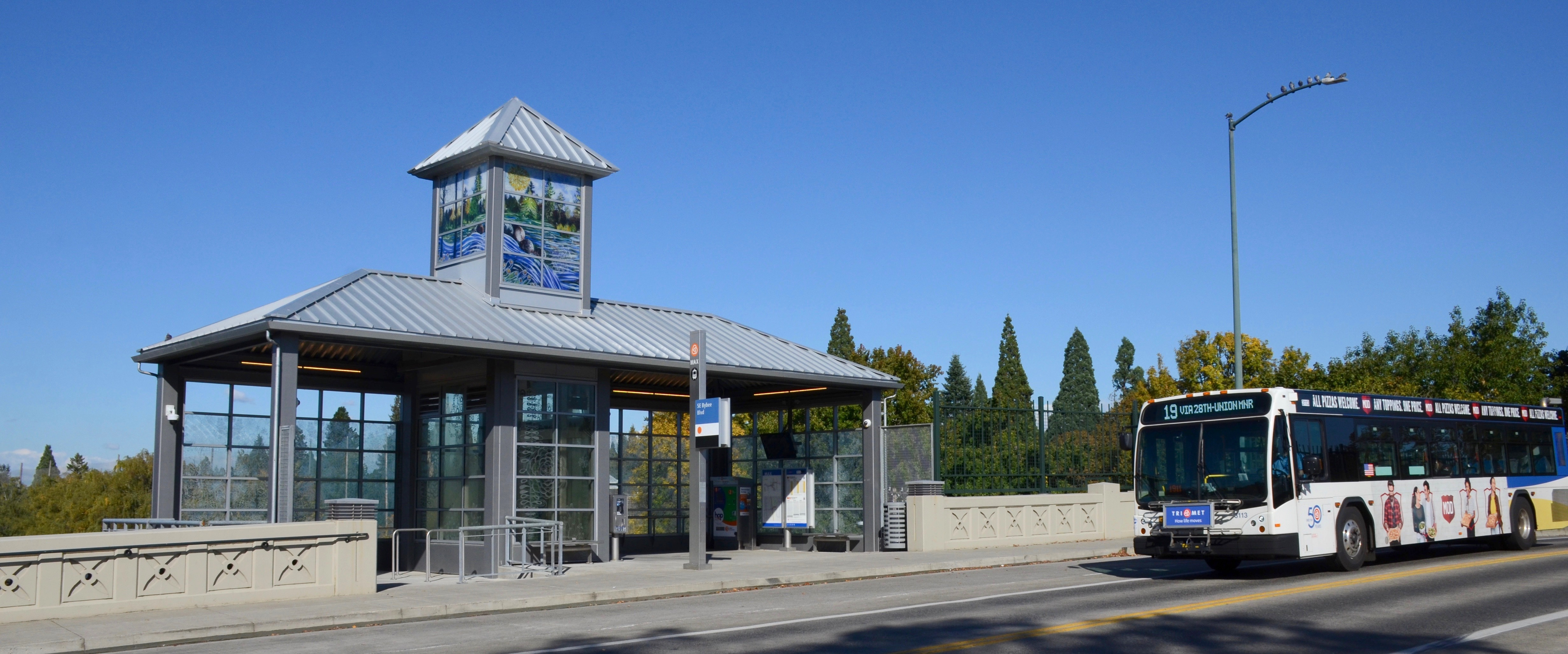
A TriMet bus on then route 19–Woodstock/Glisan passing the station's north entrance, seen in 2019

SE Bybee Blvd station is situated between the SE Tacoma/Johnson Creek and SE 17th Ave & Holgate Blvd stations as the fourth northbound station on the MAX Orange Line, which runs from the station northbound to PSU South/SW 6th & College station in downtown Portland and southbound to SE Park Ave station in Oak Grove. Most northbound Orange Line trains through operate into the Yellow Line at PSU South/SW 6th & College station and continue to Expo Center station in North Portland.

Train headways measure from 15 minutes during most of the day to 30 minutes in the early mornings and late evenings. The station connects with TriMet bus route 4–Fessenden/Woodstock, which serves nearby Reed College. In fall 2024, SE Bybee Blvd was the second least-used station in the MAX system (after SE 17th Ave & Rhine St) with 477 boardings and alightings on weekdays, of which 240 were boardings, as recorded by TriMet.
