= Philadelphia's Steaks and Hoagies =

Restaurant in the U.S. state of Oregon

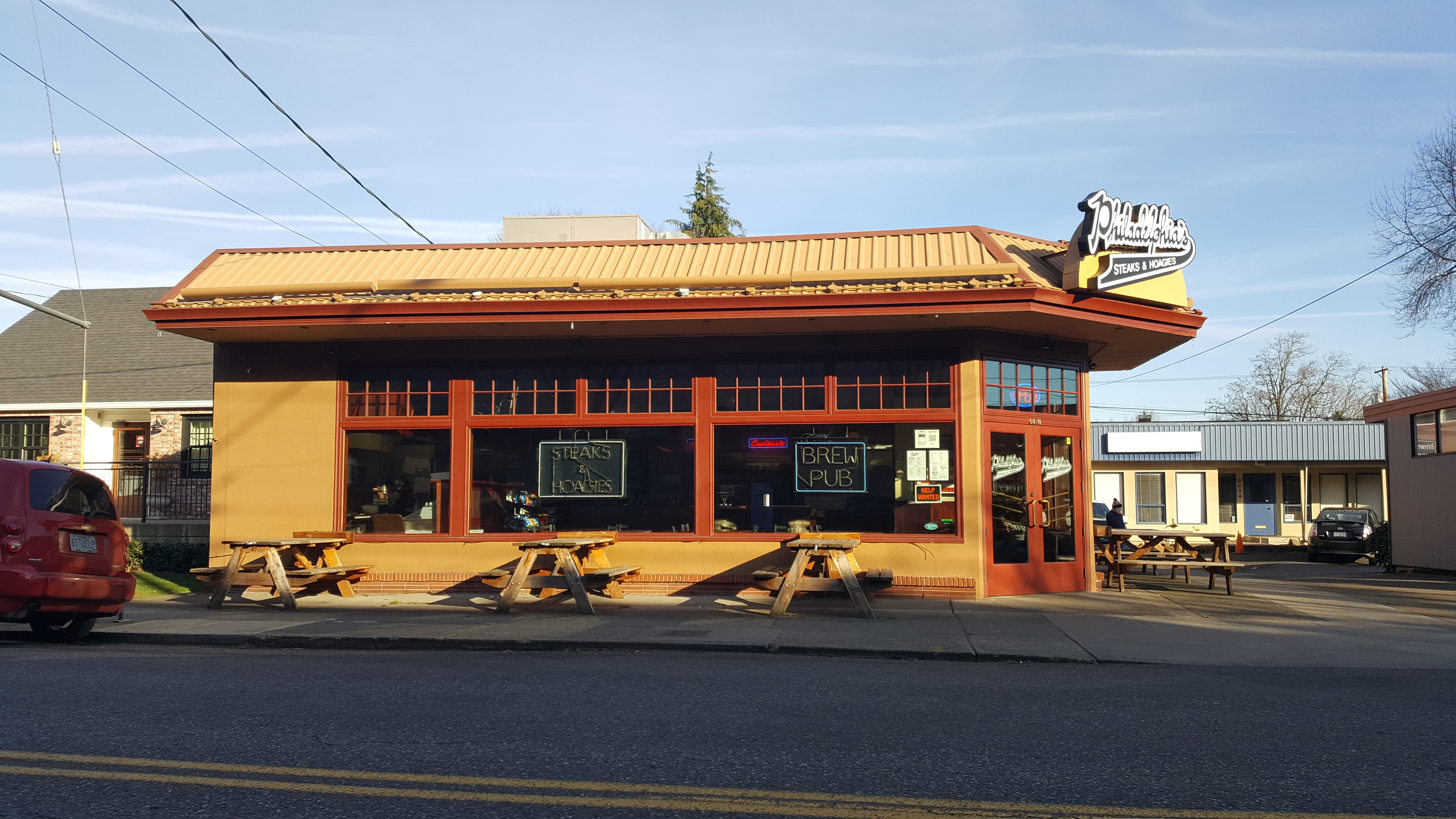
- Exterior of the restaurant in Portland, Oregon's Sellwood-Moreland neighborhood in 2022

Restaurant information
- Established: 1987
- Owners: Steve and Amelia Moore
- Location: Portland; Sisters; West Linn, Oregon, United States
- Website: phillypdx.net

Philadelphia's Steaks and Hoagies is a restaurant with multiple locations in the U.S. state of Oregon. There are two restaurants in the Portland metropolitan area and another in Sisters.

== Description and history ==
Philadelphia's Steaks and Hoagies is a restaurant specializing in cheesesteaks, with multiple locations in Oregon. In the Portland metropolitan area, there are restaurants in the Westmoreland district of southeast Portland's Sellwood-Moreland neighborhood, and in West Linn. There is also a restaurant in Sisters.

The business is owned by spouses Steve and Amelia Moore. The original restaurant opened in 1987. A brewery was added in 1993, and the business began operating as Philadelphia's Steaks & Hoagies Brewery, Oregon's fourteenth microbrewery. A second restaurant opened in West Linn in 2002.

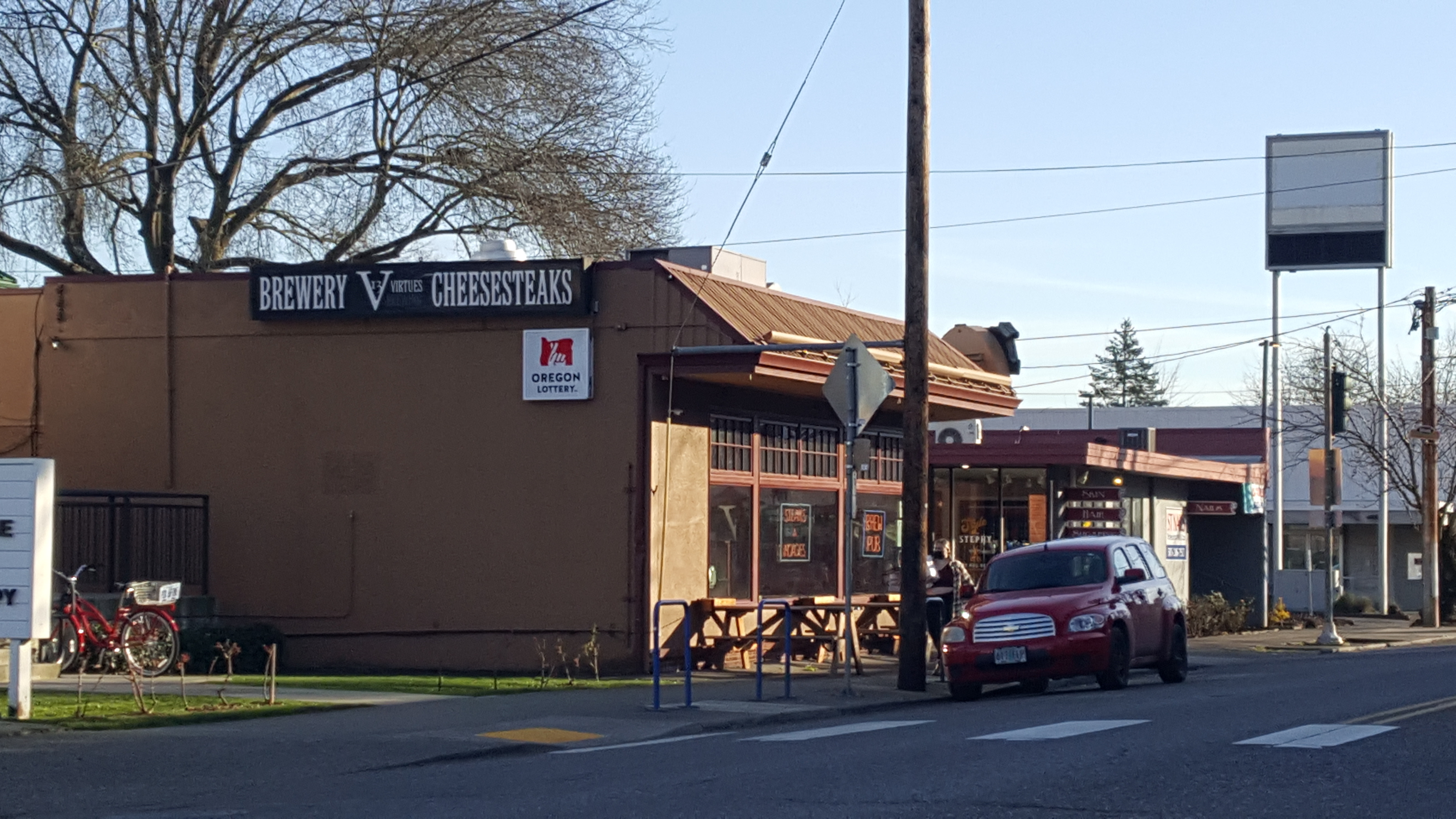
Exterior of 13 Virtues Brewing, 2022

In 2012, Moore rebranded the brewery as 13 Virtues Brewing Co. By 2014, Moore had expanded the Sellwood-Moreland restaurant with an adjacent 3,000-square-foot brewery and taproom.

== Reception ==
In 2004, Ryan Anfuso of the Portland State Vanguard described the menu as "simple and authentic" and wrote, "When all is said and done, Philadelphia's stands as one of Portland’s best sandwich shops." Drew Tyson included 13 Virtues Brewing in Thrillist's 2015 list of "Where to Get the 11 Best Cheesesteaks in Portland".
