= Oaks Bottom Public House =

Restaurant in Portland, Oregon, U.S.

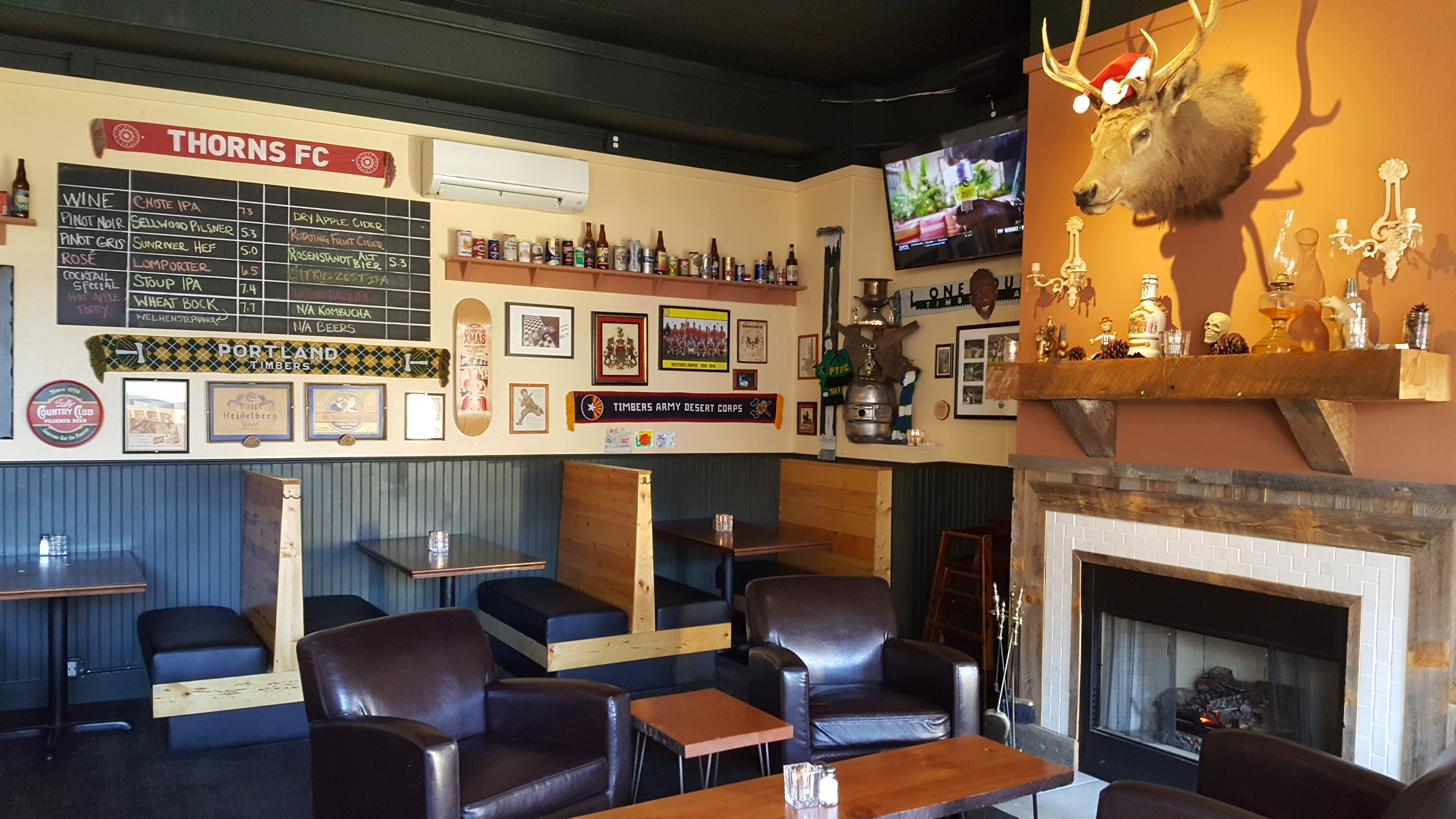
- The restaurant's interior in 2022
- Interactive map of Oaks Bottom Public House

Restaurant information
- Established: 2006
- Owner: Jerry Fechter
- Previous owner: Jim Parker
- Location: 1621 Southeast Bybee Boulevard, Portland, Multnomah, Oregon, 97202, United States
- Coordinates: 45.4739°N 122.6494°W
- Website: oaksbottom.com

Oaks Bottom Public House is a restaurant in Portland, Oregon, United States. Established in 2006, the business is located in the Westmoreland district of southeast Portland's Sellwood-Moreland neighborhood. It has been owned and operated by Jerry Fechter.

== Description ==
Oaks Bottom Public House is a restaurant on Bybee Boulevard in the Westmoreland district of southeast Portland's Sellwood-Moreland neighborhood. Alex Frane of Eater Portland has described Oaks Bottom as a "family-friendly, wood-lined" restaurant, which is named after the Oaks Bottom Wildlife Refuge, a nearby natural wetlands.

The menu includes "totchos" (tater tots as nachos); toppings include cheddar and jack cheese, jalapeños, olives, red onions, salsa, scallions, sour cream, and tomatoes, with avocado, chicken, and pulled pork as additional options.

== History ==
Established in 2006, the restaurant has been owned and operated by Jerry Fechter. Fechter's late business partner Jim Parker has been credited for creating totchos. Eater Portland's Krista Garcia wrote, "This Sellwood brewpub doesn't claim to be the inventor of totchos but there's evidence to prove it popularized the portmanteau." In addition to co-owning Oaks Bottom, Parker had helped open Concordia Ale House and the Horse Brass Pub.

Oaks Bottom was affiliated with Lompoc Brewing, which was also owned by Fechter, and served the beer on site. Following Lompoc's closure in 2019, Oaks Bottom continued "as its own entity", serving Lompoc beer while supplies lasted. Oaks Bottom "[transitioned] into a standard neighborhood bar", according to Brooke Jackson-Glidden of Eater Portland.

The restaurant has participated in the Portland Mercury's annual Nachos Week and Wing Week. For the 2019 event, Oaks Bottom served Sellwoods Spicy Buffalo Totchos, described as "crispy tater tots smothered with jalapeño and pepper jack queso and topped with Lompoc Brewing's Lomporter-braised beef". In March 2020, when the restaurant closed temporarily because of the COVID-19 pandemic, the business issued a press release which said, "Due to increased concern for the spread of COVID-19, we've made the decision to temporarily shut our doors until further notice. Like many in our industry, we are concerned about the role restaurants are playing in the ongoing spread of the virus. ... Be safe, be well, and wash your hands!"

== Reception ==
In 2016, Oaks Bottom ranked number 60 in MEDIAmerica's first annual 100 Best Fan-Favorite Destinations in Oregon list, based on 22,000 reviews on Google, Tripadvisor and Yelp. Eater Portland's Alex Frane included the totchos in a 2019 list of eighteen "bar snacks ideal for any night out" in the city, and Krista Garcia included Oaks Bottom in a 2022 overview of "where to find tasty totchos and other loaded tots in Portland". Jackson-Glidden included the totchos in Eater Portland's 2024 overview of "iconic" Portland dishes.
