= Bybee Bridge =

Bridge in Portland, Oregon, U.S.

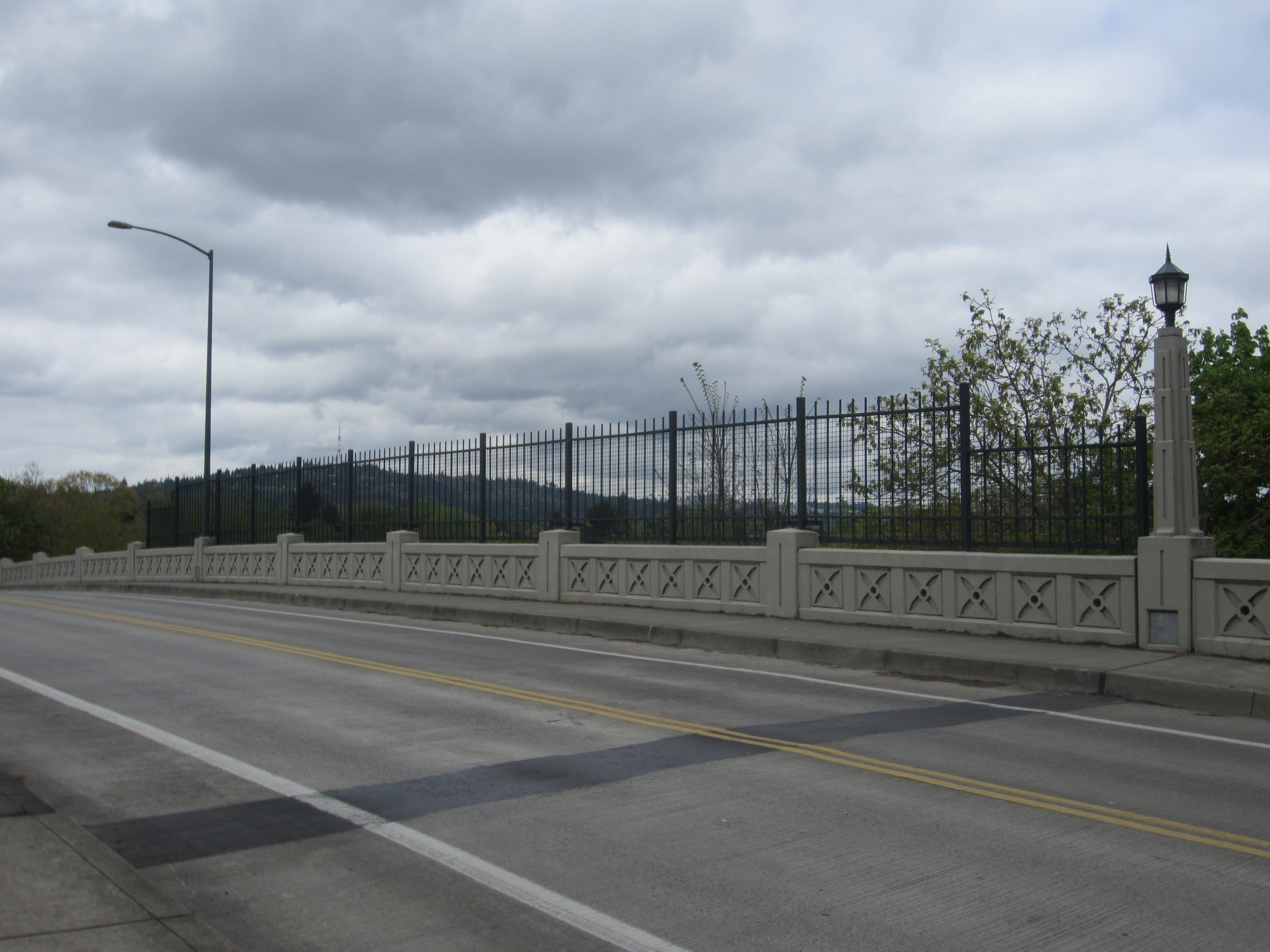
- Bybee Bridge in 2012
- Coordinates: 45°28′28″N 122°38′24″W
- Crosses: OR 99E (McLoughlin Boulevard)
- Locale: Portland, Oregon, U.S.
- Maintained by: Oregon Department of Transportation

The Bybee Bridge is a bridge over McLoughlin Boulevard (Oregon Route 99E) in southeast Portland, Oregon connecting the Eastmoreland and Sellwood neighborhoods. The bridge is named after James Francis Bybee.

== History ==
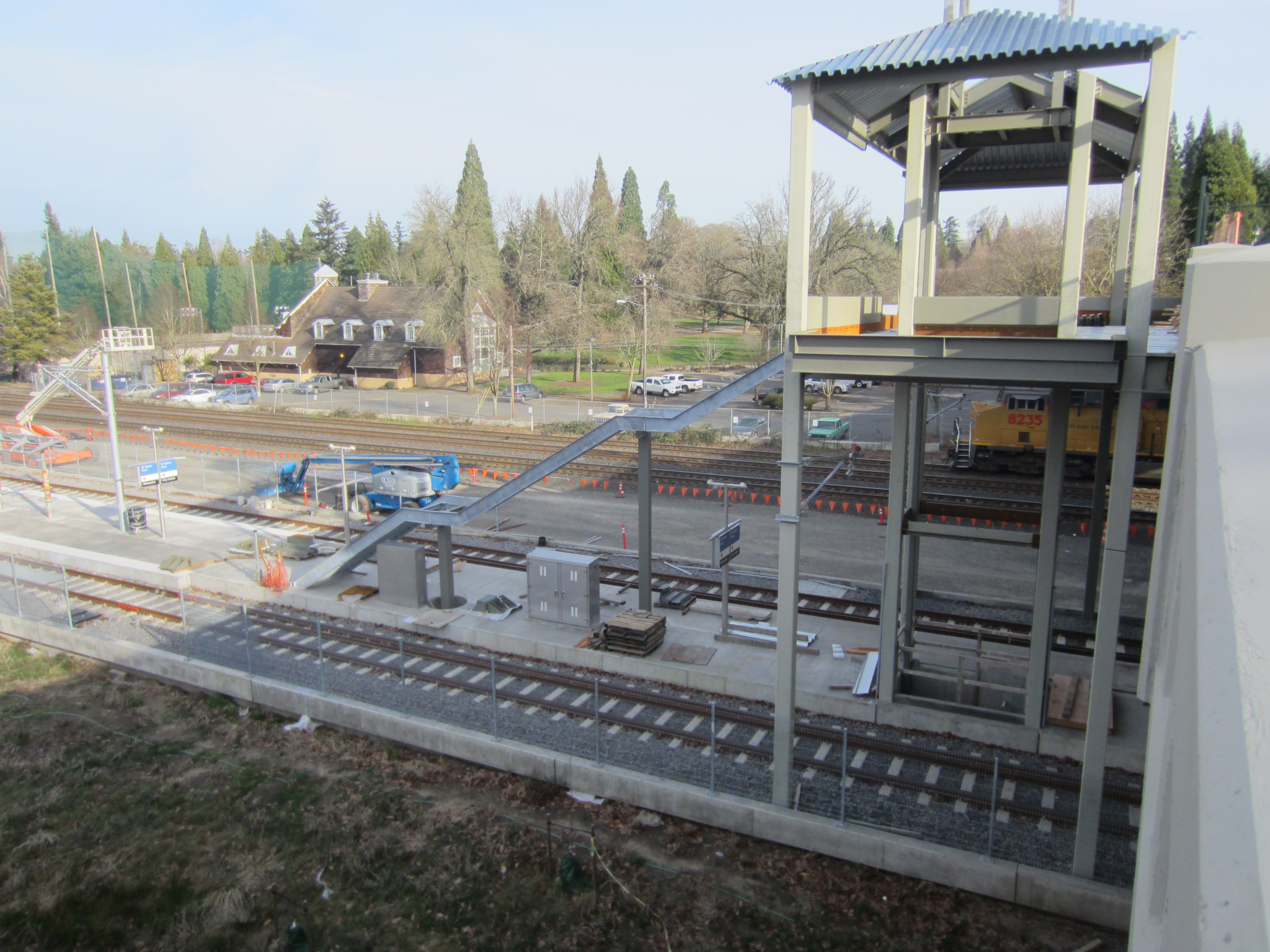
MAX Light Rail construction on and below the bridge, January 2015

The original Bybee Bridge consisted of three different structures built between 1911 and 1943. The Ladd Estate Company built the first Bybee Bridge in 1911 to serve its real estate developments, as well as the newly established Reed College, in Eastmoreland. The bridge afforded the only direct connection to Eastmoreland from Sellwood-Moreland in the west with a grade-separated crossing over the Southern Pacific (SP) railroad tracks, which had been there since 1869, built by the Oregon Central Railroad. UP acquired the railroad in 1996. Improvements were made to the Bybee Bridge in 1934 and 1943.

The first Bybee Bridge initially included a streetcar line operated by the Portland Railway, Light and Power Company called "Eastmoreland" that spurred from the Sellwood line on Milwaukie Avenue in Sellwood, crossed the Bybee Bridge, and terminated at 32nd and Rex in Eastmoreland. The Eastmoreland line was converted to trolley buses, Portland's first such service, in 1936, and converted again to motor buses after 1956.

In the early 2000s, structural analysis determined the bridge did not provide adequate clearance for trucks driving below, concrete girders were damaged from collisions, and suitable bike lines and sidewalks were not available.

In 2004 the bridge was partially rebuilt by Capital Concrete Construction Inc., closing in February and re-opening in November ahead of schedule. 80 percent of the $3–4 million renovation project came from federal funds; 10 percent each was paid by the city of Portland and the Oregon Department of Transportation.

By April 2005 cracks had already started to appear in the concrete. According to the supervising bridge engineer, the cracks "did not pose any threat to the integrity of the bridge."

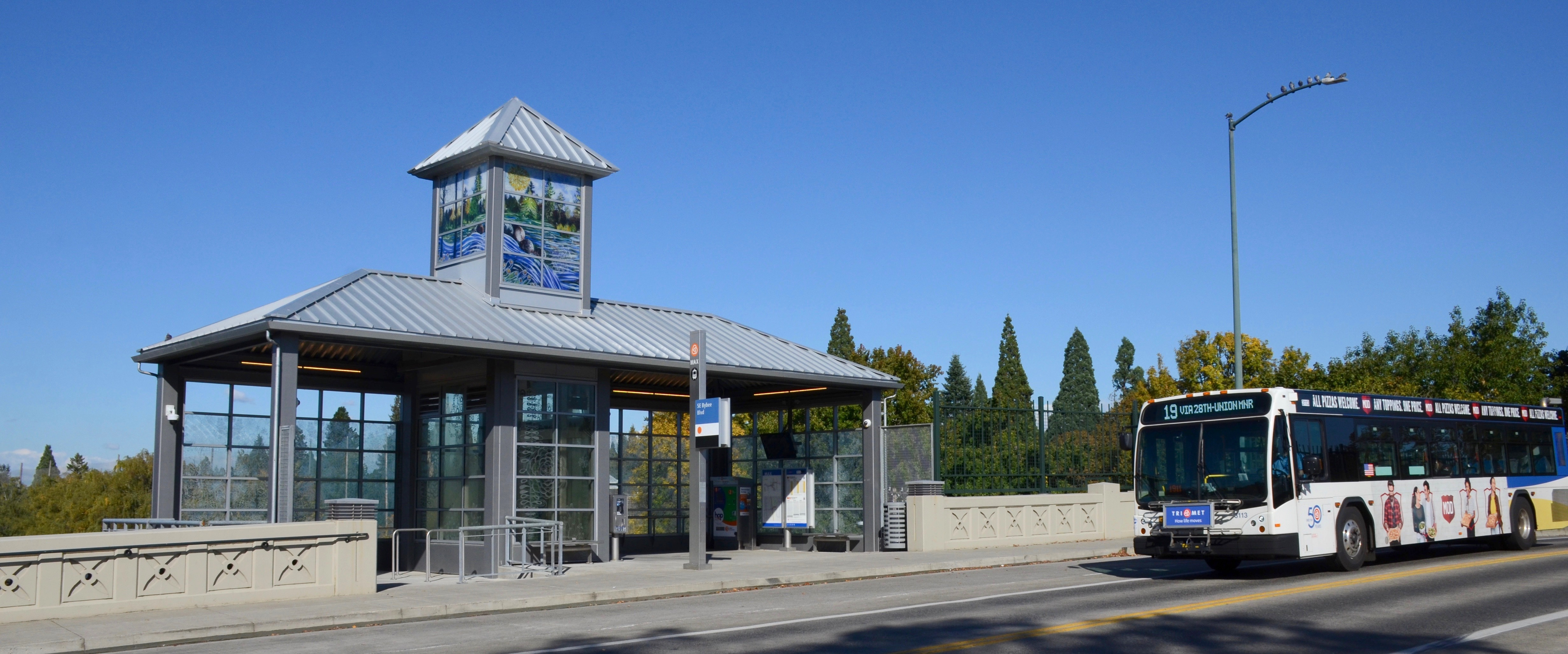
The entrance to the SE Bybee Blvd. MAX station, on the bridge, with a bus passing

During construction of the Southeast Bybee Boulevard station on the MAX Orange Line, the bridge was widened and elevators and bus pullouts were installed. The station is an island platform located underneath the overpass, with a cupola on the bridge serving as an entrance.

== Bioswale ==
According to The Conservation Registry the Bybee Bridge Bioswale, located at the northwest side of the bridge to treat stormwater, was also completed in November 2004. The bioswale contains mostly mowed grass which drains water from the bridge to Crystral Springs. A September 2011 survey of the project showed low invasive species activity but noted the presence of blackberry, morning glory and other weeds. Native plants such as alder, ash, cattail, cottonwood, Douglas-fir, rushes and sedges were also present.

== See also ==
- Bybee–Howell House, the Sauvie Island house built by James Francis Bybee
- Transportation in Portland, Oregon
