= Westmoreland Park =

Public park in Portland, Oregon, U.S.

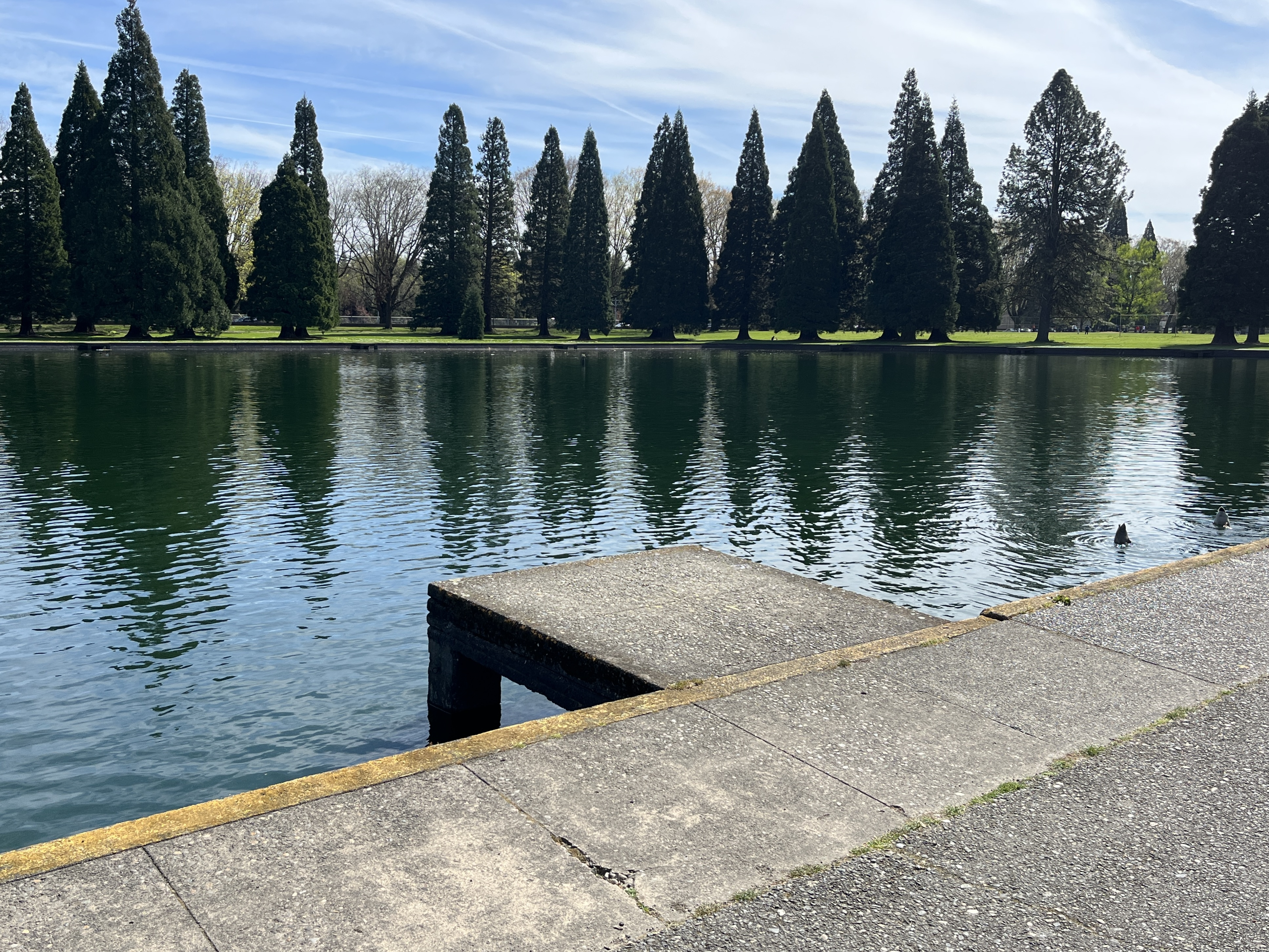
- Pond at the park, 2026

- Location within Portland, Oregon
- Location: SE McLoughlin Blvd. and Bybee Blvd. Portland, Oregon
- Coordinates: 45°28′14″N 122°38′23″W
- Area: 43.09 acres (17.44 ha)
- Created: 1936
- Operator: Portland Parks & Recreation
- Open: 5 a.m. to midnight daily
- Public transit: SE Bybee Blvd; 19

Westmoreland Park is a municipal park located in the Westmoreland area of southeast Portland, Oregon's Westmoreland neighborhood, United States. The property for the park was acquired in 1936 and encompasses 42.01 acres (17.00 ha). Located along McLoughlin Boulevard, the park straddles Crystal Springs Creek just downstream from the Crystal Springs Rhododendron Garden. The park is operated by Portland Parks & Recreation and includes sports fields, a playground, and a pond. The Royal Rosarian Milk Carton Boat Race takes place every summer in the park's casting pond.

== History ==
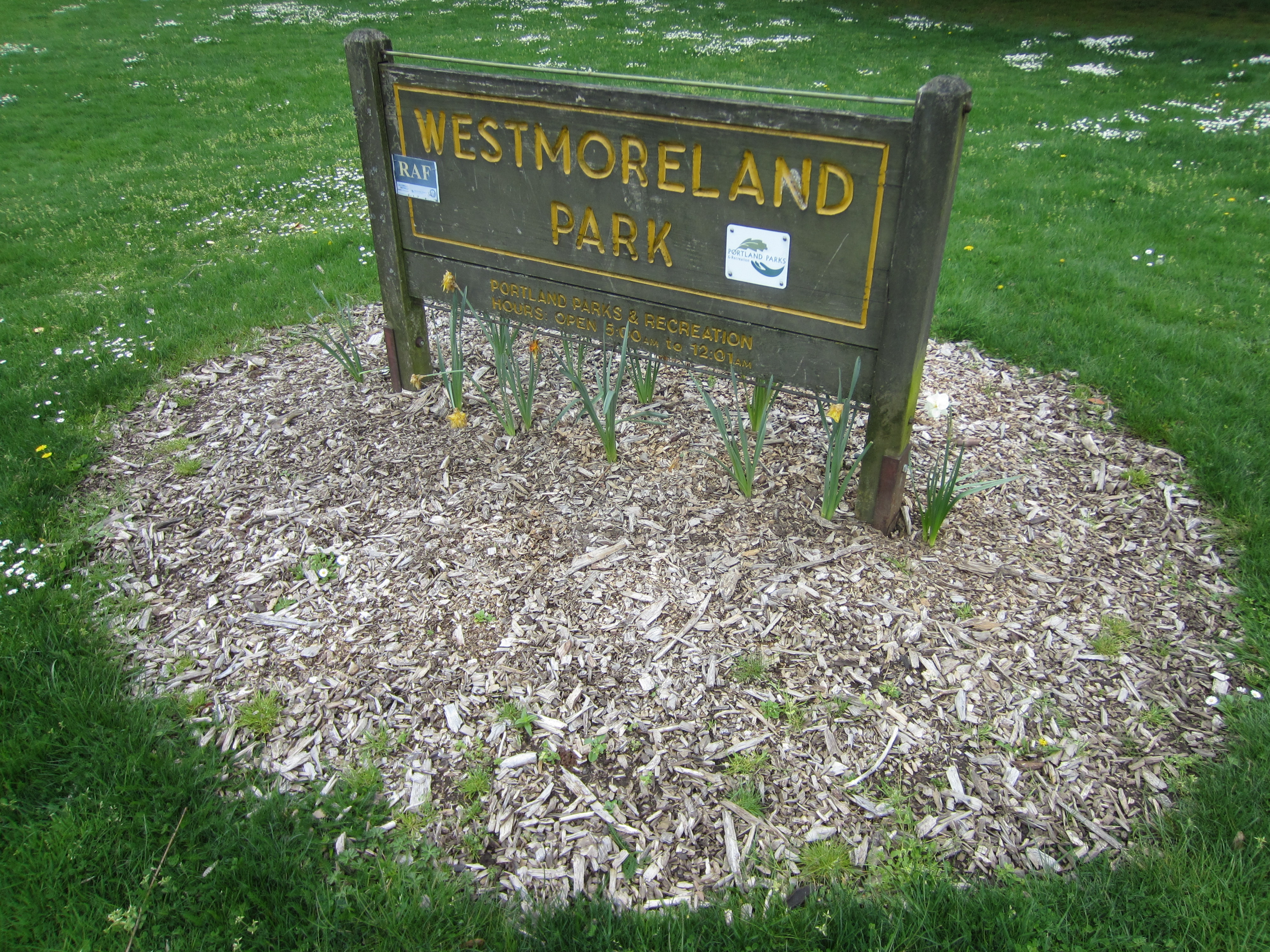
Park signage in 2012

Prior to becoming a park, the land where Westmoreland Park sits was used for farming, a golf course, and even a landing strip. The landing strip was originally known as simply aviation field, but in October 1919 became Broomfield Aviation Field. It was named after a student at Reed College, Hugh Broomfield, who was a pilot who died during World War I while in combat. In 1936, the city bought 45 acres (18 ha) from the Oregon Iron & Steel Company for use as a park, with Francis Benedict Jacobberger then commissioned to develop a plan for the new park. Among other things, the plan called for a lagoon and pond that were to be used as ice rinks in winter. Construction began on the park the same year, with labor provided by the Works Progress Administration. The casting pond was completed that year, but about June 1937 other construction halted due to funding, but resumed in July 1939. A baseball stadium was added in 1942, which was named Sckavone Field in 1955. Lawn bowling was added in 1945, and a restroom in 1949.

After repeated flooding issues and the degradation of the water infrastructure in the park, a new master plan was developed to re-imagine the natural water features, which the plan was completed in 2003. Construction on the revamped park was completed in 2014, with it re-opening in October 2014. The project included conversion of the duck pond into wetlands, the installation of a nature-based playground featuring boulders and logs, and the addition of more paths. The restoration of the wetlands allowed for the return of migrating salmon to the stream. The United States Army Corps of Engineers assisted on the project, which cost $1 million to complete.

== Amenities ==
The park has a variety of sports features including a baseball diamonds, a football field, a soccer field, and a softball field. The southern end of the park is occupied by Sckavone Stadium, which is used for baseball. There are also tennis and basketball courts. Other features include a playground, paths, picnic area and tables, and a restroom. Uroboros is an outdoor sculpture by Charles Kibby, installed in 1979.

== See also ==
- List of parks in Portland, Oregon
