= Berkeley Park =

Berkeley Park may refer to:

- Berkeley Park, Atlanta, a neighborhood in Atlanta, Georgia
- Berkeley Park (Portland, Oregon), a public park in Portland, Oregon
