= Julius C. Moreland =

American judge

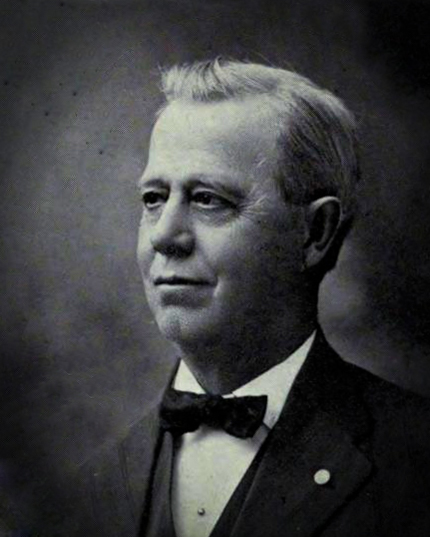
- Born: June 1, 1844; Smith County, Tennessee
- Died: February 2, 1918 (aged 73); Salem, Oregon
- Resting place: Lone Fir Cemetery; 45.518052°N 122.642222°W
- Education: Portland Academy
- Occupations: Caples and Moreland 1868 – 1874; Portland City Council 1872 – 1875; Portland City Attorney 1877 – 1881; Moreland and Masters 1886 – 1890; Multnomah County Judge 1890 – 1894; Oregon Supreme Court Clerk 1907 – 1918
- Years active: 1867 – 1918
- Political party: Republican
- Spouse: Abbie B. Kline
- Children: Harvev, Susie (Gill), Eldon, Julius, Lueen (Moores)
- Parent(s): Jesse Moreland, Susan Robertson

Signature
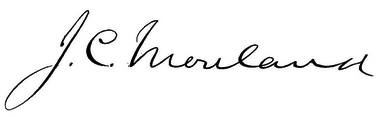

Julius Caesar Moreland (June 1, 1844 – February 2, 1918) was an Oregon pioneer, a successful lawyer, and a judge based in Portland, Oregon. He was also Clerk of the Oregon Supreme Court in Salem in the early 20th century. He is the namesake of the Eastmoreland, Westmoreland, and Sellwood – Moreland neighborhoods.

== Early life and education ==
Moreland was born in 1844 in Smith County, Tennessee, to parents Jesse Moreland and Susan Robertson. Julius Caesar was a name given to at least two other relatives in the Robertson family tree. Through his mother's side of the family, Moreland could trace his lineage to Major Charles Robertson, a soldier in the American Revolutionary War. Julius was the youngest of nine children, and his father was a farmer and a Methodist preacher.

In 1848 the Moreland family moved to Macoupin County, Illinois, where they farmed for two years, then for two years Jesse Moreland operated a store. In 1852 the family joined a train of 20 wagons heading west on the Oregon Trail. They arrived in the Oregon Territory in October, 1852, and by November Jesse had settled a Donation Land Claim for 320 acres near the town of Needy. Beginning in 1860, Julius worked in Portland as a printer at the Oregon Farmer until the publication closed in 1863. At the time it was Oregon's only agricultural newspaper. He graduated from the Portland Academy in 1865, then from 1865 to 1867 Moreland read law in the offices of former Portland Mayor David Logan and began his legal career in Eastern Oregon and the Idaho Territory. He worked for a year at the Idaho Statesman and upon his return to Portland, he worked briefly as foreman at The Oregonian.

Moreland married Abbie Kline, an 1853 pioneer from Kansas, in 1867 in Boise, Idaho.

== Career ==
In 1868 Moreland formed a partnership, Caples and Moreland, with Portland attorney John F. Caples, an association that lasted until 1874. Moreland served on the Portland City Council from 1872 to 1875, and he was Portland City Attorney from 1877 to 1881. In 1885 Governor Moody appointed him judge of Multnomah County to complete an unelected term for one year, and when his term ended he formed a partnership with William York Masters, Moreland and Masters, that ended in 1890 when Moreland was elected judge of the Multnomah County Court for four years.

Judge Moreland moved to Salem in 1907 to become Clerk of the Oregon Supreme Court, an appointment he would keep until his sudden death in 1918.

== Moreland plats in Southeast Portland ==
Judge Moreland was an executive of the Portland Realty Company, and when the company platted Crystal Springs Farm for housing, the design included four neighborhoods: Westmoreland (1909), Eastmoreland (1910), Southmoreland, and Northmoreland.

At the time of the Crystal Springs Addition, Judge Moreland was working in Salem as the Clerk of the Oregon Supreme Court, and he may have played only a minor role in the real estate developments named for him. Also, the Portland Realty Company was not the agent of the Ladd Estate Management Company which owned the property. Ladd sold the property to the public through a subsidiary known as the Columbia Trust Co.

After development of the Westmoreland and Eastmoreland neighborhoods, the area surrounding the intersection of SE Milwaukie Avenue and Bybee Boulevard became known informally as Moreland. The Moreland Theater, the Moreland Presbyterian Church, and the more recent Moreland Farmers Pantry are examples of the popular evolution of the geographic names of Westmoreland and Eastmoreland. Sellwood – Moreland is another designation that was not originally intended but evolved to satisfy the needs of residents.

== See also ==
- History of Portland, Oregon
