= Uroboros (sculpture) =

Sculpture in Portland, Oregon

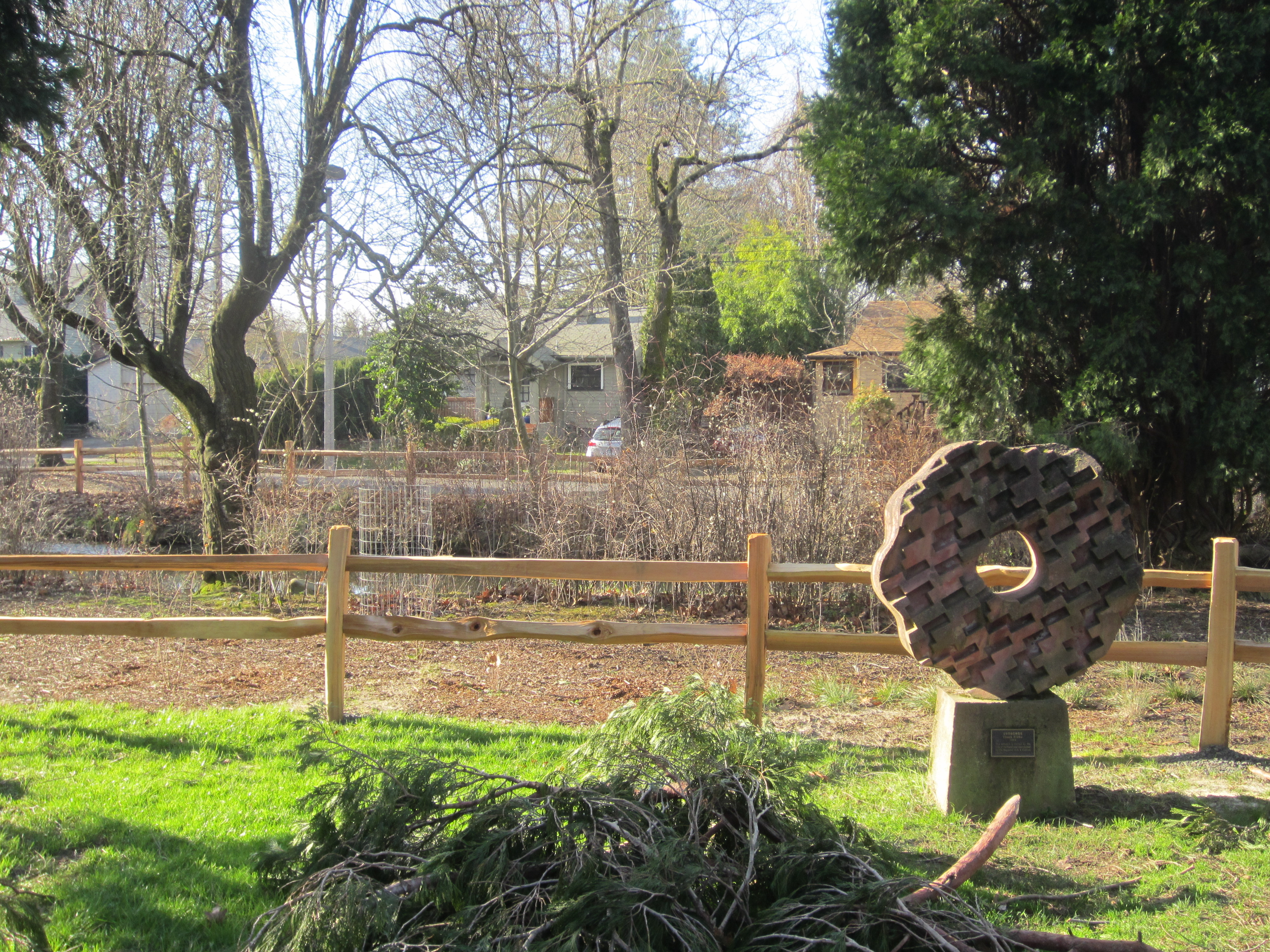
- The sculpture in 2015
- Artist: Charles Kibby
- Year: 1979
- Type: Sculpture
- Medium: Cast concrete
- Subject: Uroboros
- Location: Portland, Oregon, United States; 45°28′09″N 122°38′31″W
- Owner: City of Portland and Multnomah County Public Art Collection courtesy of the Regional Arts & Culture Council

Uroboros is an outdoor 1979 sculpture by Charles Kibby, located at Westmoreland Park in the Sellwood neighborhood of southeast Portland, Oregon. It is a modern depiction of the uroboros, an ancient Egyptian and Greek symbol depicting a serpent or dragon eating its own tail.

== Description and history ==
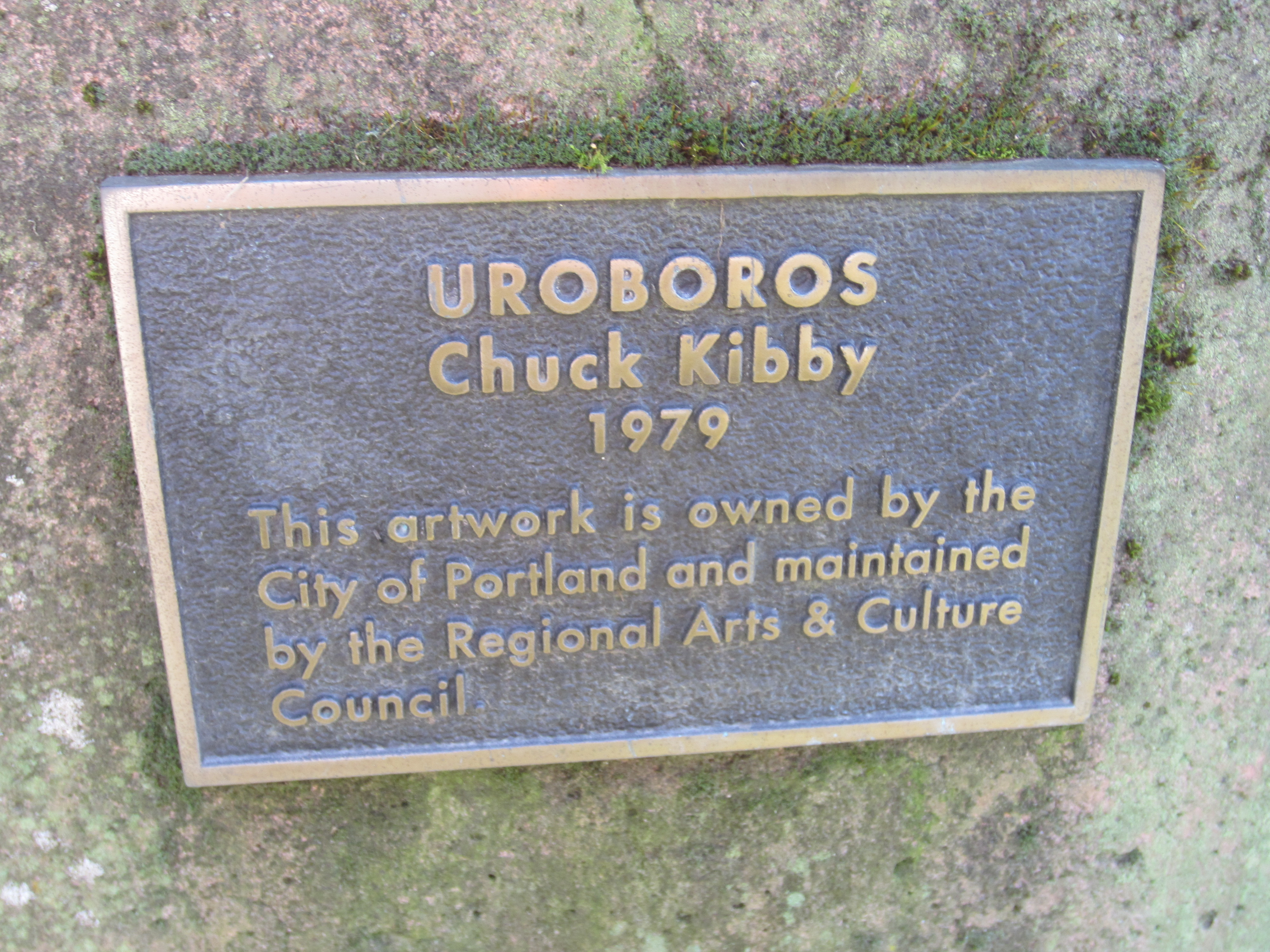
Plaque for the sculpture

According to the Regional Arts & Culture Council, which administers the work, the cast concrete sculpture measures 48 inches (120 cm) x 14 inches (36 cm) x 72 inches (180 cm) and rests on a base that measures 24 inches (61 cm) x 20 inches (51 cm) x 20 inches (51 cm). The organization lists "MAC 1979–80" as the funding source. However, the Smithsonian Institution lists the sculpture's measurements as 45 inches (110 cm) x 45 inches (110 cm) x 16 inches (41 cm), on a base that measures approximately 21 inches (53 cm) x 20 inches (51 cm) x 16 inches (41 cm). The Smithsonian categorizes Uroboros as abstract ("geometric") and notes that it was commissioned by the Comprehensive Employment and Training Act (CETA) before being donated to the park.

The sculpture is part of the City of Portland and Multnomah County Public Art Collection courtesy of the Regional Arts & Culture Council.

== See also ==
- 1979 in art
- CETA Employment of Artists
