= Crystal Springs Rhododendron Garden =

Botanical garden in Portland, Oregon, United States

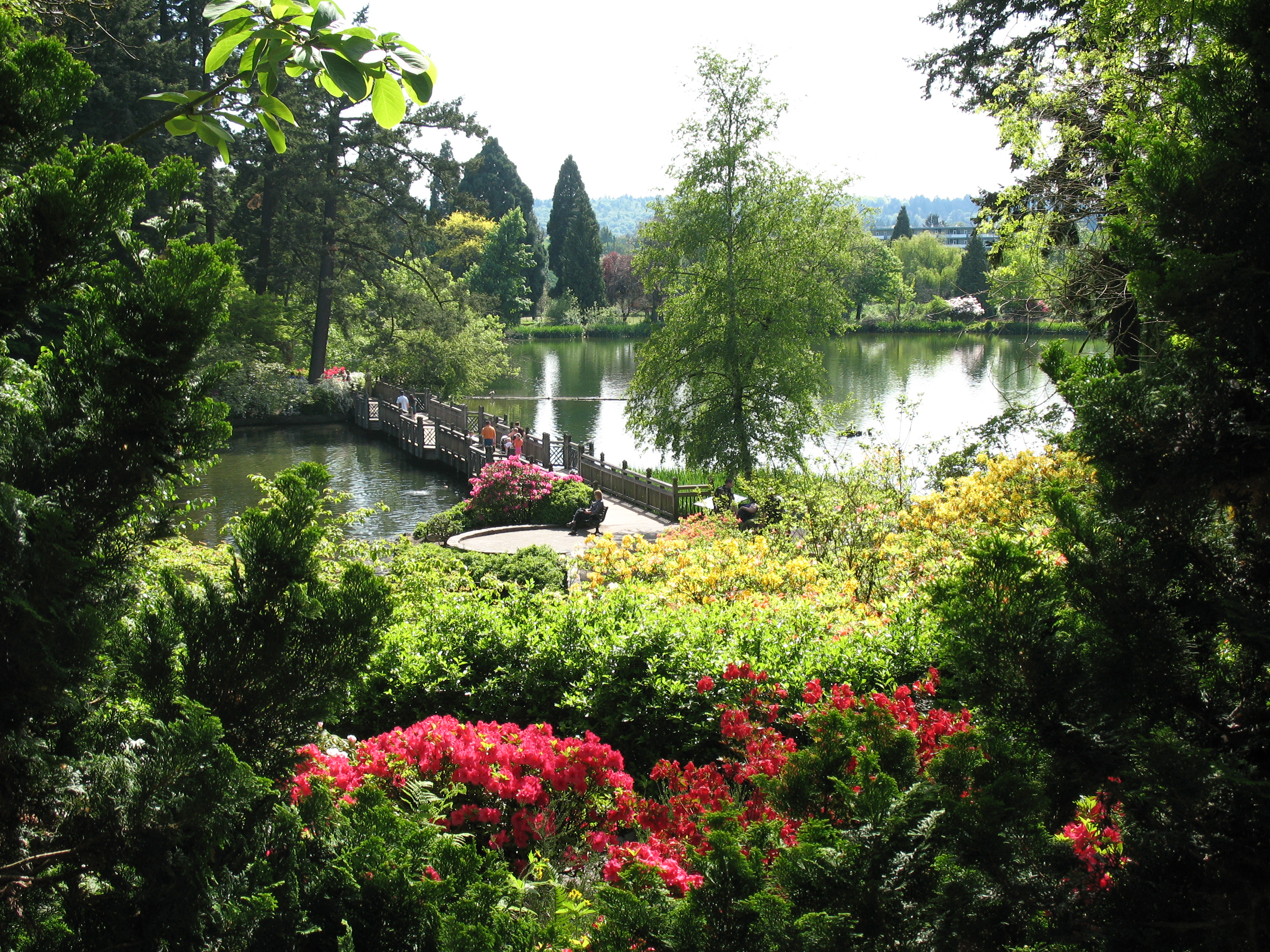
- A lake in the garden.

- Location within Portland, Oregon Location within Oregon Location within the United States
- Interactive map of Crystal Springs Rhododendron Garden
- Type: Botanical garden
- Location: SE 28th Ave. and Woodstock Blvd. Portland, Oregon
- Coordinates: 45°28′47″N 122°38′8″W
- Area: 9.49 acres (3.84 ha)
- Opened: 1950
- Operator: Portland Parks & Recreation
- Plants: 2,500
- Public transit: SE Bybee Blvd; 19
- Website: www.crystalspringsgardenpdx.org

Crystal Springs Rhododendron Garden is a botanical garden located between Reed College and the Eastmoreland Golf Course in southeastern Portland in the U.S. state of Oregon.

== Description and history ==
The garden, located between Southeast 28th Avenue and Woodstock Boulevard, covers 9.49 acres (3.84 ha) and is named for the numerous springs within the garden. Crystal Springs Garden features more than 2,500 rhododendrons, azaleas, and other plants in a setting of small lakes, paved and unpaved paths, fountain, and small waterfalls.

The garden is open 10:00am to 5:00pm Thursday through Tuesday, and 1:00pm to 5:00pm on Wednesdays (gates close at 5:30). Pets are allowed on a leash.

The project began in 1950 as a rhododendron test garden on a site previously covered with brush, blackberries, native trees, and the remnants of a Shakespeare theater developed by students of Reed College. In 1964, the park's name was officially changed to Crystal Springs Rhododendron Garden.

In addition to the manicured areas that make up most of the garden, patches of less orderly shrubs, upland forest, marsh vegetation, and submerged logs attract wildlife, especially waterfowl, most prevalent in winter. The Rhododendron Society has counted 94 species in the garden, including grebes, herons, ducks, Canada geese, wigeons, gulls, thrushes, nuthatches, hummingbirds, and others.

== Gallery ==
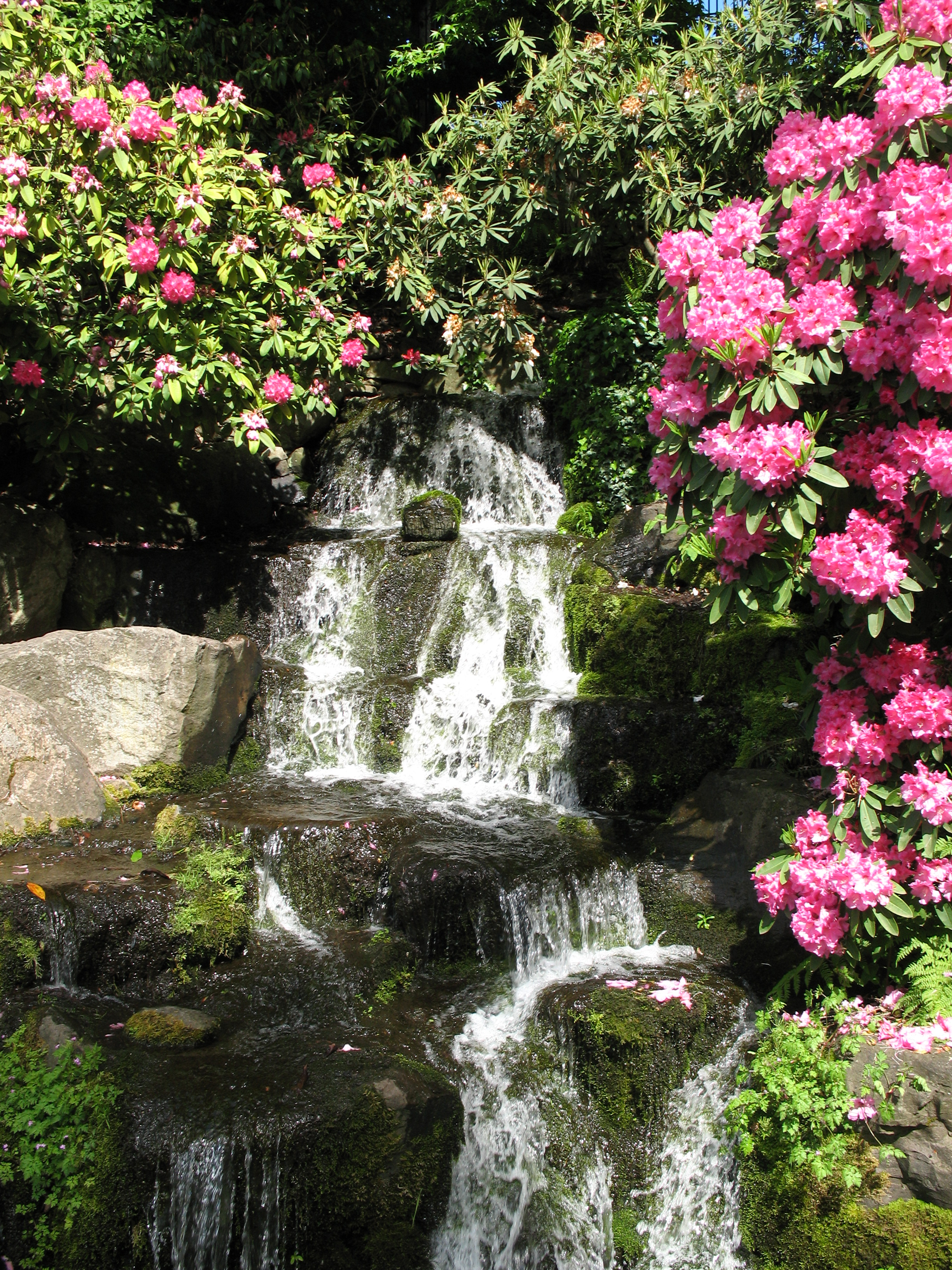

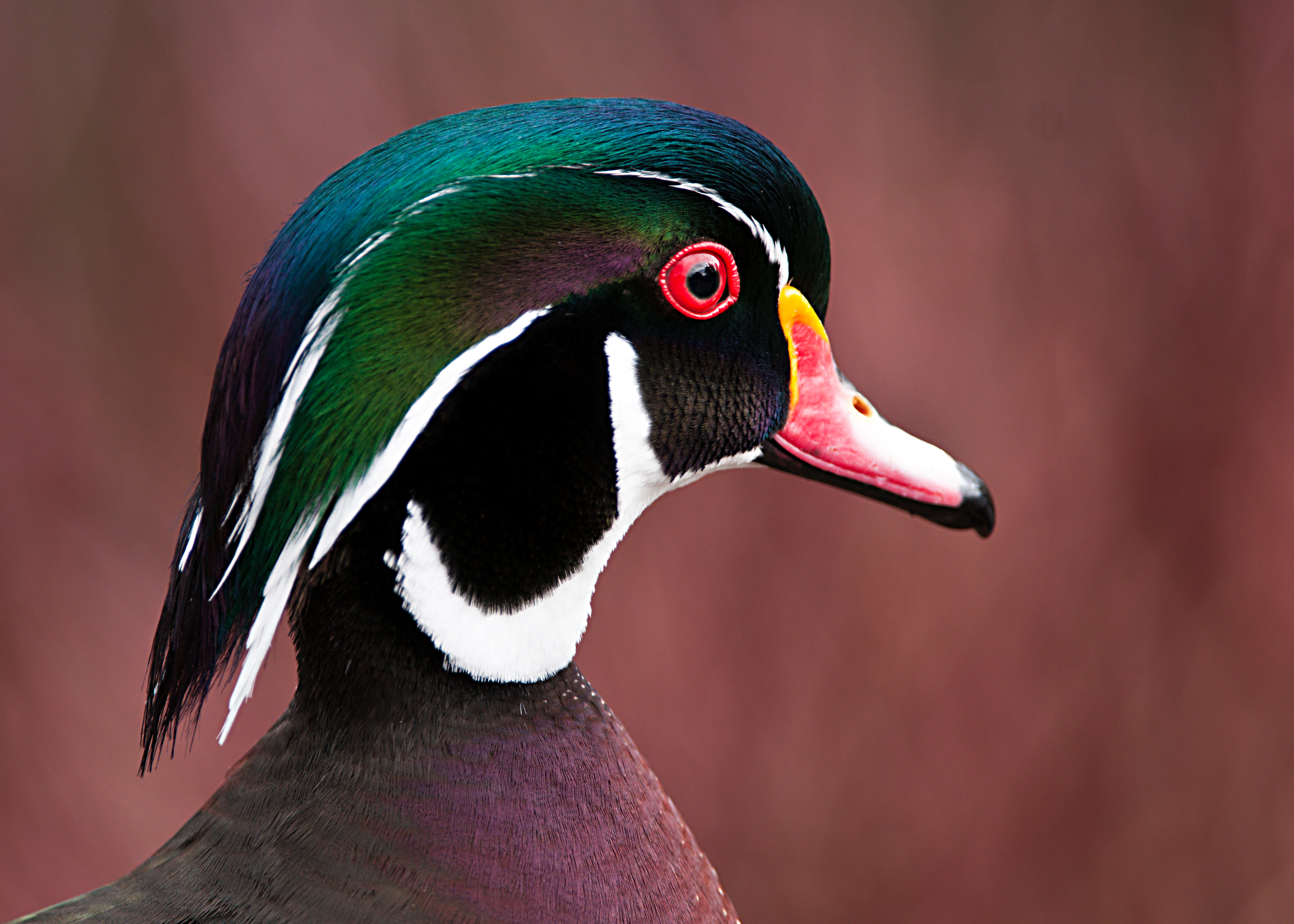

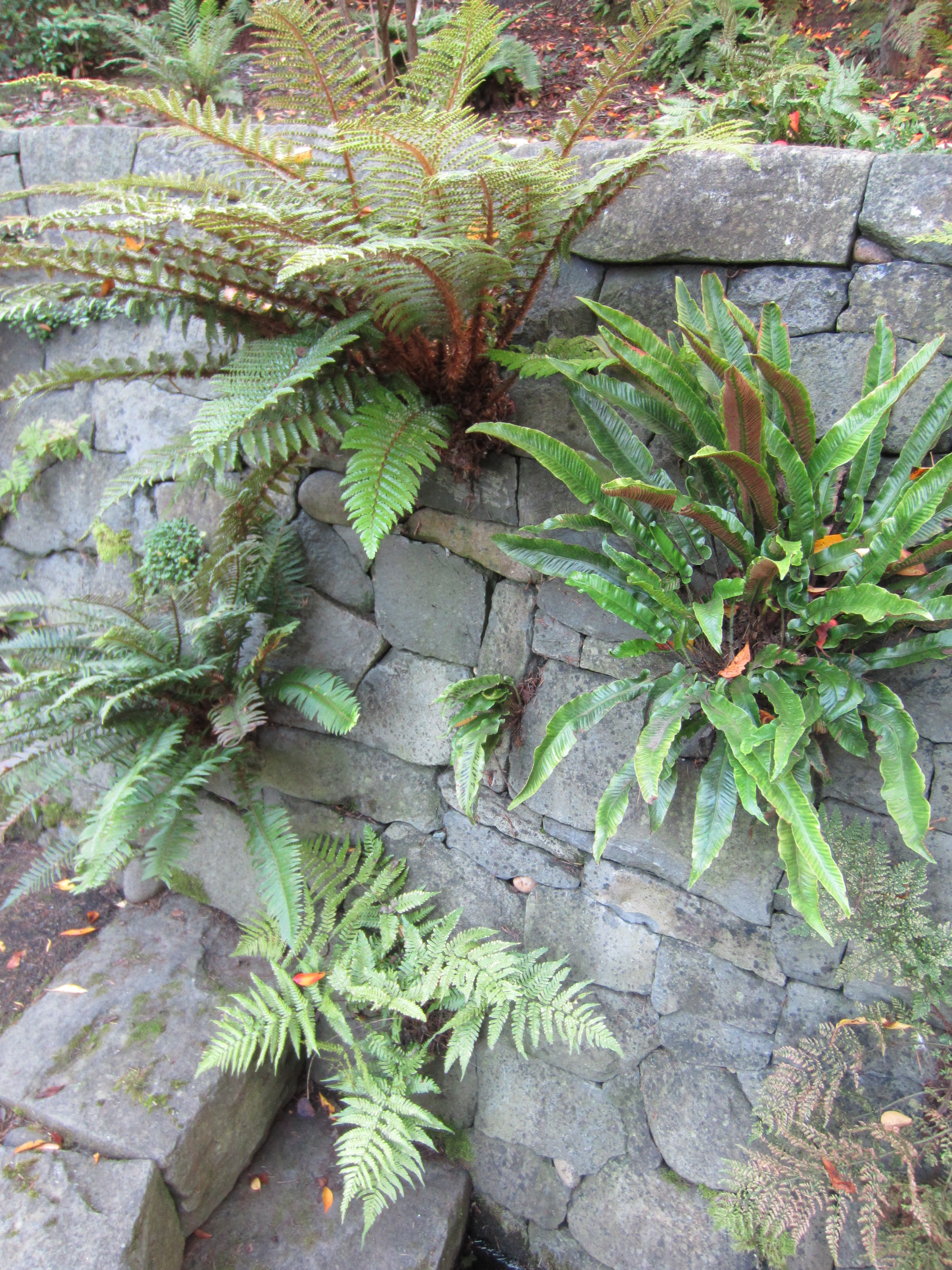

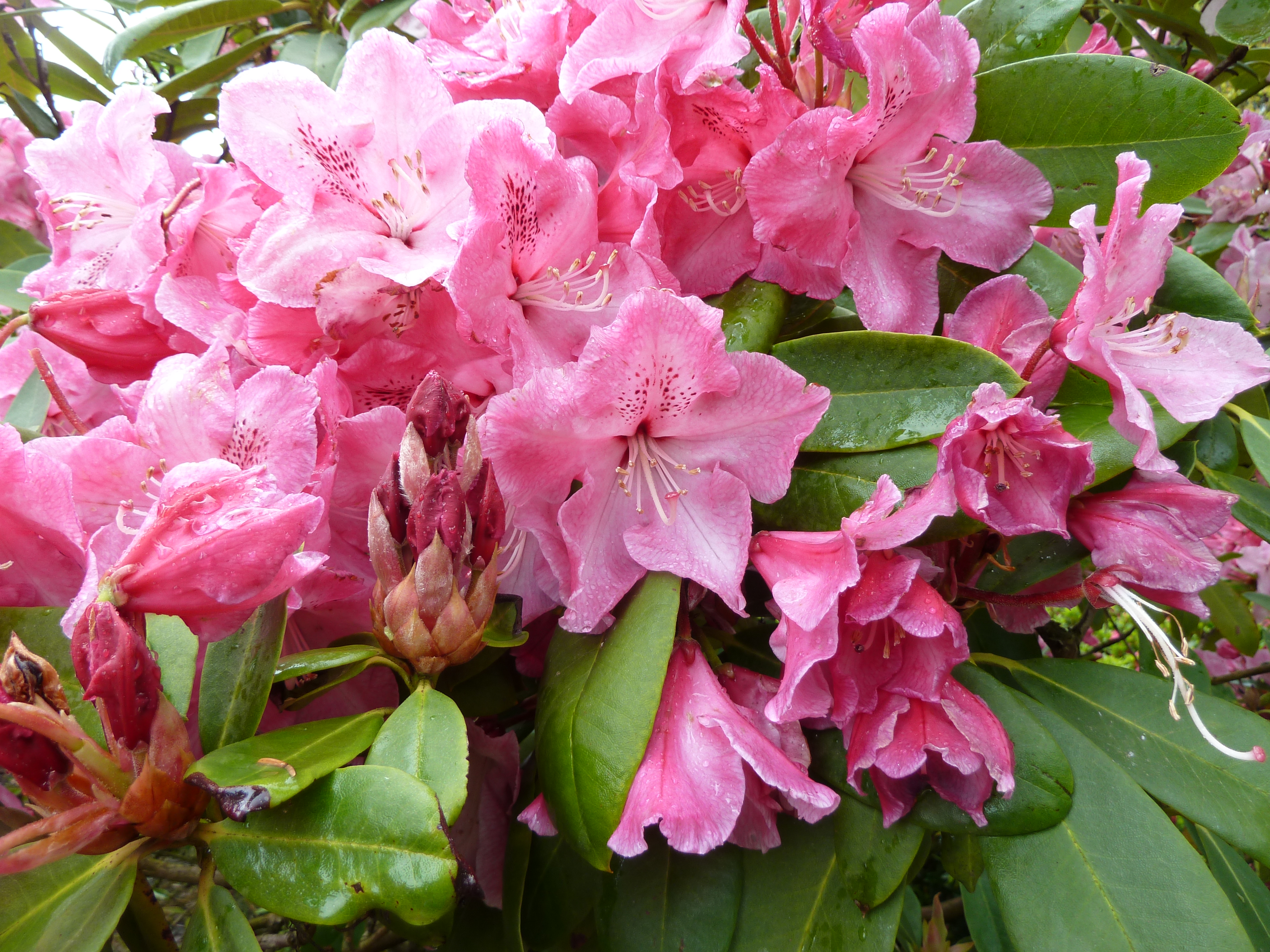

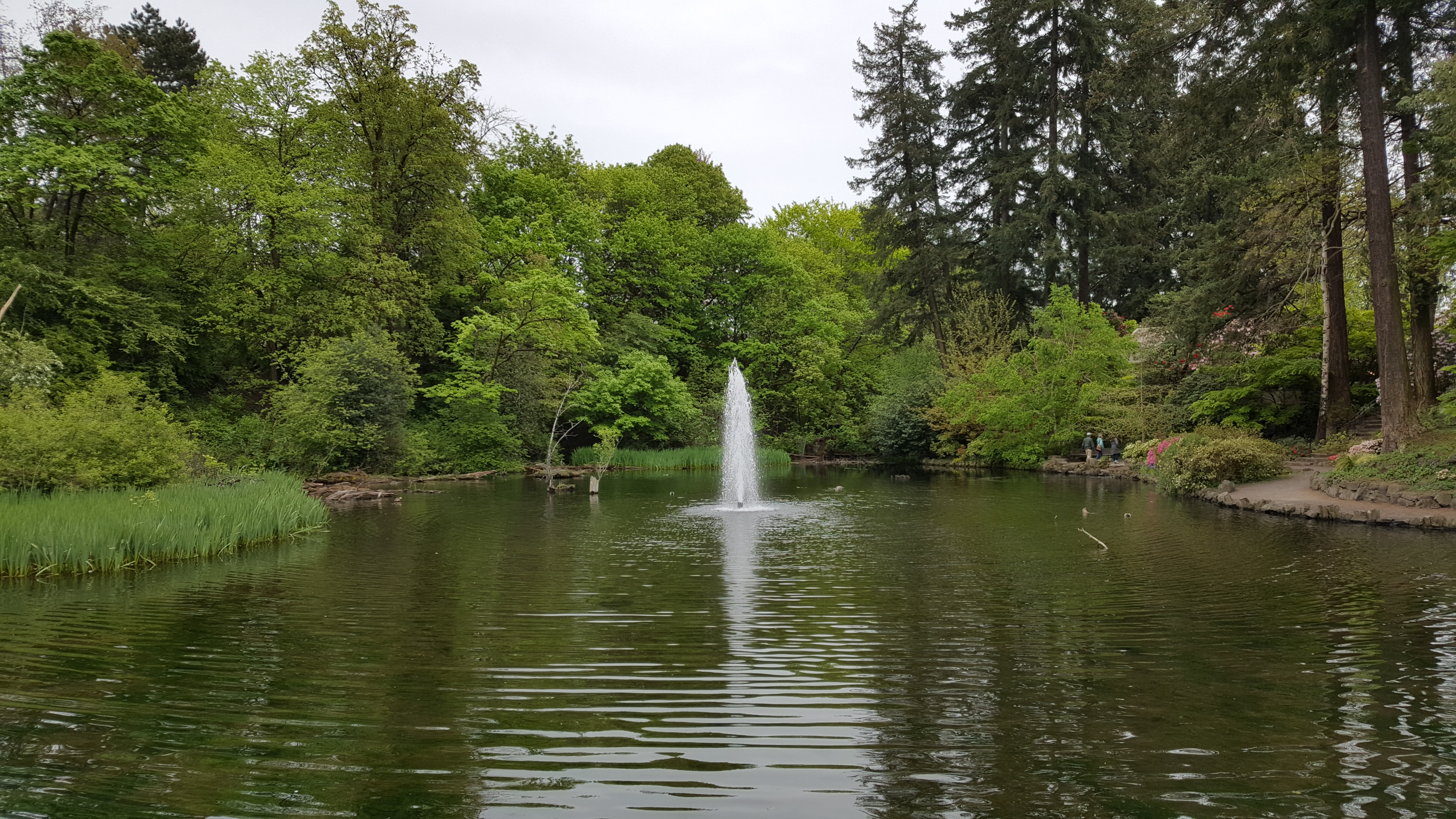

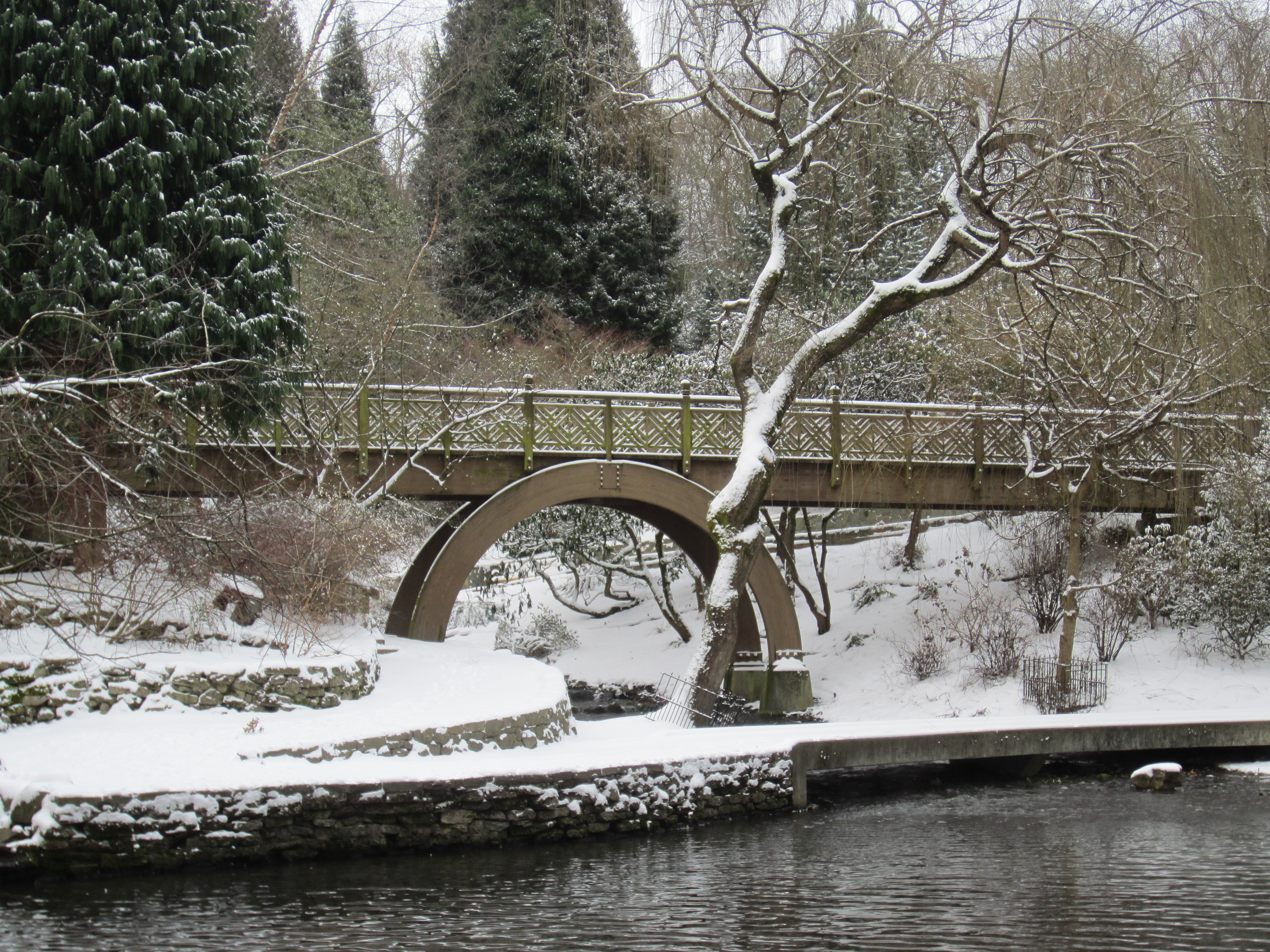

== See also ==
- List of botanical gardens in the United States
