= Westmoreland, Portland, Oregon =

District in Sellwood-Moreland, Portland, Oregon, U.S.

Coordinates: 45.47°N 122.64°W

Westmoreland is one of two distinct districts making up the Sellwood-Moreland neighborhood of Southeast Portland, bordering Brooklyn to the north, the Willamette River to the west, Eastmoreland to the east, and Sellwood to the south. The isolation caused by being bounded on two sides by the river and Oregon Route 99E (a major artery) have produced a distinct small-town atmosphere, despite its being relatively close to downtown Portland.

Westmoreland was named for a local real estate developer, Judge J.C. Moreland. The district includes Westmoreland Park.
