= Eastmoreland, Portland, Oregon =

Eastmoreland
- Neighborhood
- Interactive map of Eastmoreland
- Coordinates: 45°28′34″N 122°37′55″W
- Country: United States
- State: Oregon
- City: Portland

Government
  - Association: Eastmoreland Neighborhood Association
  - Coalition: District Four Coalition

Area
  - Total: 1.14 sq mi (2.95 km^{2})

Population (2000)
  - Total: 5,017
  - Density: 4,400/sq mi (1,700/km^{2})

Housing
  - No. of households: 1630
  - Occupancy rate: 96% occupied
  - Owner-occupied: 1459 households (90%)
  - Renting: 171 households (10%)
  - Avg. household size: 3.08 persons
- ISO 3166 code
- Eastmoreland Historic District
- U.S. National Register of Historic Places
- U.S. Historic district
- Location: Southeast Portland
- Area: 475 acres (192 ha)
- Built: 1910–1961
- MPS: Historic Residential Suburbs in the United States, 1830–1960
- NRHP reference No.: 100008367
- Added to NRHP: December 7, 2022

Eastmoreland is a residential neighborhood consisting almost entirely of single family homes in inner southeast Portland, Oregon, United States. Eastmoreland was named for a local real estate developer, Judge J.C. Moreland. A portion of the neighborhood was listed on the National Register of Historic Places in December 2022.

== Description ==
The neighborhood is bounded on the north by SE Woodstock Boulevard. The western boundary is a combination of SE McLoughlin Boulevard, SE Reedway Street, and SE 26th Avenue. Johnson Creek serves as most of the neighborhood's southern boundary, which meets its eastern boundary between SE Tenino Street and SE Crystal Springs Boulevard., SE César E. Chávez Boulevard. Its northern border winds around the Reed College campus and continues on SE Steele Street until meeting its western boundary.

Eastmoreland is filled with trees and lush landscaping. Public parks in Eastmoreland include Crystal Springs Rhododendron Garden (1923), Eastmoreland Golf Course (1916), Eastmoreland Garden (2004), Eastmoreland Playground Park (1916), and Berkeley Park (1941). There is also a median on Reed College Place which is owned by Portland Department of Transportation and maintained by Portland Parks & Recreation. The Shakespeare Garden at Eastmoreland was designed by Florence Holmes Gerke.

Eastmoreland is home to two schools, Duniway Elementary School (constructed in 1926 and named for Abigail Scott Duniway) and Holy Family Catholic School.

In 2024, Eastmoreland became a part of Portland's District 4.

== Historic district ==
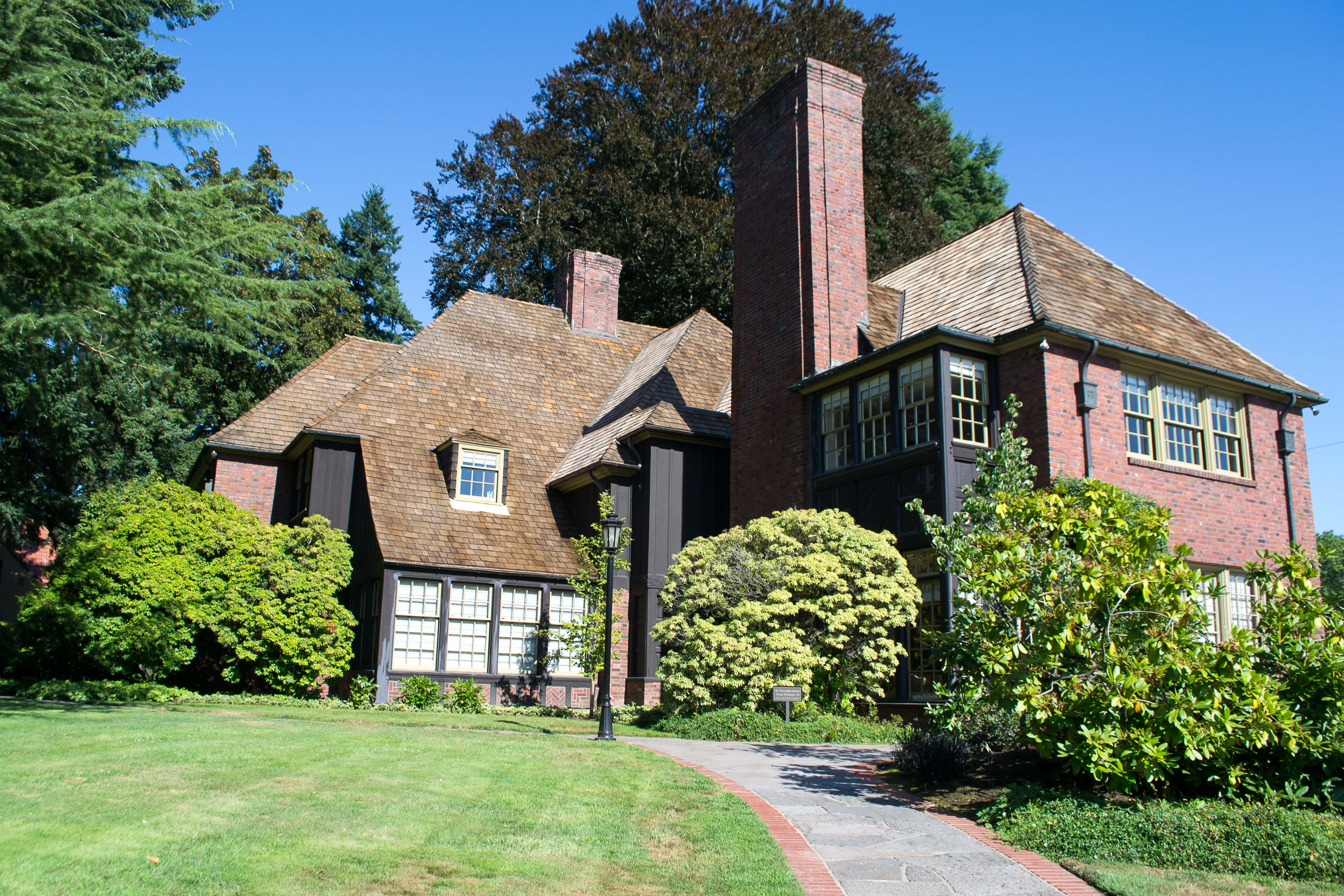
The Parker House, pictured in 2013, is part of Reed College and located within the historic district's boundaries, just south of Woodstock Boulevard.

In 2017, a proposed Eastermoreland Historic District encompassed approximately 475 acres within southeast Portland's Eastmoreland neighborhood, and was generally bounded by Woodstock Boulevard on the north, Cesar Chavez Boulevard and 36th Avenue on the east, Berkeley Park and Crystal Springs Boulevard on the south, and 27th and 28th Avenues on the west.

The proposed historic district was nominated by the Eastmoreland Neighborhood Association in an attempt to reduce the number of home demolitions and renovations. The bid has been contentious, as historic designation would prevent owners from being able to expand or update houses.

In February 2017, the Portland Historic Landmarks Commission endorsed the association's nomination for historic status. One week later, the nine-person State Advisory Committee on Historic Preservation unanimously endorsed the proposal, putting the district on "clear path toward the register". Historic status may be blocked if dissenting owners submit enough notarized objections by July 1. As of February 17, 675 of the more than 1,000 required objections had been received.

In April 2018, four separate home owners split their property ownership among hundreds of trusts; these owners filed more than 5,000 formal objections to the historic district proposal, possibly blocking the nomination using a technical tactic. 952 additional objections were submitted by owners not associated with the hundreds of trusts. According to The Oregonian, "Without the trusts, the number of objections appears to have fallen short of a majority". The neighborhood association's president described the maneuver as "undemocratic" and said, "If this was an election, it would be called voter fraud." The Oregon State Historic Preservation Office said, "According to federal rules, if more than 50% of the owners in a district submit objections, the property cannot be listed."

Trust owners' being counted as eligible owners was challenged in court and a new rule for counting objections was established in 2022. A new application was submitted to the National Park Service. The Eastmoreland Historic District was added to the National Register on December 7, 2022.

== See also ==
- National Register of Historic Places in Southeast Portland, Oregon
