= Berkeley Park (Portland, Oregon) =

Public park in Portland, Oregon, U.S.

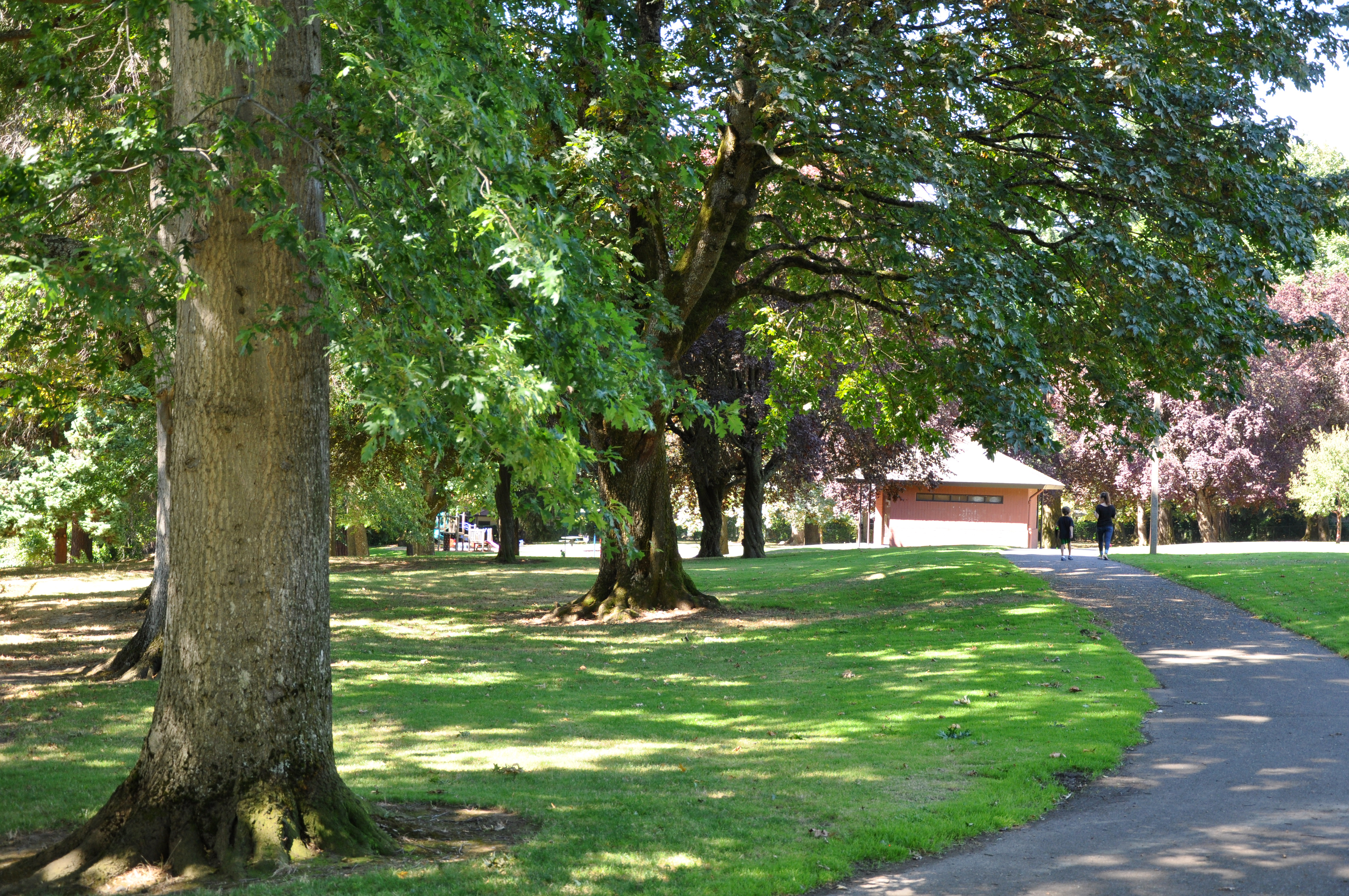
- The park in 2010

- Location within Portland, Oregon
- Location: SE Cesar Chavez Blvd. and Bybee Blvd. Portland, Oregon
- Coordinates: 45°28′23″N 122°37′27″W
- Area: 6.48 acres (2.62 ha)
- Operator: Portland Parks & Recreation
- Open: 5:00am – midnight

Berkeley Park is a 6.48-acre (2.62 ha) public park in Portland, Oregon, United States. Acquired in 1941, the park has a playground, fields for multiple sports, and tennis courts, among other features.

== Description ==
Berkeley Park is a 6.48-acre (2.62 ha) public park in southeast Portland's Eastmoreland neighborhood, with a main entrance at the intersection of Southeast Cesar Chavez Boulevard and Bybee Boulevard. The park has a playground, restroom facility, lighted tennis courts and fields for baseball, soccer, and softball, as well as paved paths, picnic tables, and an area designated for horseshoes. Berkeley Park is open daily from 5am to midnight. The park is part of the proposed Eastmoreland Historic District.

A pair of tennis courts dedicated as the Alex Rovello Memorial Courts in 2014 are located at the southeast corner of the park.

== History ==
The park was acquired in 1941.
