= Eastmoreland Golf Course =

Golf course in Portland, Oregon, U.S.

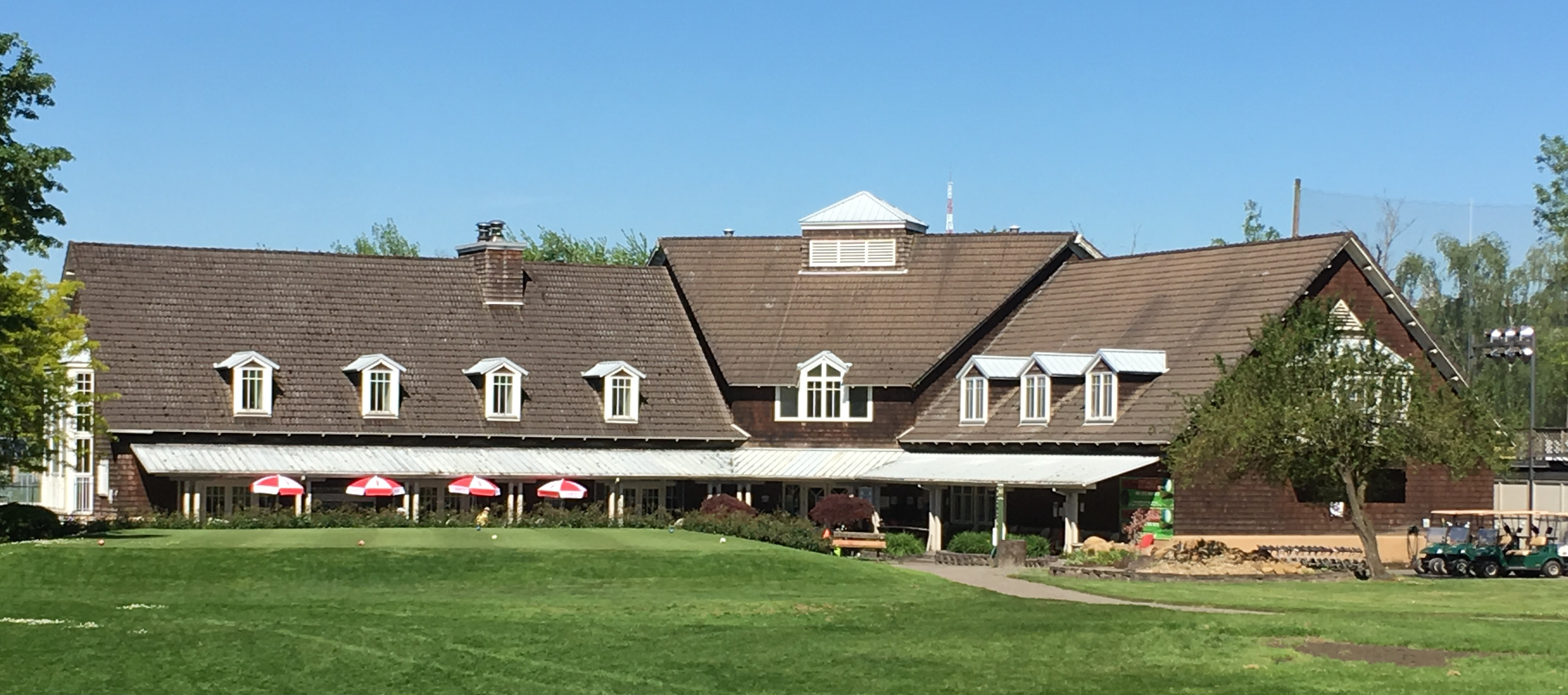
- The Eastmoreland Golf Clubhouse in 2017

- Location in Portland, Oregon
- 45.469°N 122.637°W

Club information
- Location: Portland, Oregon, U.S.
- Established: 1917
- Type: Public
- Website: eastmorelandgolfcourse.com
- Designed by: Chandler Egan

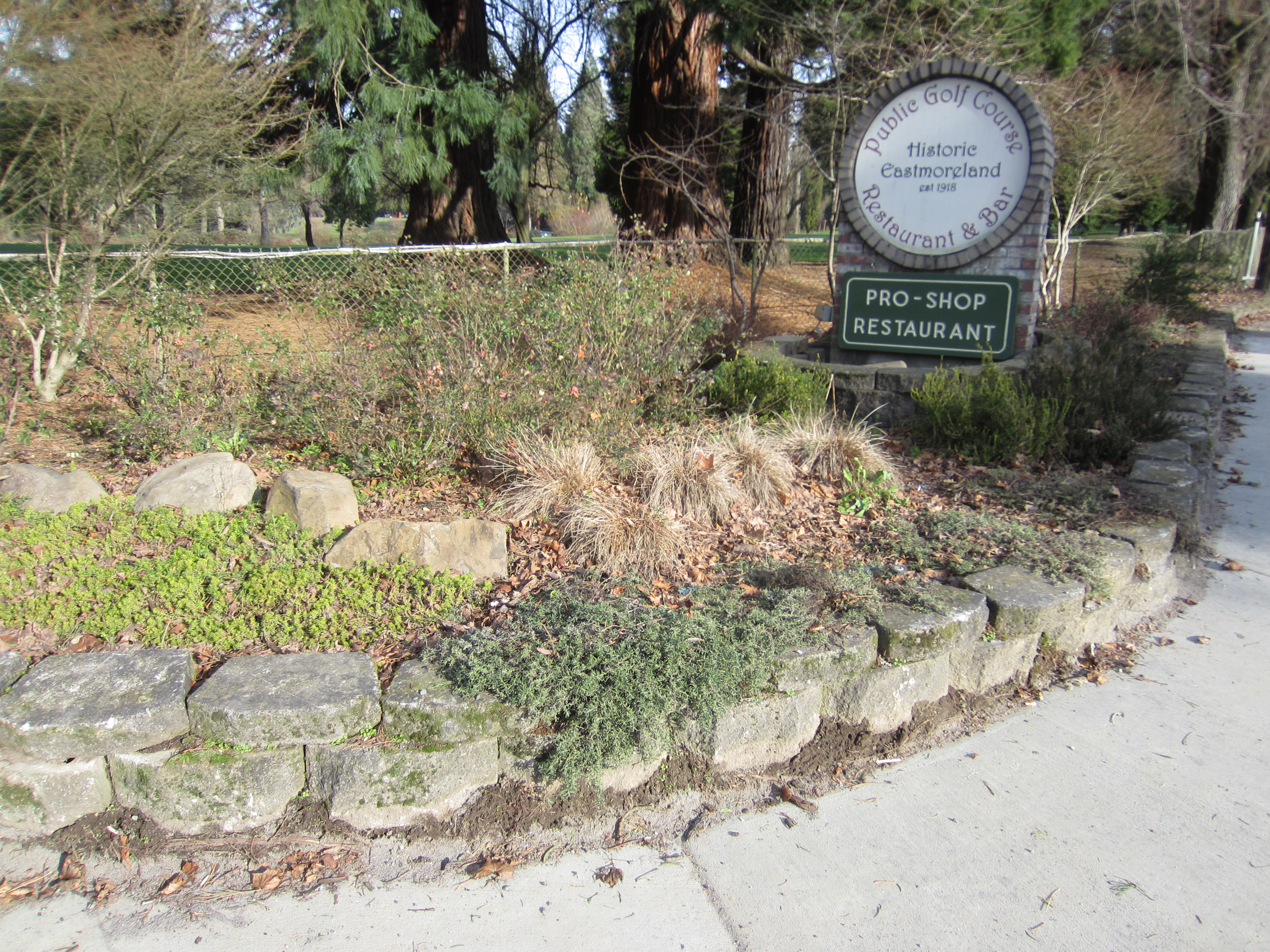
Sign for the restaurant, 2015

Eastmoreland Golf Course is a golf course in southeast Portland, Oregon. Designed by golf architect Chandler Egan, the course is the second oldest in Oregon, established in 1917, and was ranked among the top 25 public golf courses in the United States by Golf Digest in the early 1990s. It hosted the U.S. Amateur Public Links in 1933 and 1990.

== Reception ==
Eastmoreland Golf Course placed second in the Best Golf Course category of Willamette Week's annual 'Best of Portland' readers' poll in 2025.
