= California Skateparks =

US skate park and action sports facility builder and designer

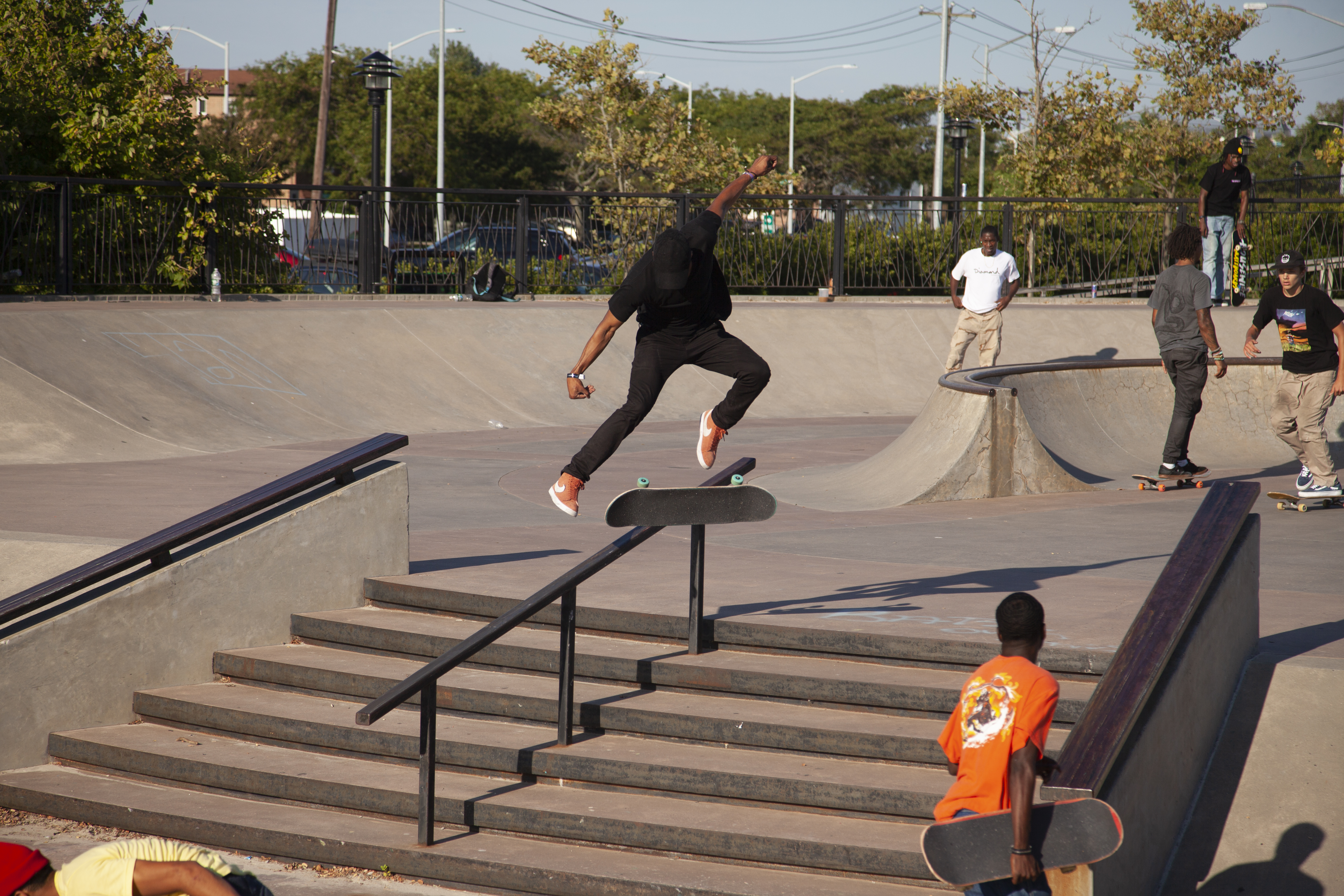
Far Rockaway Skate Park built by California Skateparks in 2010

California Skateparks (or CA Skateparks) is a skate park and action sports facility builder and designer. Founded in 1989 and based in Upland, California, CA Skateparks has constructed municipal city and county parks, action sports competition arenas, and professional athlete's private facilities. CA Skateparks is part of a larger group of companies, including California Landscape & Design Inc. and CA Ramp Works, all owned by founder Joe Ciaglia Jr. California Skateparks designed and built Rob Dyrdek's Fantasy Factory, which has appeared in the MTV show Rob Dyrdek's Fantasy Factory. The company also designed the Vans skatepark in Huntington Beach, California.
