= SITE Design Group =

- Industry: Urban planning skateparks
- Website: sitedesigngroup.com

SITE Design Group is a consulting firm specializing in landscape architecture, urban planning and skateparks. Based in Solana Beach, California, the firm operates worldwide and has overseen the creation of over 100 parks.

== Work ==
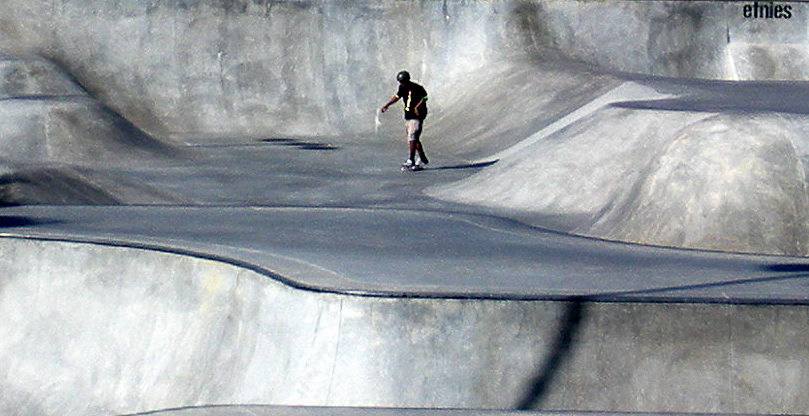
Etnies Skatepark of Lake Forest.

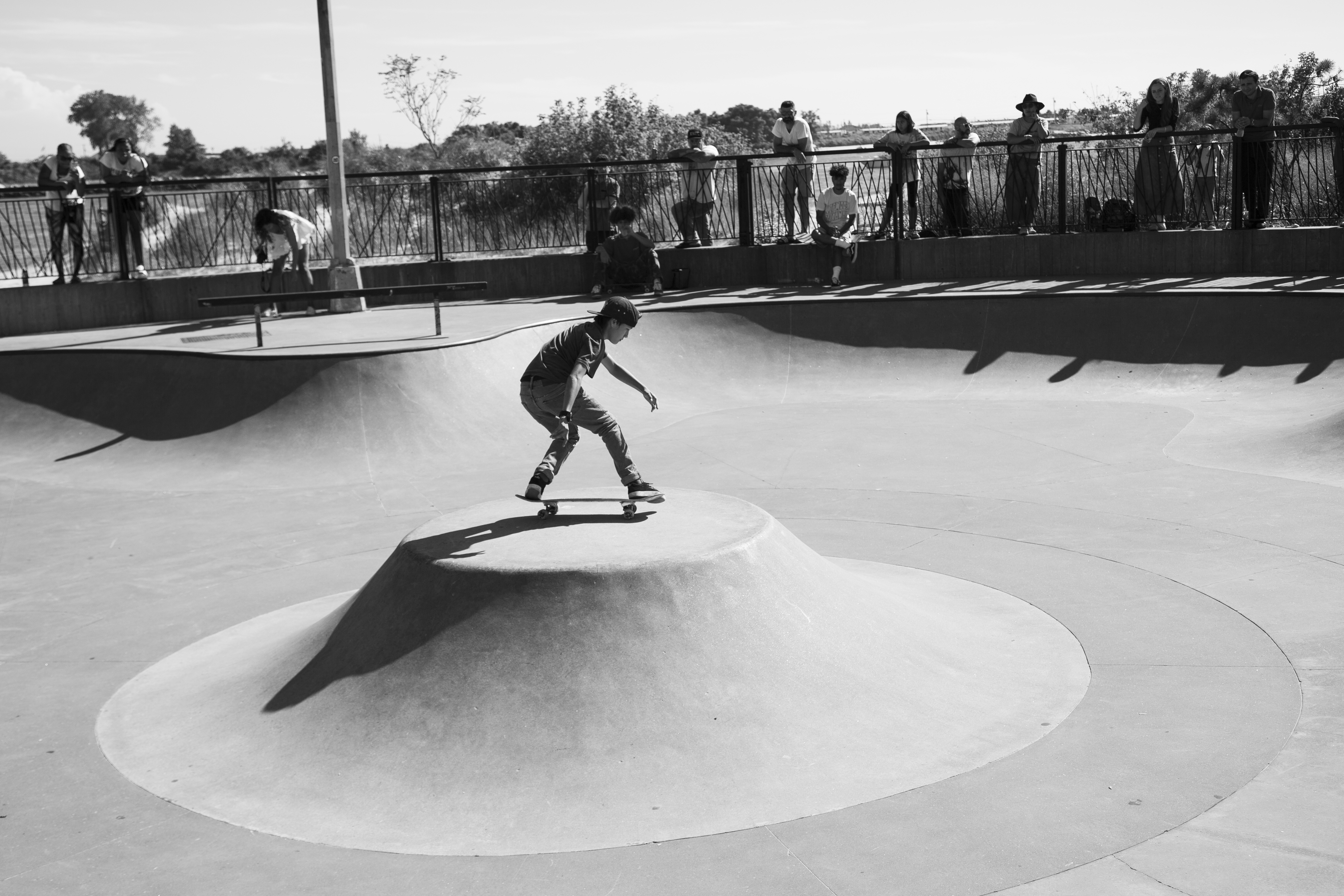
Jiro Platt - Far Rockaway Skatepark.

- Etnies Skatepark of Lake Forest
- Mat Hoffman Action Sports Park of Oklahoma City with BMX professional Mat Hoffman
- Backyard skatepark for professional skateboarder Tony Hawk
- Far Rockaway Skatepark
- Vans' Off the Wall Skatepark in Huntington Beach, California
- Linda Vista Skatepark in San Diego
- Chandler Park Skatepark in Detroit
- Pier 62 Skate Park in Hudson River Park, New York

== See also ==
- List of skateparks
- Grindline Skateparks
