= Etnies Skatepark of Lake Forest =

Skatepark in Lake Forest, California

etnies Skatepark of Lake Forest
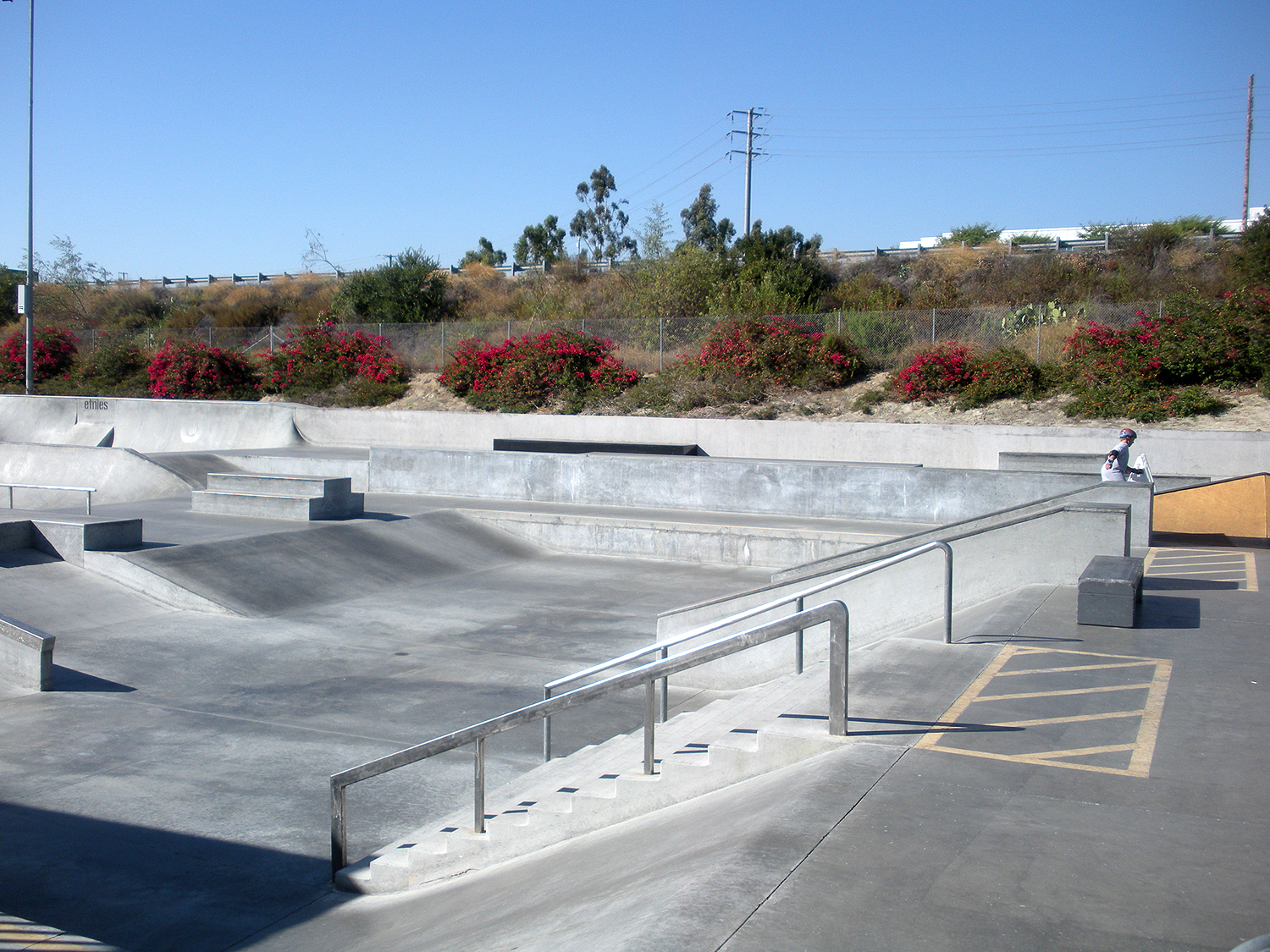
- The Street Course, a part of the skatepark

- Location within southern California
- Type: Skatepark
- Location: 20028 Lake Forest Drive; Lake Forest, California, U.S.
- Coordinates: 33°40′14″N 117°39′36″W
- Area: 62,000 ft^{2} (5,800 m^{2})
- Established: 2003
- Operator: City of Lake Forest

Etnies Skatepark of Lake Forest (stylized as etnies Skatepark) is a public skatepark located in Lake Forest, California, United States. It is the largest free skatepark in the state, with an area of over 62,000 square feet (5,800 m^{2}). The skatepark is owned and operated by the City of Lake Forest. The skatepark provides free identification cards for residents of Lake Forest and Foothill Ranch, while a $15 fee is required for non-residents in exchange for the identification card. Helmets, knee and elbow pads are required for all users. Spectators, with the exception of permitted photographers, are not allowed inside the park.

== History ==
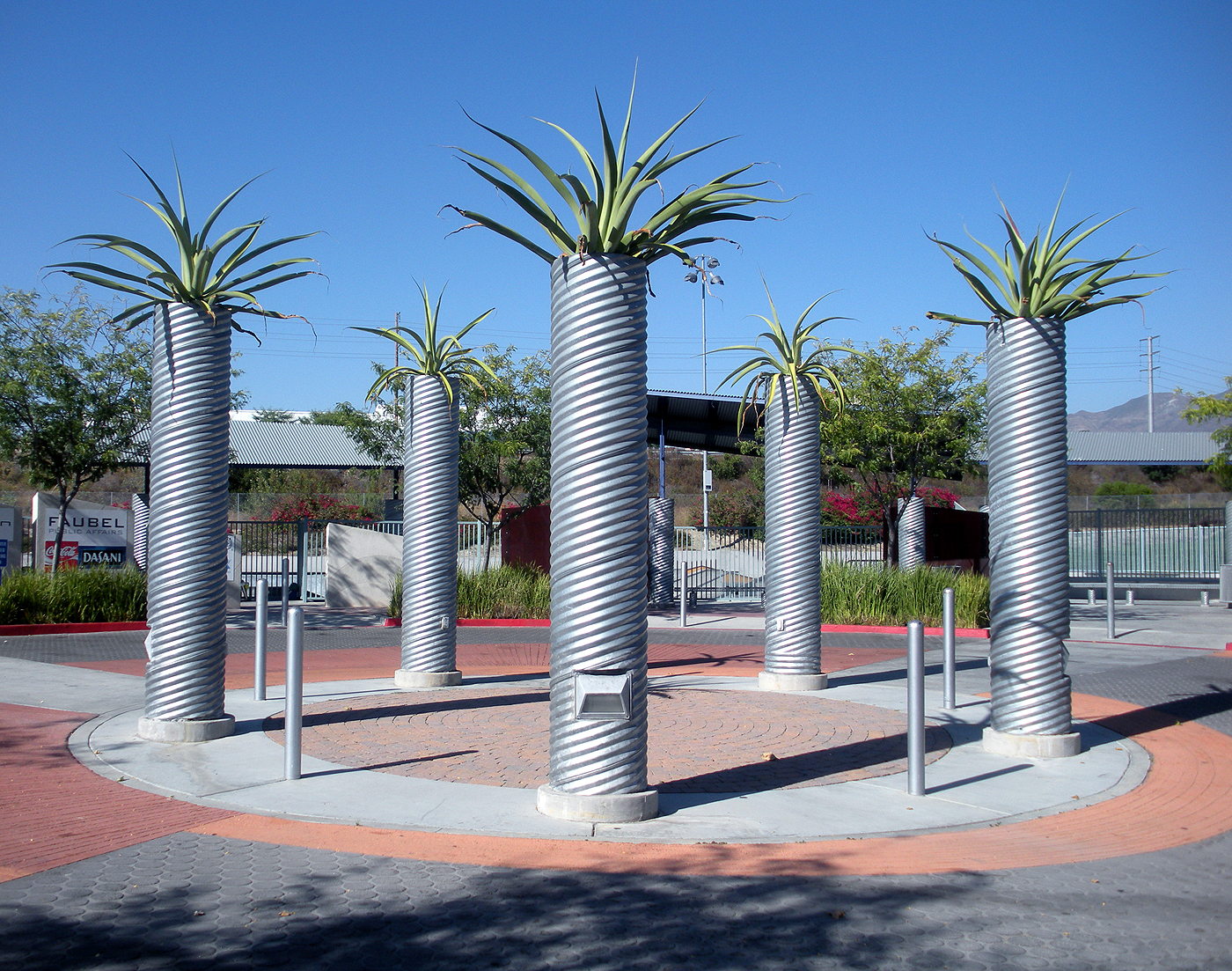
Circular drop-off area at the entrance of the park

etnies Skatepark of Lake Forest opened on December 13, 2003. The skatepark is a joint venture between the city of Lake Forest and etnies. The park was designed by SITE Design Group, a consulting firm specializing in urban design. In 2009 it was announced that an expansion would be made to the skatepark to increase the size by roughly 25,000 square feet (2,300 m^{2}), making it one of the largest skateparks in the country and the largest in California. The expansion's estimated cost was $632,500 and was expected to be completed by January 2011. The newly expanded park was marked by a ceremony on August 20, 2011, several months behind the expected date.

In August 2010, OC Parenting Magazine named Etnies the best skatepark of the year, its fourth consecutive win.

== Events ==
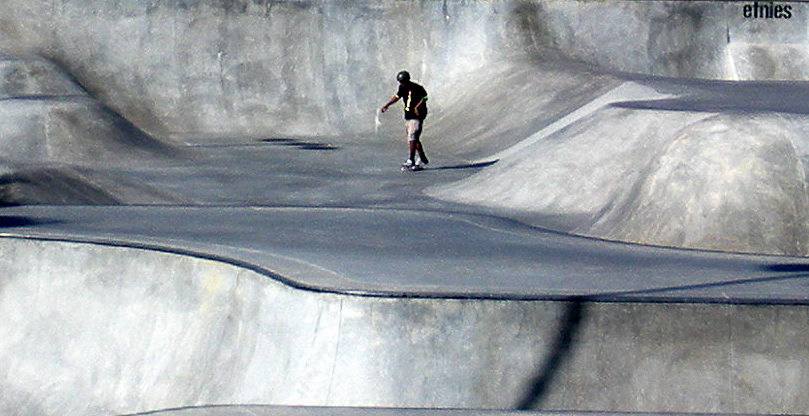
Skateboarder rides the Flow Course

Events at the skatepark include summer camps, movie screenings, film camps, skateboard camps, overnight camp outs, private lessons and skateboarding classes. The skatepark's programming, fundraising, events, and operations are managed by Scott Stewart. In May 2010, etnies Skatepark of Lake Forest, along with professional skateboarder Ryan Sheckler, hosted a contest in which proceeds went to benefit the Make-A-Wish Foundation. In July 2010, the park hosted the 6th annual Riverbed Cleanup and Environmental Awareness event, resulting in the removal of 1,500 pounds (680 kg) of debris, including trash and dirt, from nearby Whiting Ranch Wilderness Park and California State Route 241. Other participants included Home Depot and the Boy Scouts. The National Scholastic Skating League holds competitions at the park for middle school and high school skateboarding teams.
