= O'Donohue Park =

Public park in Queens, New York

- Interactive map of O'Donohue Park
- Type: Public Park
- Location: Far Rockaway, Queens
- Nearest city: New York City
- Coordinates: 40.5948°N 73.7481°W
- Created: New York City Department of Parks and Recreation
- Established: 2008
- Open: 6 a.m. to 9 p.m.

O'Donohue Park is a public green space located in the Far Rockaway neighborhood on the Rockaway Peninsula of Queens in New York City. The park is located at the eastern tip of the Rockaway Beach and Boardwalk.

Prior to its acquisition by the city, O’Donohue Park was a private community of summer homes and common space at the foot of Jarvis Lane, which later became Beach 9th Street. The land was purchased by Mary O'Donohue in 1868 and her heirs continued to develop the property as a summer beach destination. In 1925, developer Isaac Zaret purchased the property, naming it O'Donohue Park with the intention of building fifty homes on the site. The plan failed to materialize and by 1938, it had fallen into foreclosure. The city acquired it in 1942 and added another 14.5 acres (5.9 ha) to it in 1957, expanding the park westward towards Beach 17th Street.

In 1963, the NYC Parks Department constructed the current park at this location, extending the Rockaway Boardwalk from Beach 19th Street to Beach 9th Street. Instead of the traditional wood boardwalk, the new extension was made of concrete, at elevation 10. A public beach was included and fill provided to nourish the beach. Parking, a baseball field and substantial brick concession and bathroom were constructed at Beach 17th Street. A picnic area and handball courts were also built.

In 2012, O'Donohue Park was reconstructed in a project that transformed an underutilized 500-space parking lot into a lawn, Far Rockaway Skate Park, basketball courts, exercise equipment, and sitting area. At Beach 17th Street is a baseball field and lifeguard station, while at Beach 9th Street is a children's playground and 400-square-foot (37 m^{2}) comfort station. O’Donohue Park overlooks East Rockaway Inlet, an extension of Reynolds Channel connecting to the Atlantic Ocean.
