= Far Rockaway Skate Park =

Skatepark in Queens, New York

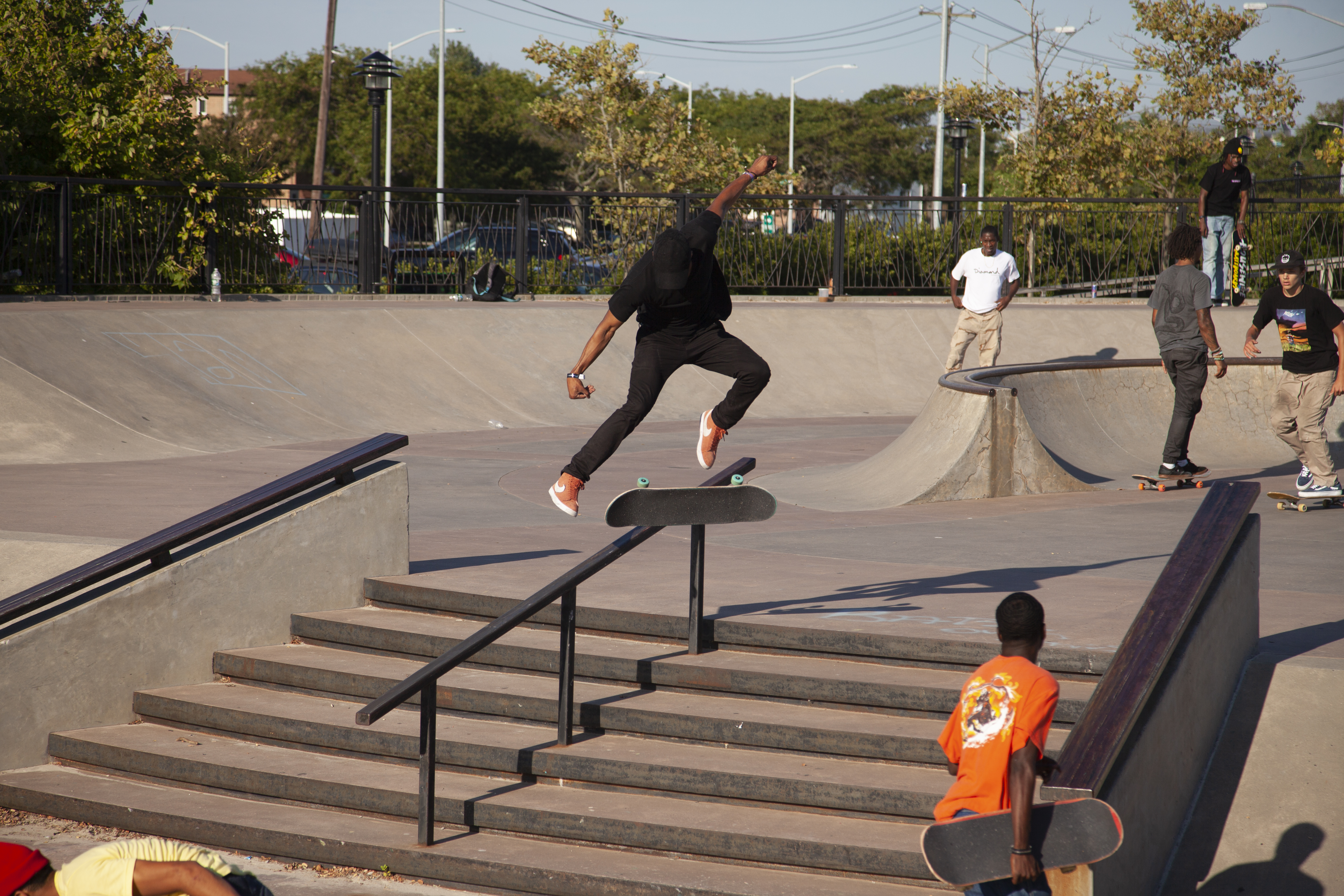
- Interactive map of Far Rockaway Skate Park
- Type: Skate park
- Location: Far Rockaway, Queens, New York
- Coordinates: 40.595319°N 73.746594°W
- Area: 15,700 square feet (1,460 m^{2})
- Created: 2010–2011
- Designer: SITE Design Group
- Owner: New York City Department of Parks and Recreation
- Open: All year
- Terrain: Concrete

Far Rockaway Skate Park is a public skate park on the Rockaway Beach and Boardwalk in Far Rockaway, Queens, New York City, opened in 2011. The park is open dawn till dusk and is unsupervised. In addition to skateboarding, scooters and inline skates are permitted. The park was built over a large parking lot that was reduced in size but not eliminated. The skatepark project was part of a larger renovation of O'Donohue Park that began in 2010 and was completed in 2011. The park was designed by SITE Design Group and built by California Skateparks.

== Gallery ==
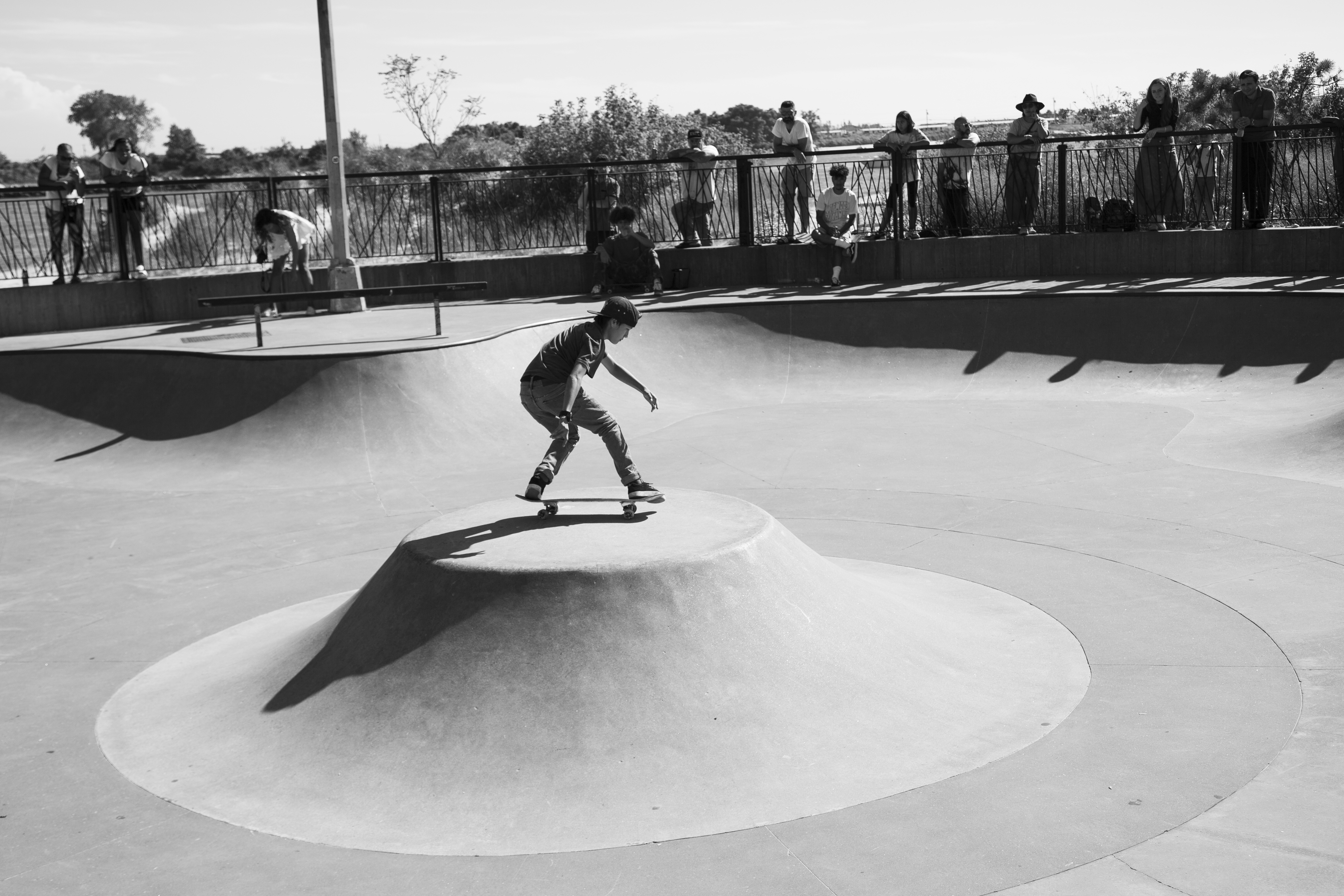

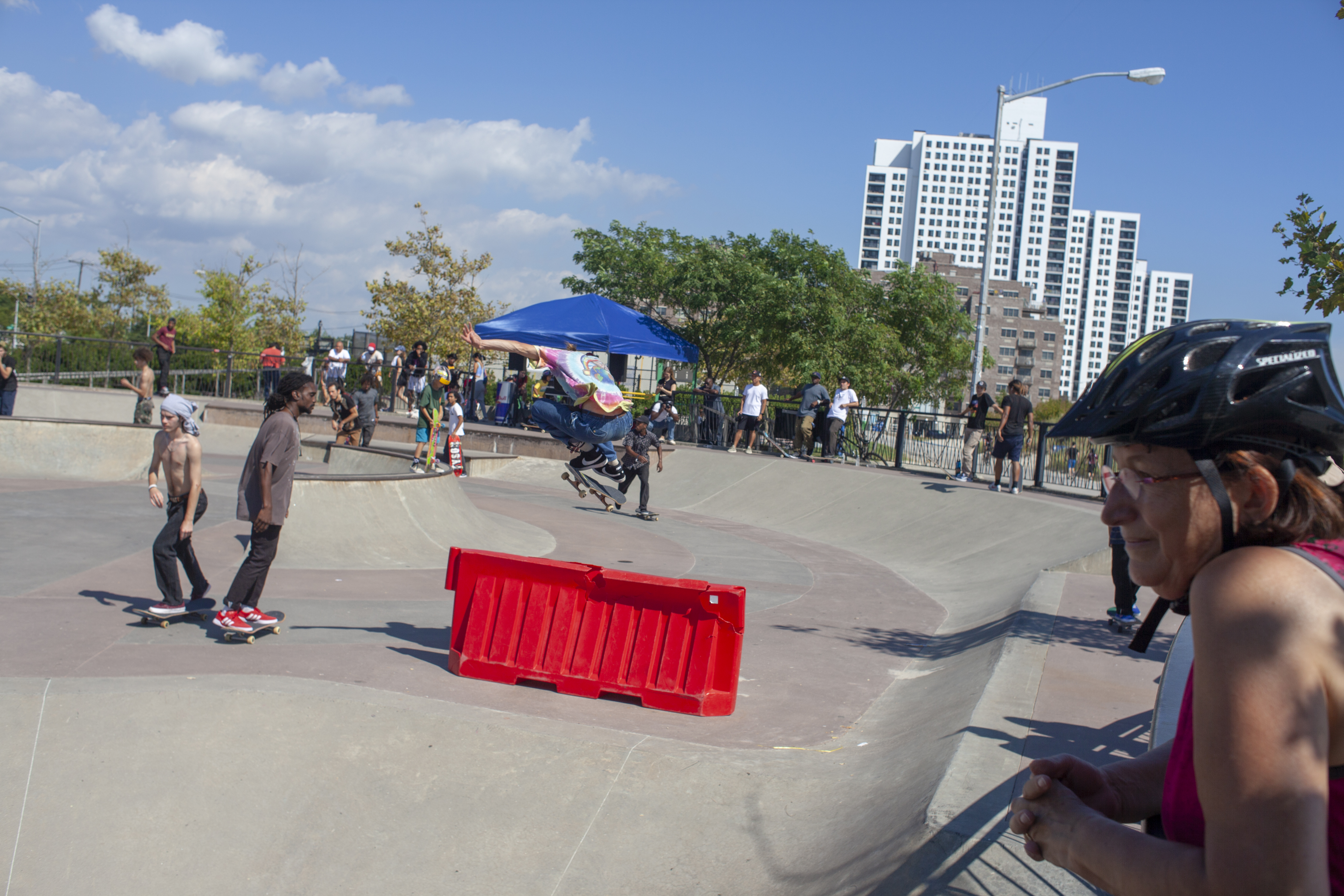

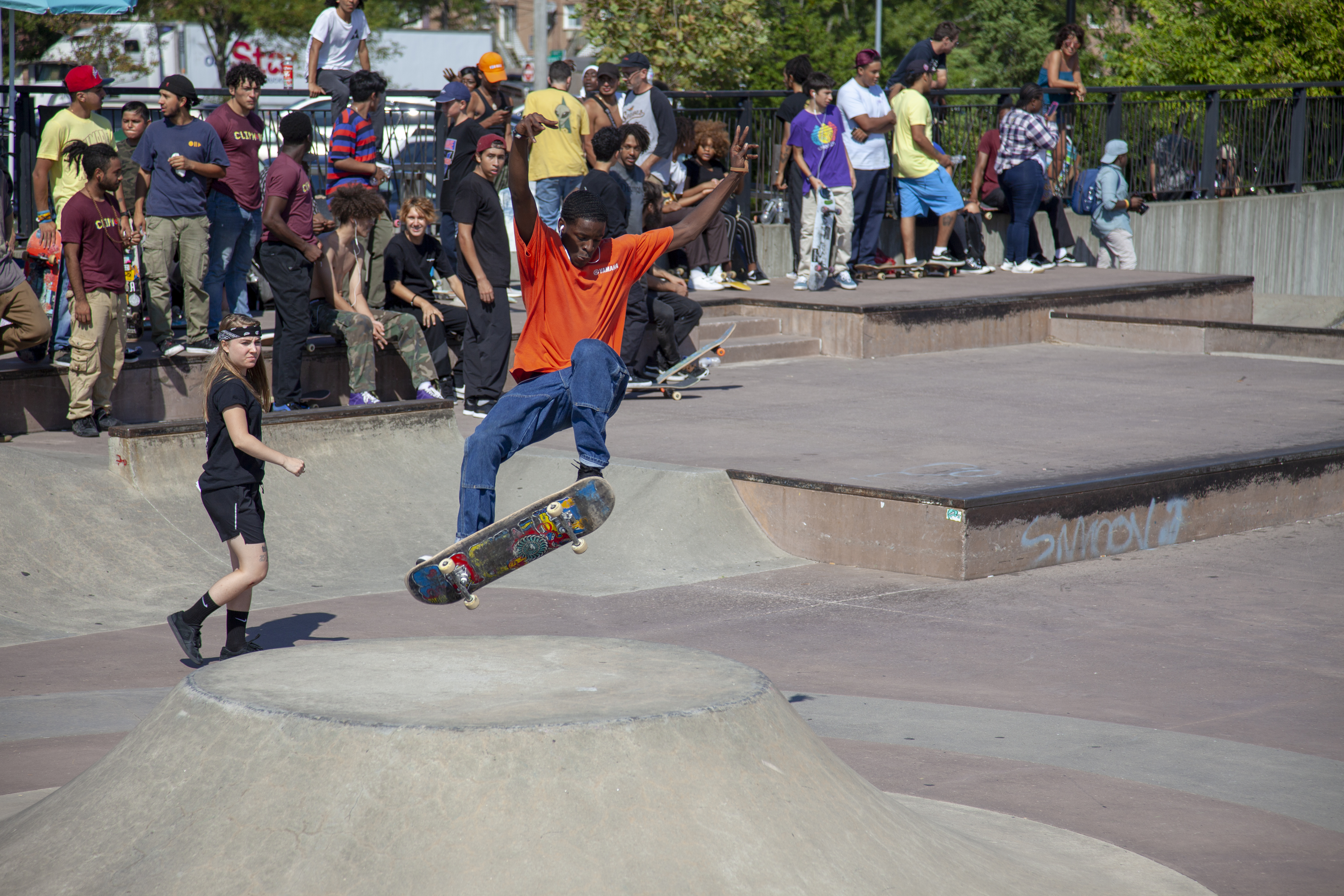

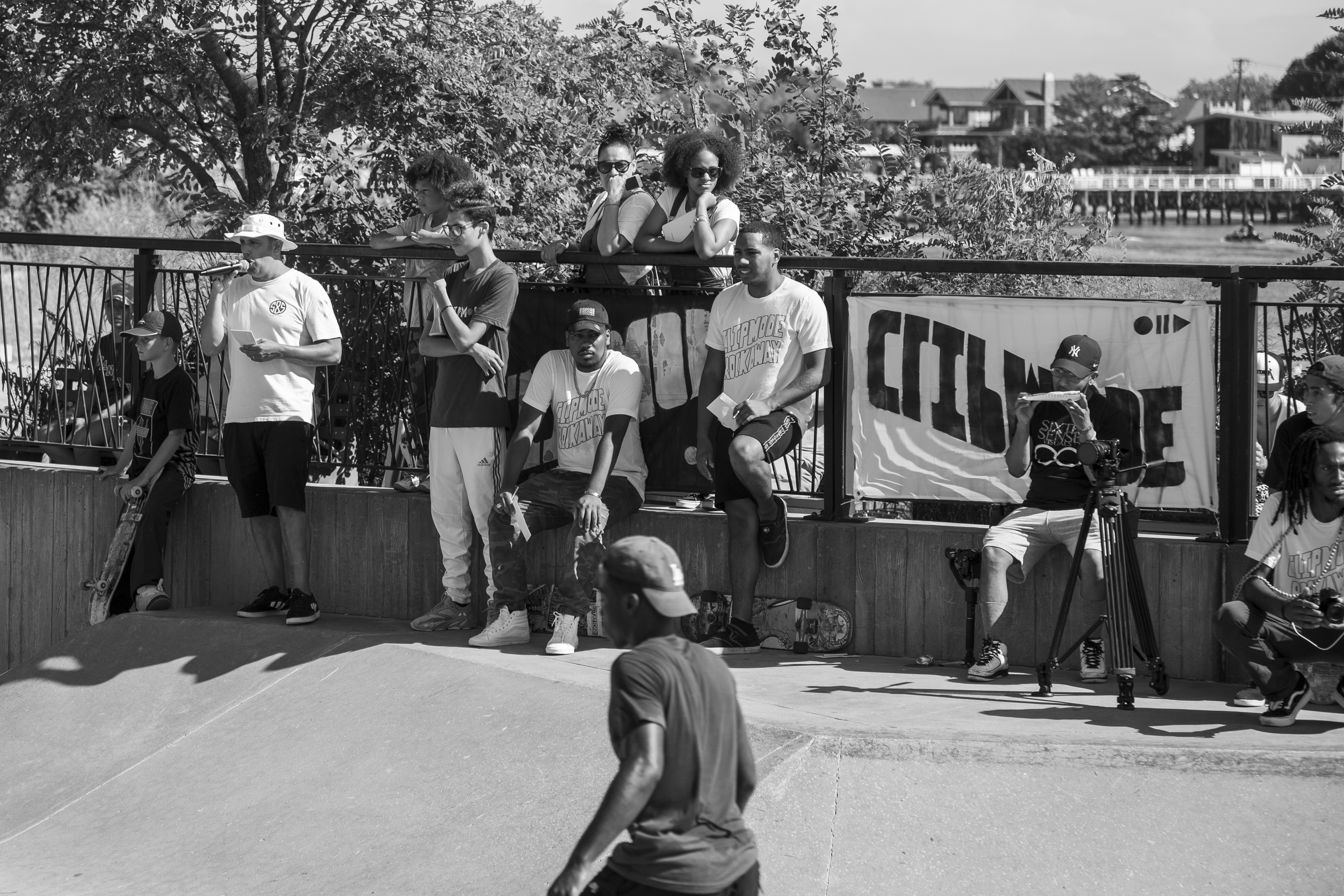

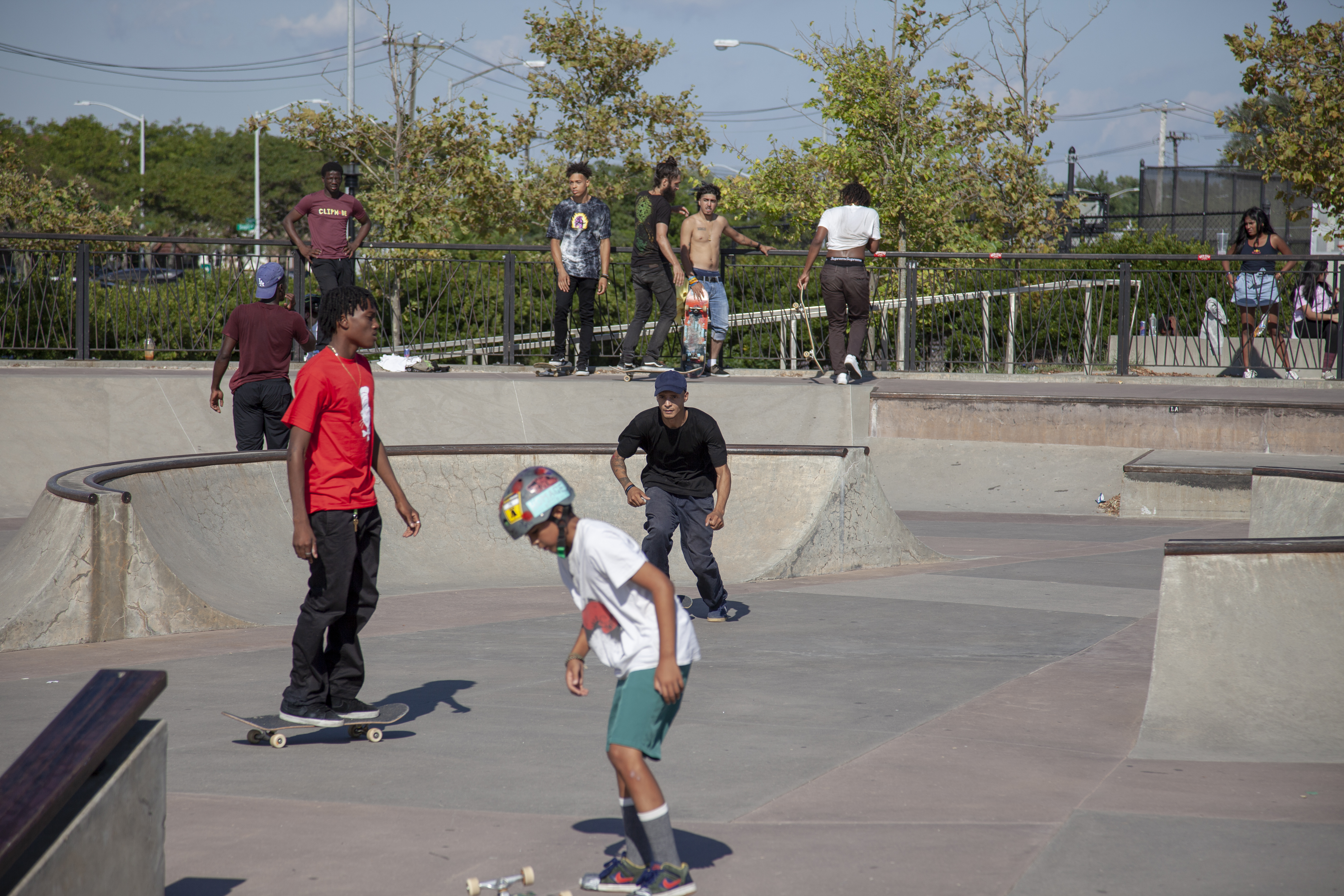

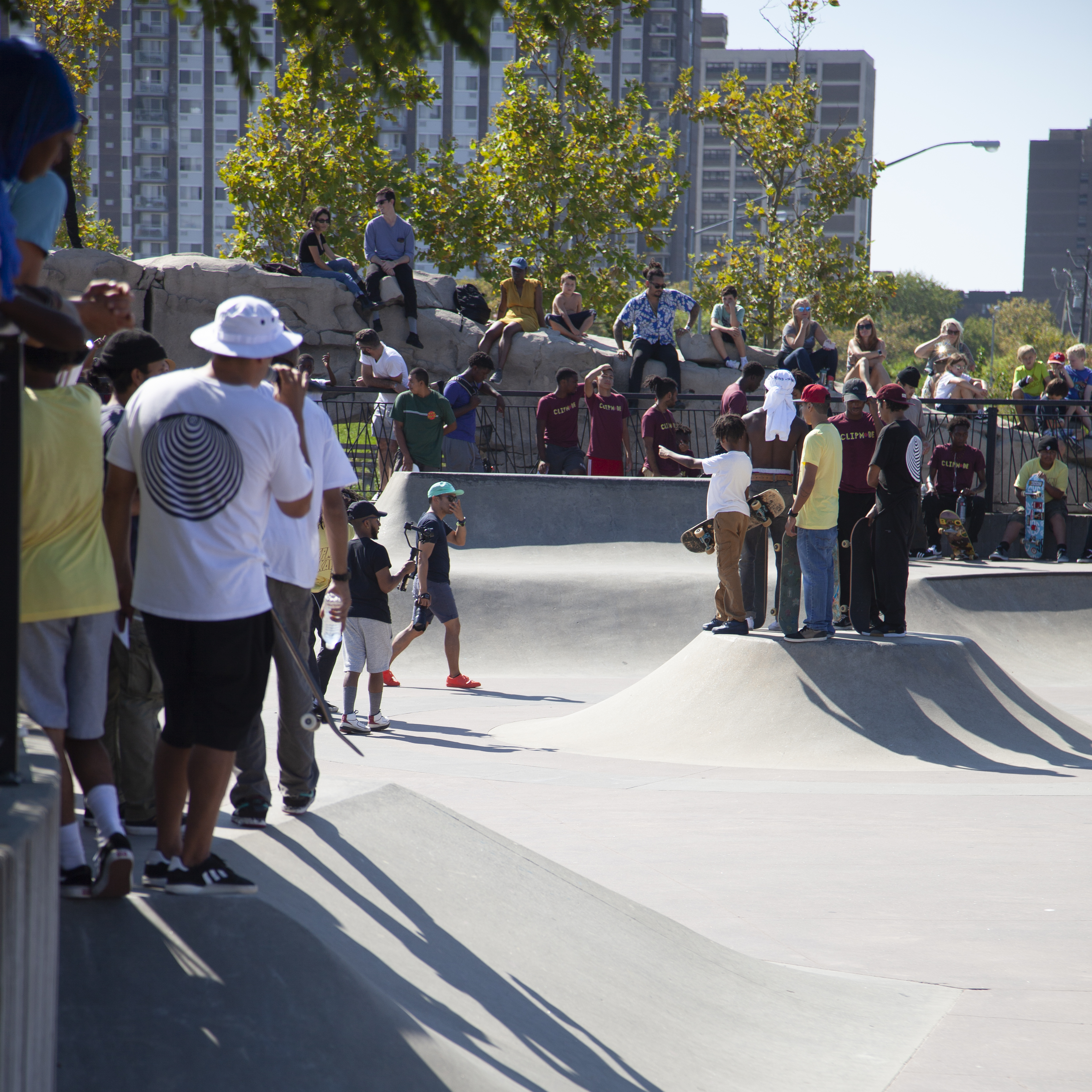

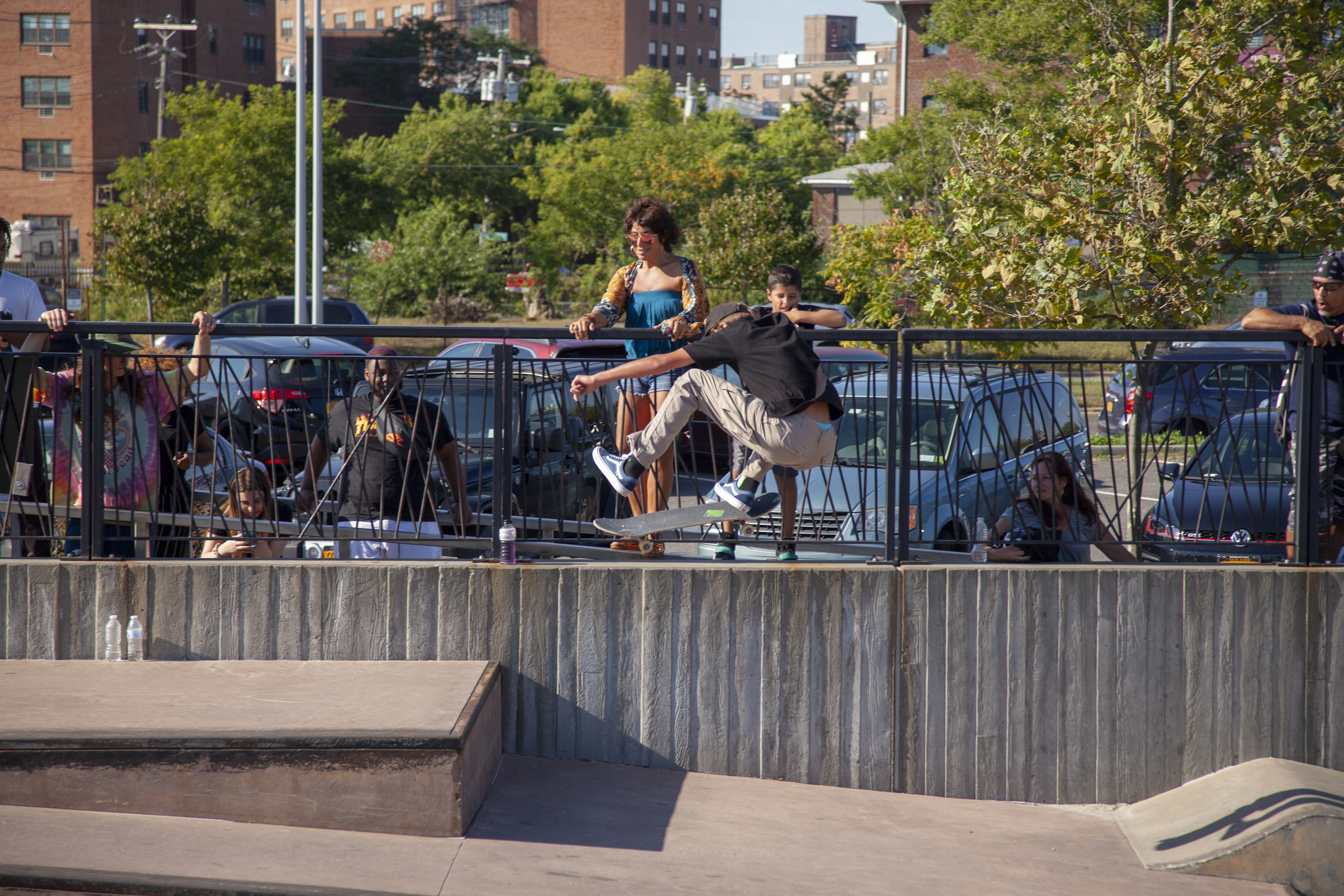

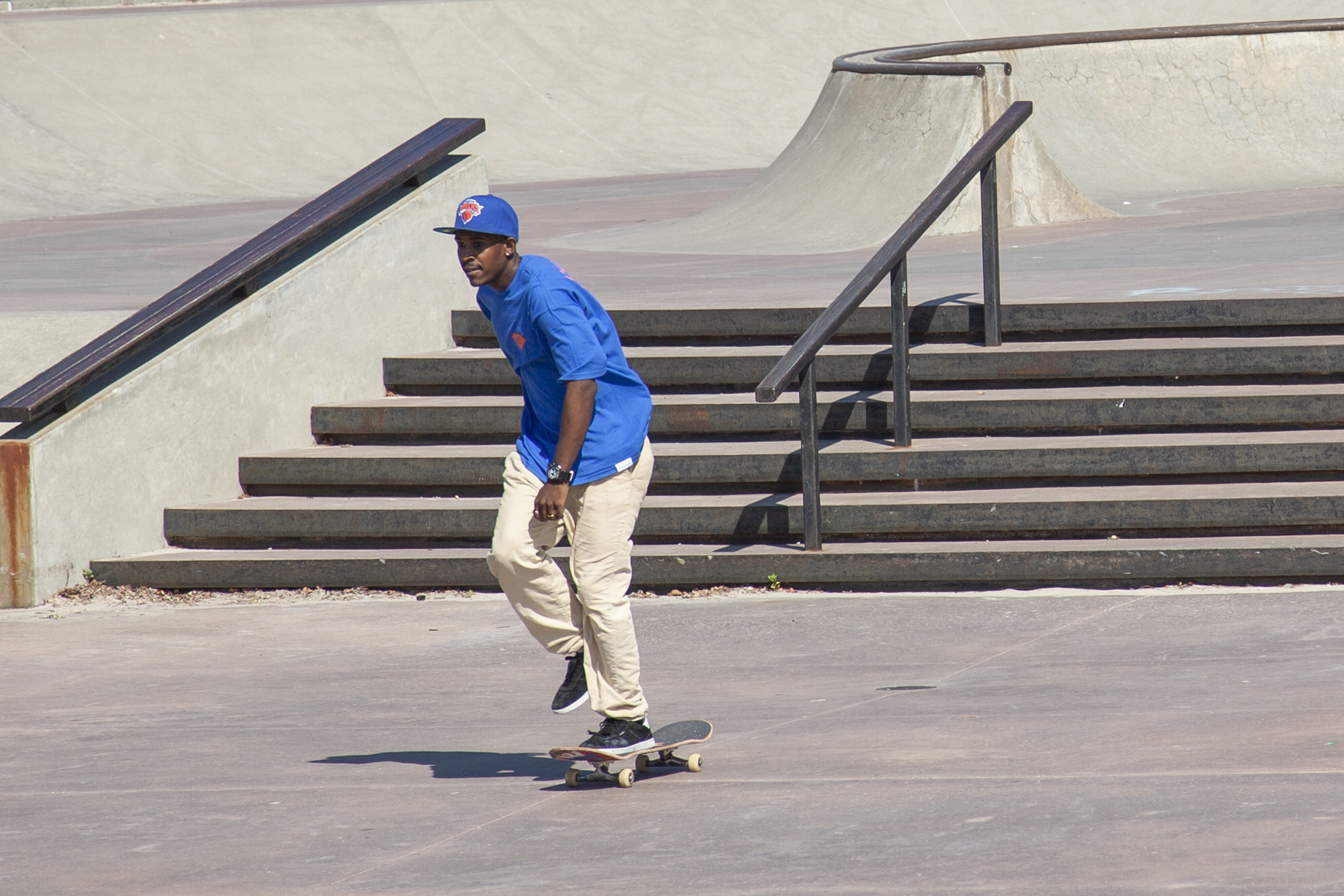

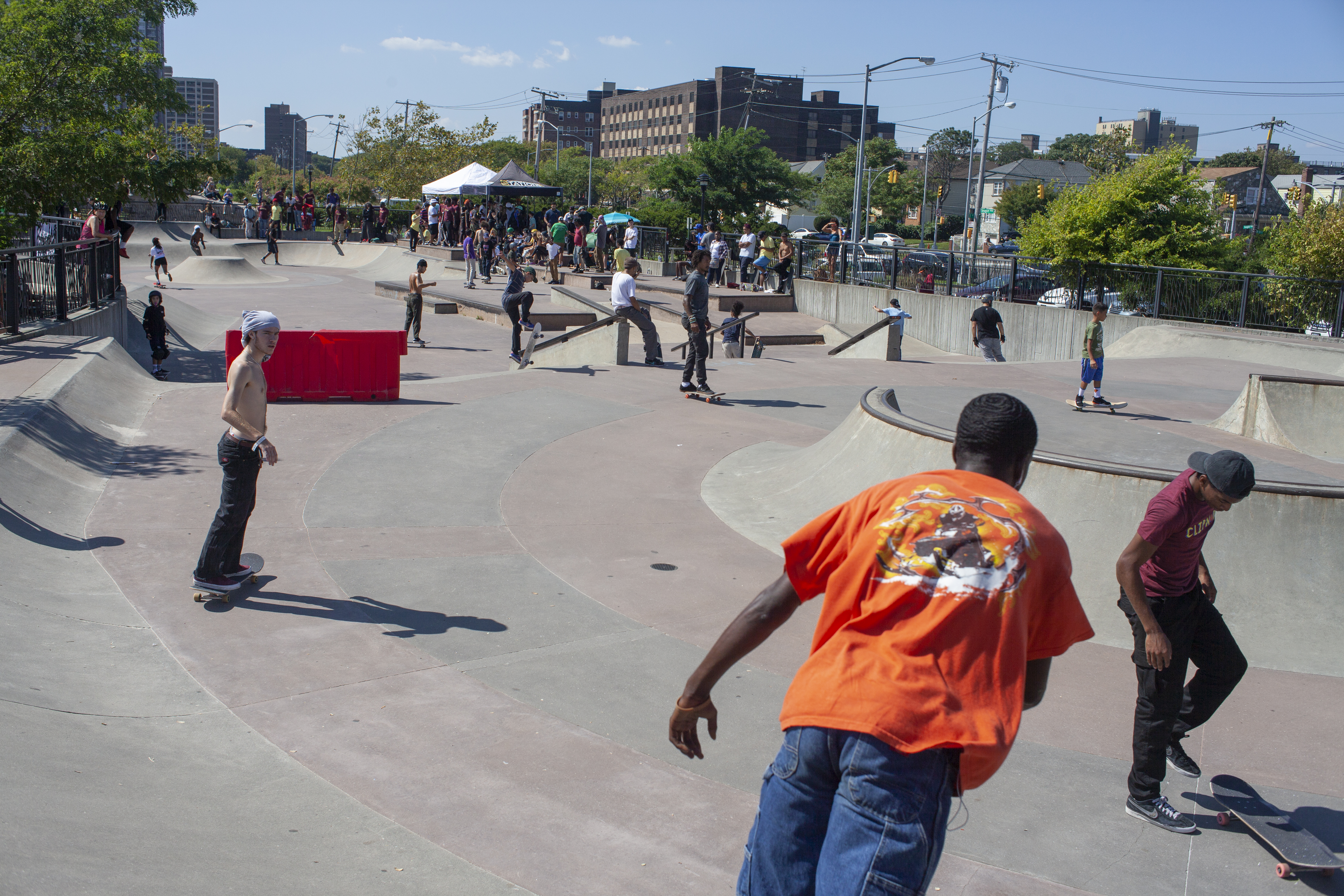

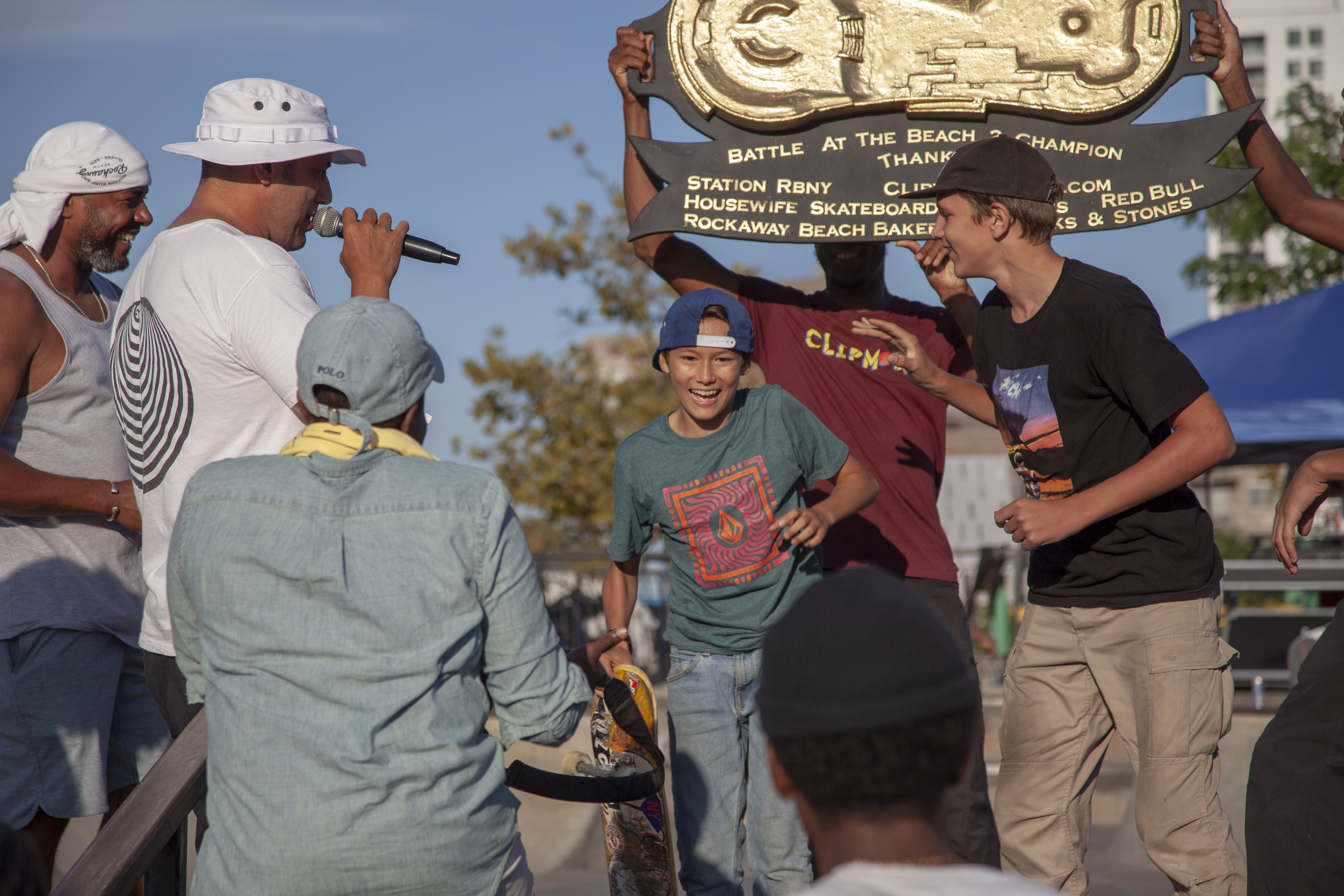

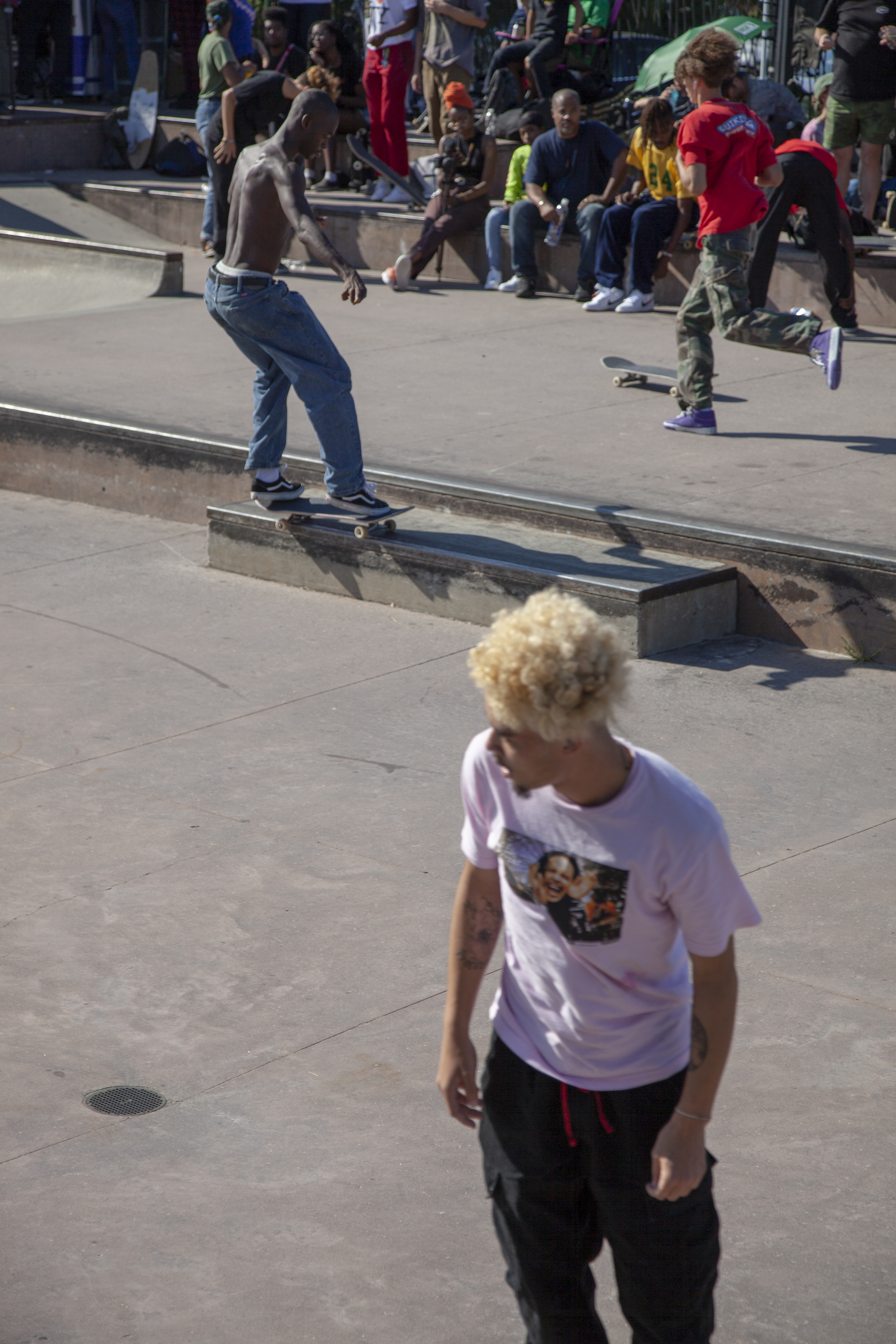

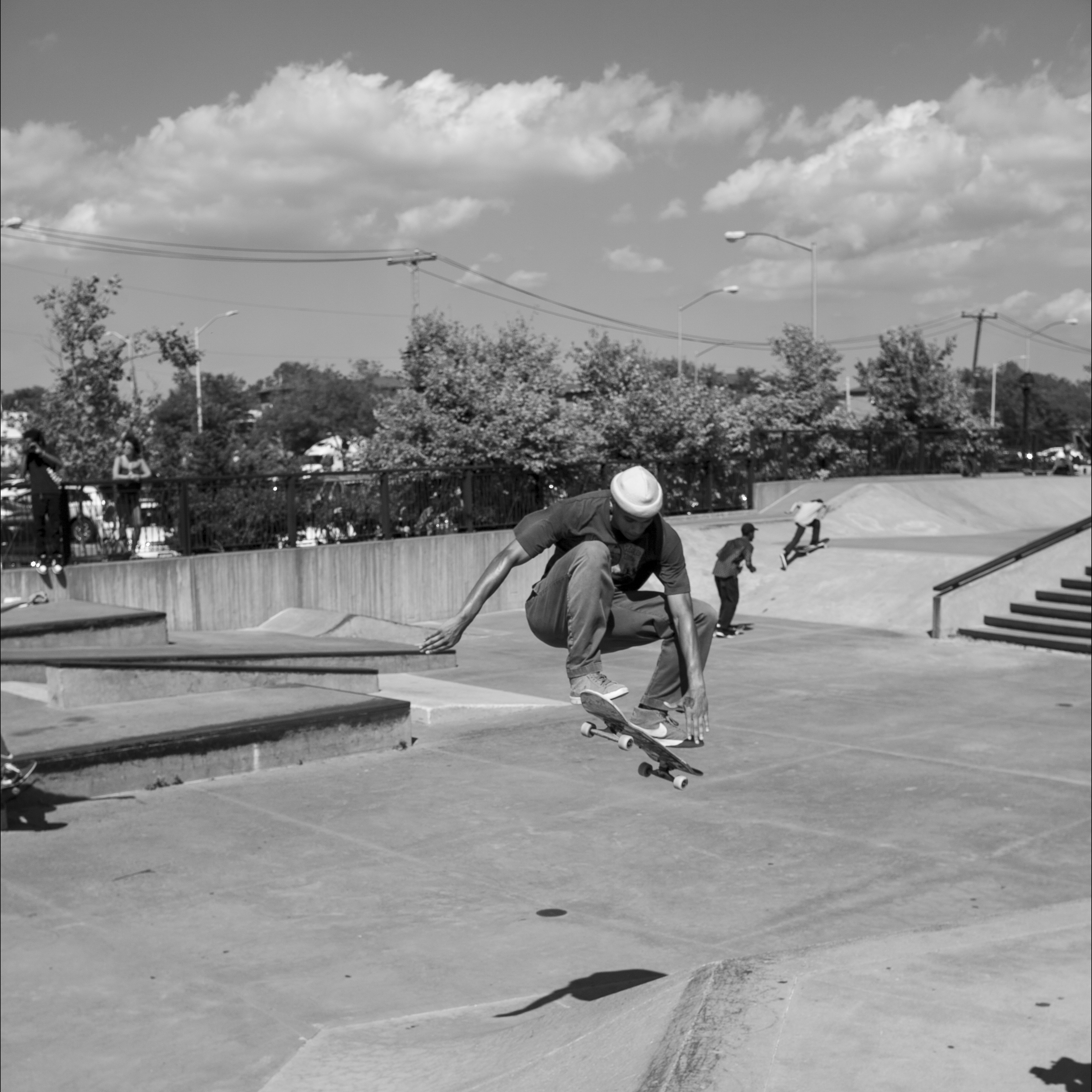

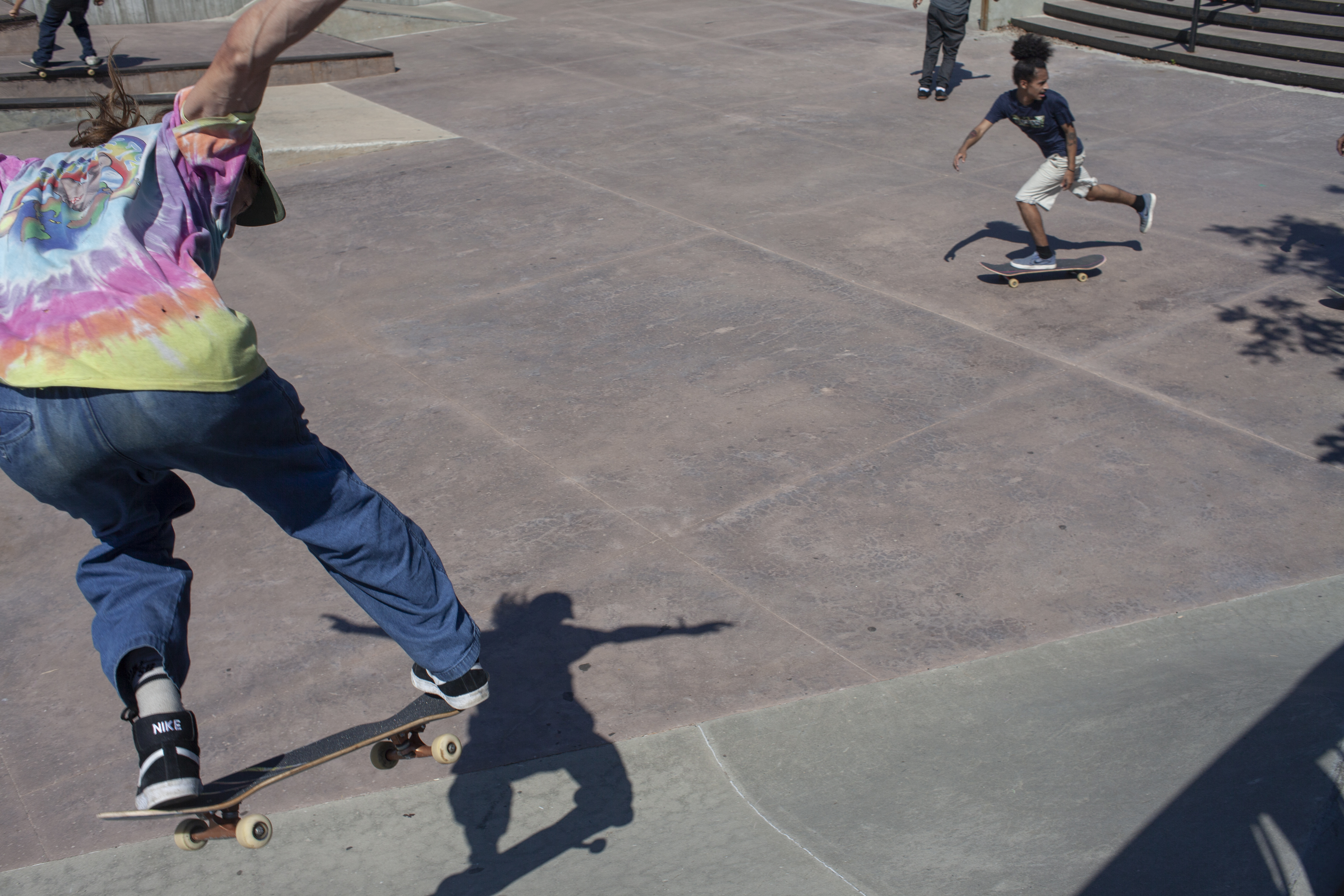
