= Skatepark =

Park intended for skateboarding and similar activities

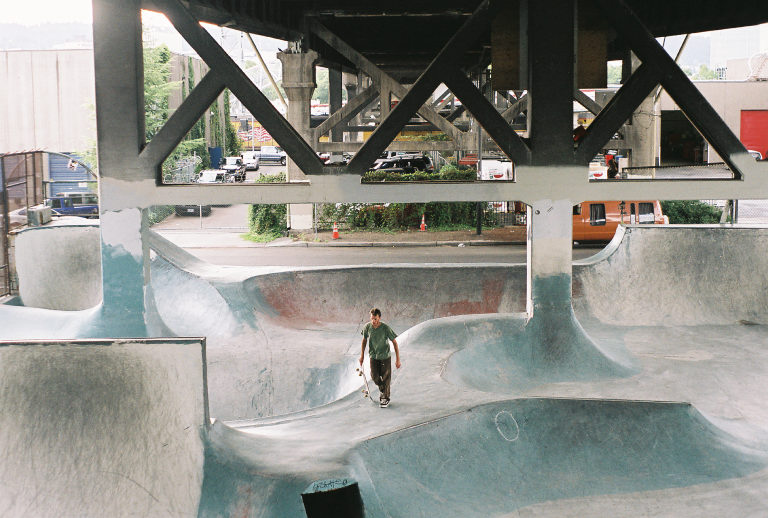
Burnside Skatepark in Portland, Oregon

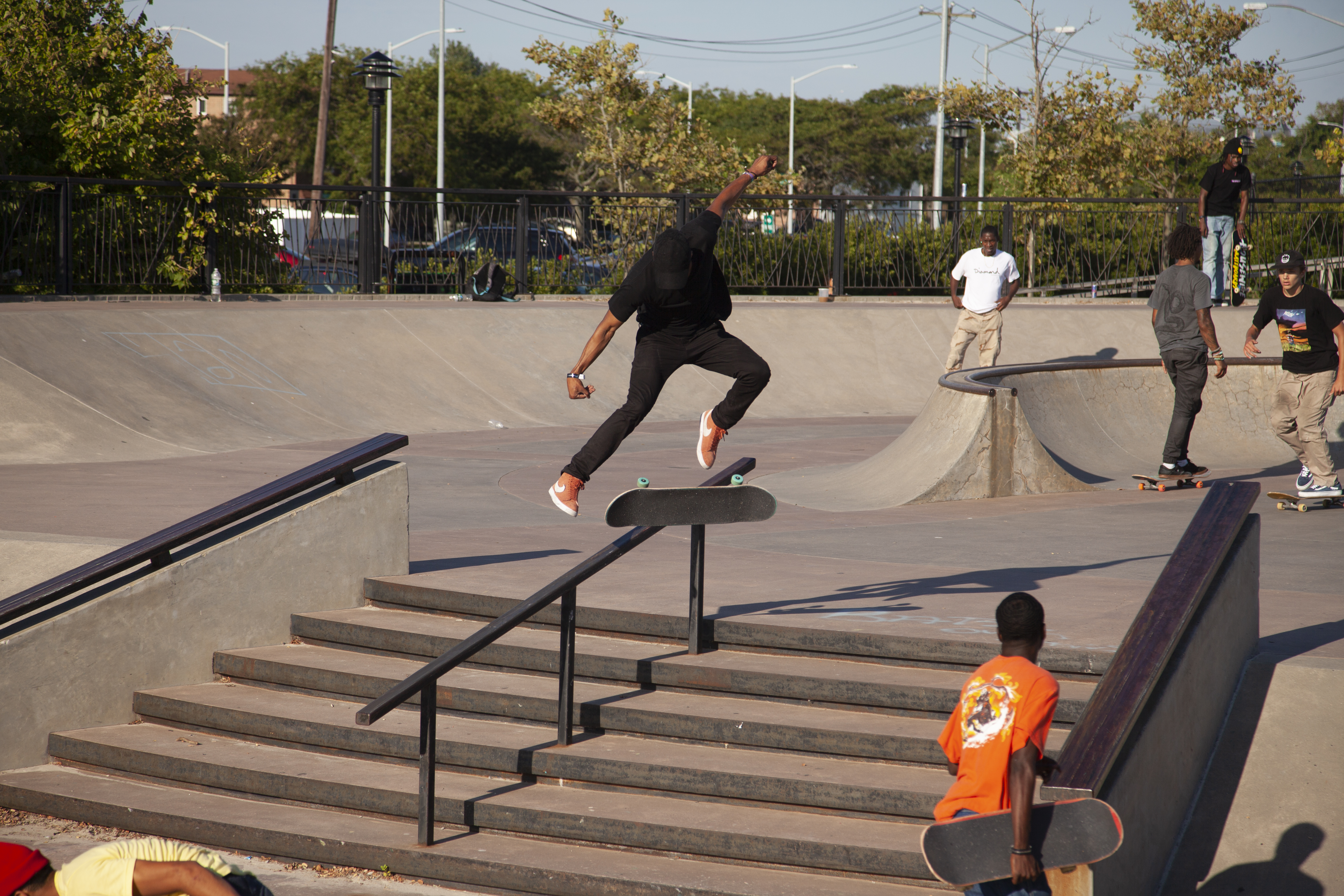
Far Rockaway Skatepark in Queens, New York City

Iso-Vilunen Skatepark in Tampere, Finland

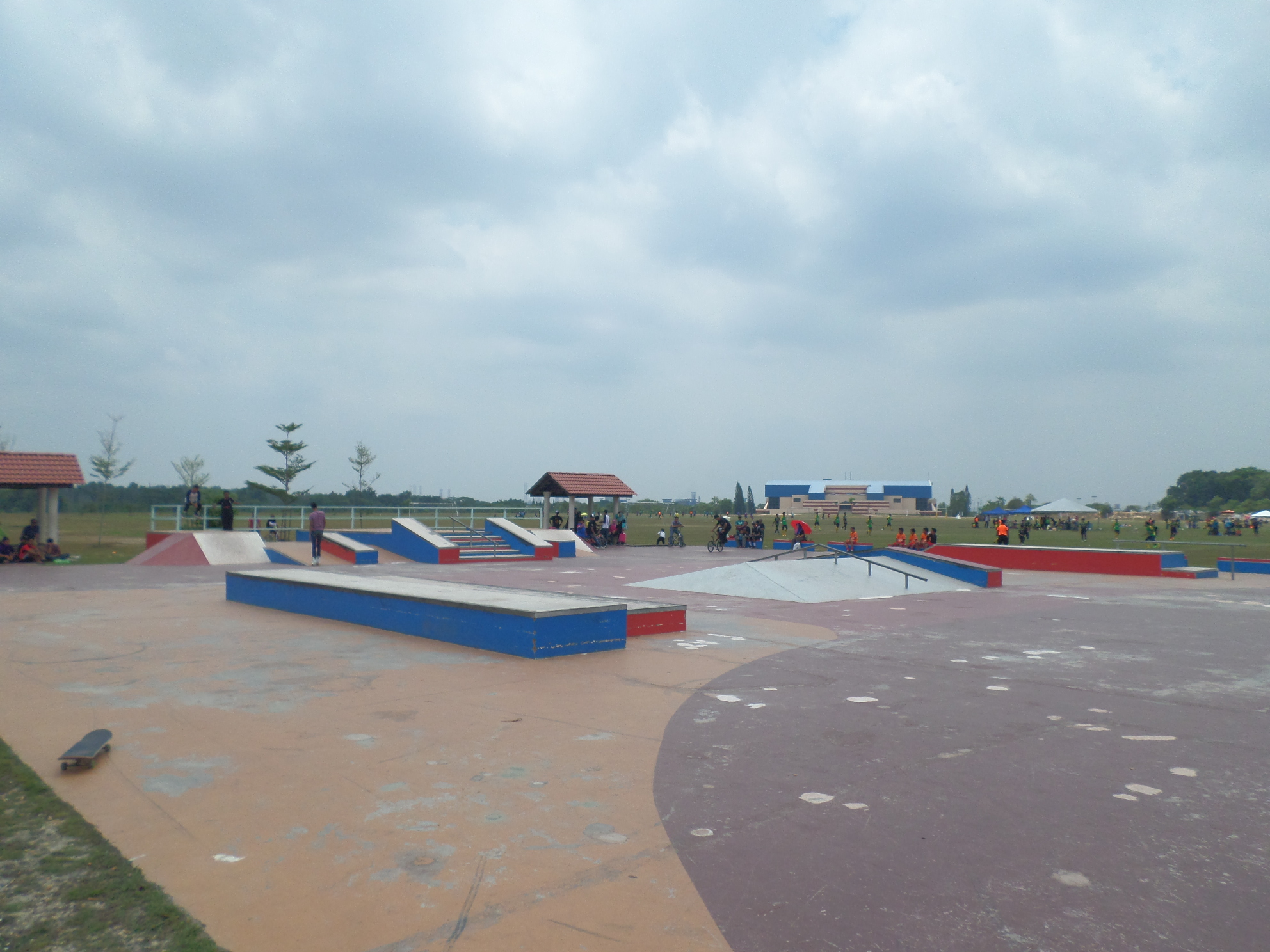
Pasir Gudang Skate Park in Johor, Malaysia

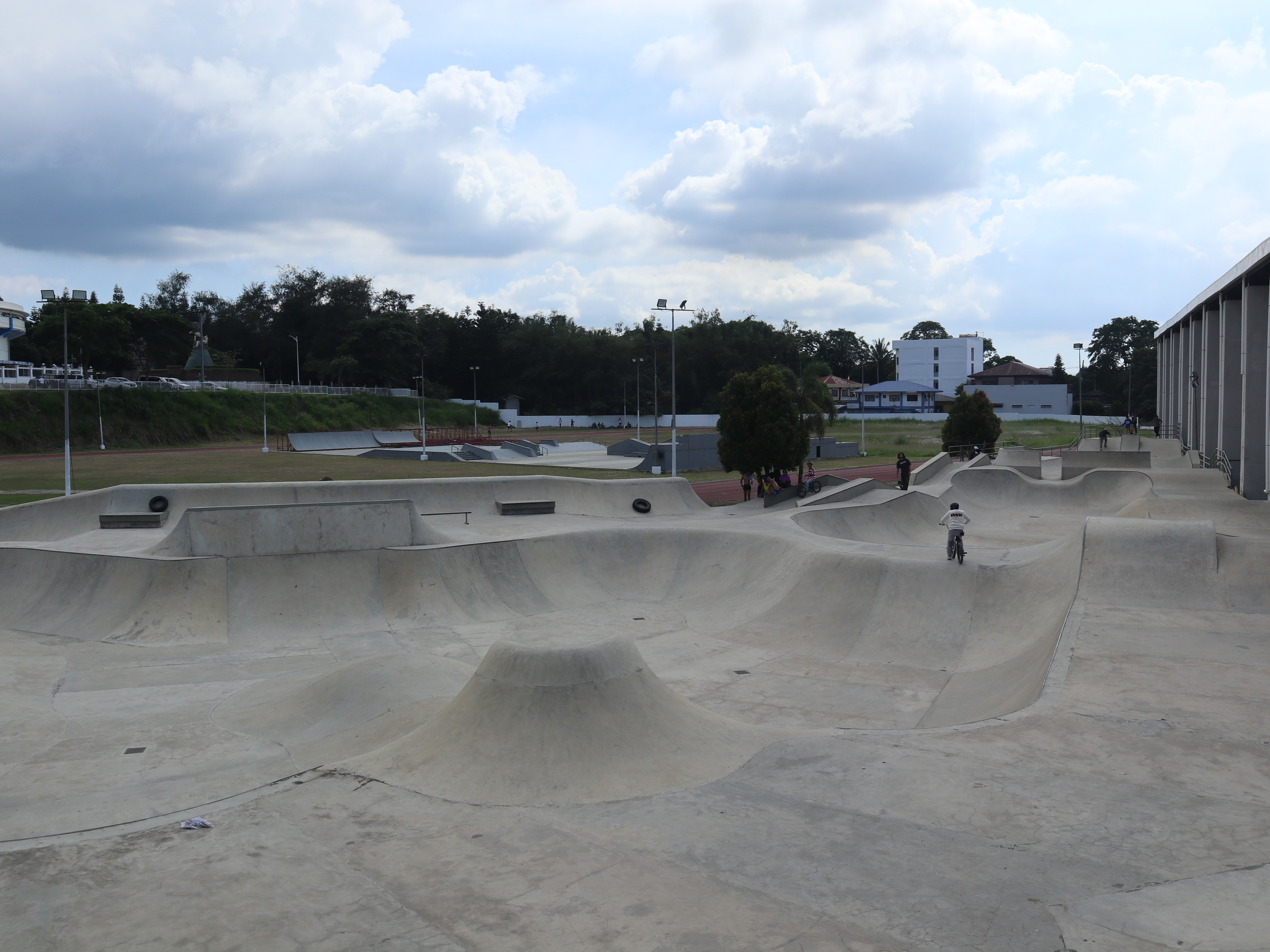
A skate park in Tagaytay, Cavite, Philippines

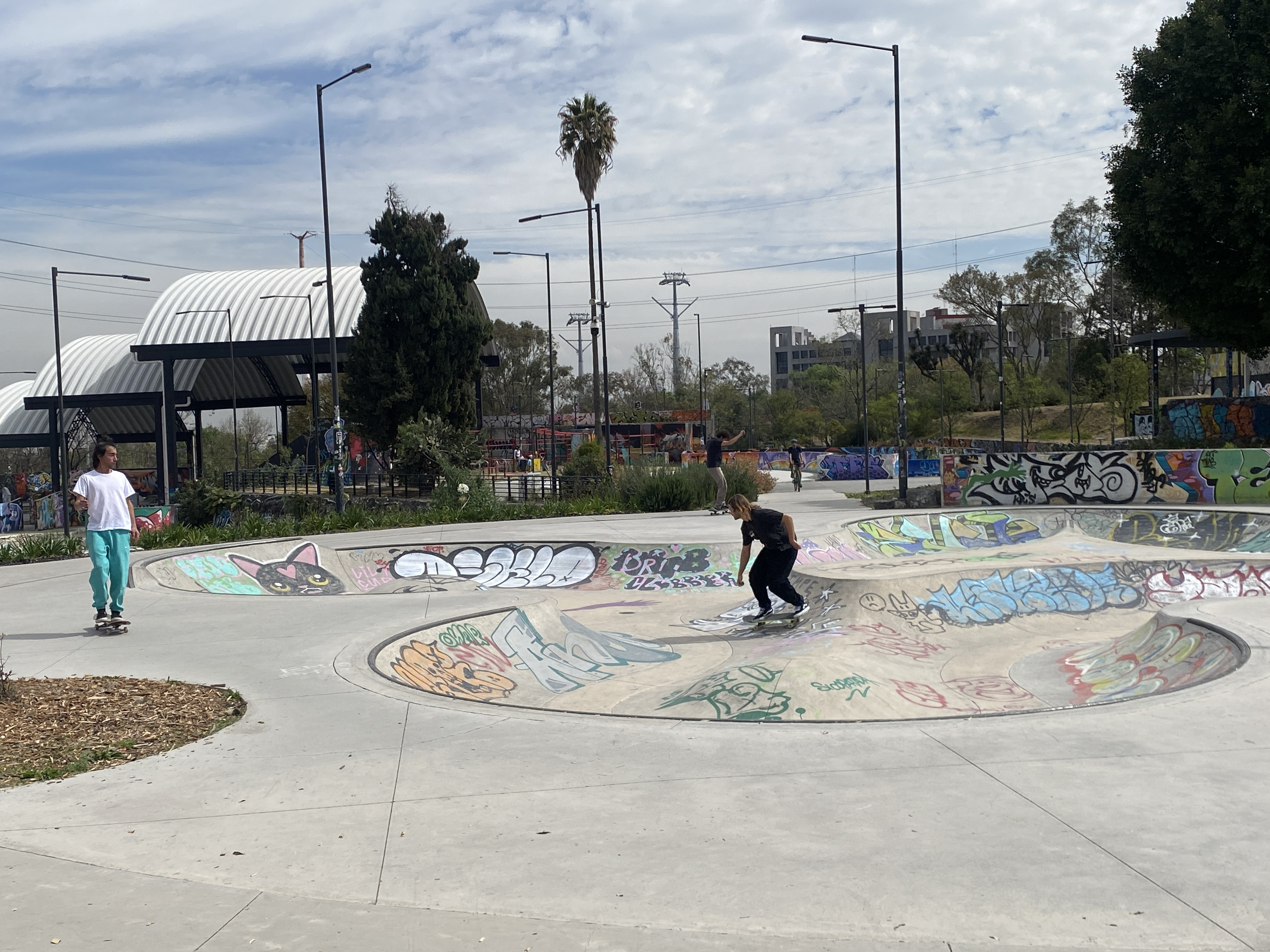
Skatepark in Chapultepec Park, Mexico City

A skatepark, or skate park, is a specially designed recreational space for activities such as skateboarding, BMX, scootering, WCMX (wheelchair motocross) and aggressive inline skating. A skatepark may contain half-pipes, handrails, funboxes, vert ramps, stairsets, quarter pipes, ledges, spine transfers, pyramids, banked ramps, full pipes, pools, bowls, snake runs, and any number of other objects.

== History ==
Most of the early skateparks were in the United States. The first skatepark in the world, Surf City, opened for business at 5140 East Speedway Road in Tucson, Arizona on September 3, 1965. Patti McGee, Women's National Champion, attended the grand opening. The park had concrete ramps and was operated by Arizona Surf City Enterprises, Inc. A skatepark for skateboarders and skaters made of plywood ramps on a half-acre lot in Kelso, Washington, opened in April 1966. It was lighted for night use. California's first, the Carlsbad Skatepark opened on March 3, 1976. The World Skateboard Championships were held here on April 10, 1977. It operated until 1979, when it was buried intact beneath a layer of dirt for more than two decades, before being destroyed in 2005. The current Carlsbad Skatepark is in a different location. The East Coast's first skatepark, Ocean Bowl Skate Park, in Ocean City, Maryland, opened the first week of June, 1976. Due to time, wear, and the current needs of skaters, the old bowl and ramp were torn down in the Fall of 1997 and the new park opened in July 1998. The Sandy Hills Skate Park, in Lansdowne, Maryland, is the oldest operating municipal skate park in the United States. In 1999 the city of Hermosa Beach, California opened a small skatepark at the site of the first skateboard competition. The competition held at the Pier Avenue Junior High School (now a city museum) was organized by Dewey Weber across the street from his surf and skateboard shop. Makaha Skateboards was a sponsor of the competition. In 1987, an all wooden indoor skate park, called CT Bike, opened in Bristol, Connecticut . CT Bike is where Tony Hawk made his debut when he was a young boy on his first East Coast tour. Until its closing in 2022, the indoor skate park was operated by the same family who built the park despite a fire that threatening the park in 1988. As of 2022 the park is now permanently closed.

In more extreme climates, parks were built indoors, often using wood or metal. By the end of the 1970s, the popularity of skateboarding had waned, and the original parks of the era began to close. A downturn in the overall skateboard market in the 1980s, coupled with high liability insurance premiums, contributed to the demise of the first wave of skateparks. Some second-generation parks, such as Upland, California's Pipeline, survived into the 1980s. However, few of the private parks of the 1970s remain, with the notable exception of Kona Skatepark in Jacksonville, Florida. However, many public parks of that era can still be found throughout Western Europe, Australia and New Zealand.

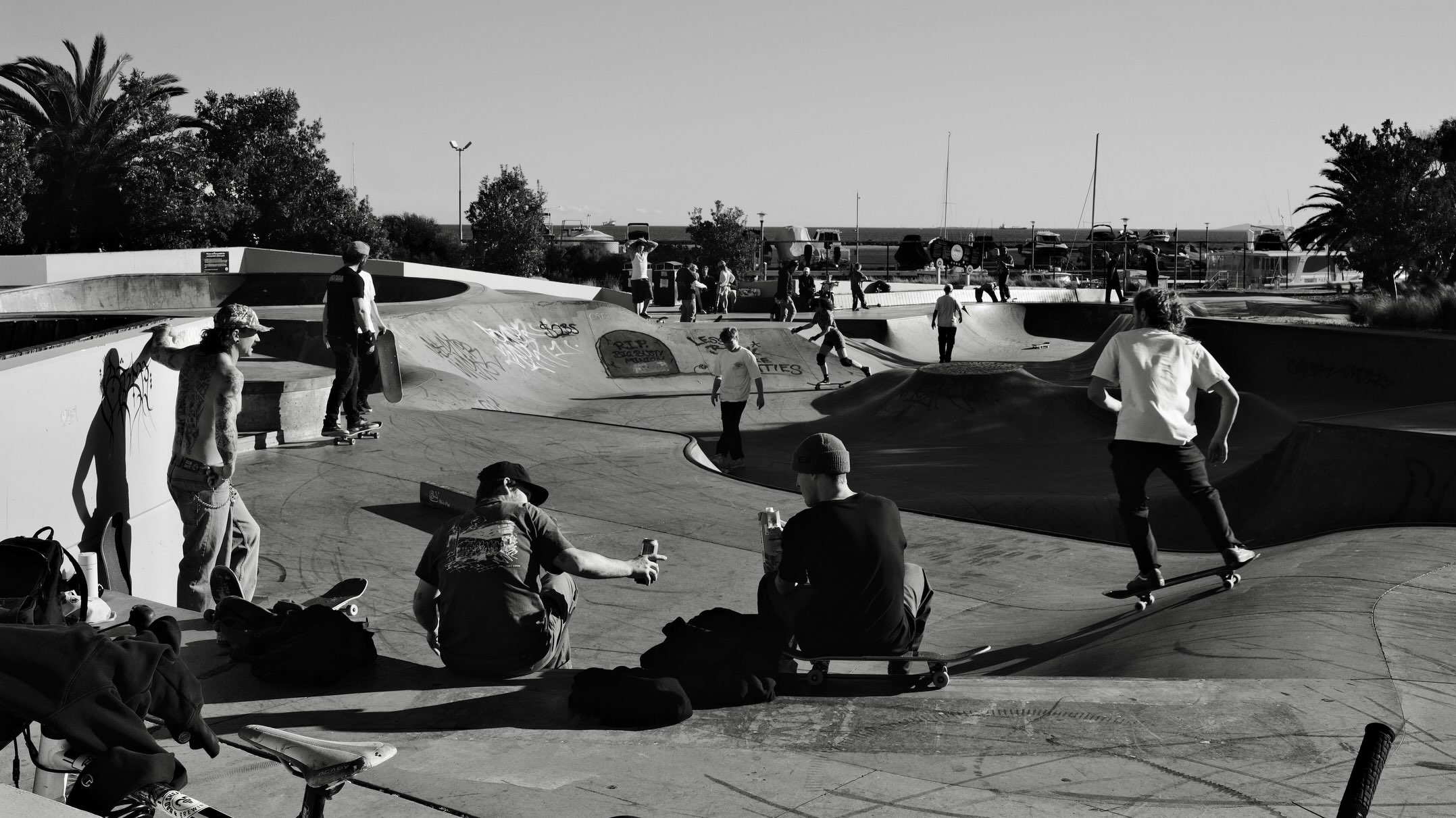
Skatepark on the St Kilda foreshore.

The modern skatepark designs of the Pacific Northwest can be traced back to Burnside Skatepark, a DIY "barge build" beneath the Burnside Bridge in Portland, Oregon. Skateboarders used an area populated primarily by the city's "undesirable elements" to create a skatepark, building one section at a time. The process is called "design/build" (D/B), and is a characteristic of many skateparks today. The design/build process ensures that adjacent skatepark features are harmonious and rideable, allowing skateboarders to create endless "lines" to ride among the many features.

Skate parks, related obstacles/ramps and locations designed for extreme sport utilization have made their way into the media over time, such as with the aforementioned Burnside Skatepark being included in the movie Free Willy.

Public skateparks have had a resurgence in the US, made possible by legislation such as California's 1998 law stating that skateboarding is an inherently "Hazardous Recreational Activity" (HRA), and therefore municipalities and their employees may not be held liable for claims of negligence resulting in skateboarders' injuries.

Street skating has blurred the line between skateparks and street spots. Some cities are starting to put in skate spots/plazas with features that would not have been classically designed for skateboarding, but can be skated by street skaters legally. In some instances, street spots that were not originally designed for skateboarding have been converted into sanctioned skate plazas.

There is also an emerging movement of making art and sculpture skate-able. This provides additional legal skate spots that blend well with other city art and landscape features. Skate-able art allows for the creation of thriving multi-use areas, as installations often become picturesque destinations for skaters and non-skaters alike.

== Types ==
Unlike organized sports, like basketball or football, skateboarding has no set arena or rules and skateparks have no standard design template. Each skatepark is designed specifically to provide unique challenges to its users. There are, however, three main categories of skatepark design: bowl, street plaza and flow parks.

Bowl parks are designed to emulate and improve upon the pool skating experience. Skaters in bowl parks can move around the park without taking their feet off the board to push. The curved walls of bowls allow skaters to ride around and across the bowl in addition to the back and forth skating you might see on a traditional half pipe. Bowls and bowl parks come in an endless variety of shapes and sizes but most bowls are between 3' and 12’ deep.

Street plaza parks are the favorite of the vast majority of skaters and they are designed to emulate and improve upon the street skating experience. Obstacles in a street plaza are styled to look like natural street terrain such as stairs, railings, planters and benches. Skaters will push off with their feet to gain momentum in a street plaza. The first public outdoor skate plaza is the Vancouver Skate Plaza, built in 2004 by New Line Skateparks.

Flow parks (or Park style) combine elements of both bowl parks and street plazas. In a well designed flow park a skater can pump around the parks curved walls such as quarter pipes, pump bumps and bowl corners without taking their feet off to push. They can use that speed to hit street obstacles such as stairs, railings and benches.

Skateparks may be privately or publicly owned. Privately owned skateparks usually have admission fees, while publicly owned skateparks are generally free. Many privately owned skateparks are indoors, usually in warehouses, roller rinks or buildings with high ceilings, especially in areas with snowy winters. Public skateparks are usually outdoors.

Skatepark construction can be divided into two major categories — prefabricated and custom built concrete. Prefabricated parks can be made of wood, plastic, sheet metal, and concrete. Most are designed and built by playground equipment manufacturers who present these parks as a cost-effective alternative to custom-designed concrete skateparks. In reality, custom built concrete skateparks can be quite cost competitive with prefabricated skate ramps.

According to an editor of Transworld Skateboarding magazine, concrete parks are now "pretty much the industry standard" as they require fewer repairs and less maintenance.

== Elements ==
- Bank – These can vary in angle but are simply wedge ramps for traversing obstacles, i.e. elevated flats. They may contain curvature at the tops or on sides.
- Bowl – a completely enclosed area of quarterpipes that curve in corners. The curve placement and opposing quarterpipe placement can manifest in any fashion.
- Cradle – Spherical bowl turned on its side, typically connected with a bowl. Enables inverted and over-vert carving
- Deck – The flat elevated area used as a staging area above ramps and bowls.
- Egg bowl – a bowl shaped like an egg
- Escalator – sloping increases or decreases in quarterpipe or halfpipe ramp.
- Extension – extensions in quarter pipe or halfpipe ramps.
- Flat – The flat lower areas between transitions, usually at grade.
- Flatbar – A rail set level with ground.
- Foam pit – A pile of foam pads to land safely into while learning tricks, usually found after a launch ramp.
- Funbox – A combination of banks, flats, rails, kickers, etc. connected to each other to form mini gaps.
- Half pipe – Two quarter pipes facing each other (half of a pipe). A smaller halfpipe that is less than 8–10 feet can be referred to as a "mini ramp"
- Handrail – A rail going with a staircase, either extended from the staircase or off an adjacent wall
- Hip – Essentially two quarter pipes or banks forming an angle.
- Kidney bowl – a bowl roughly in the shape of a human kidney
- Kinked rail – A rail with two flat sections, one higher than the other, and a sloped section in the middle connecting them.
- Launcher/Kicker – A curved bank a rider uses to launch into the air.
- Pool – Usually an actual swimming pool that has been drained out for skateboarding.
- Pyramid – Funbox-type ramp made from four banks put in a square pyramid shape, usually surrounding a flat.
- Quarter pipe – Literal quarter of a pipe. There is usually a narrow metal rod running the length of the top edge; this is called the coping. There may also be a flat platform connected to it at the top; this is called the deck. Quarter pipes have "transitions" which is the size of the radius of the ramps riding surface.
- Roll-in – A long sloping ramp used to gain speed.
- Sloped rail – A rail set at an angle.
- Spine – Two quarter pipes placed back to back, that do not contain a deck. Spines may exist in bowls and half-pipes
- Stair – A simple staircase.
- Step-up/Eurobox – A funbox type ramp consisting of a bank with a flat at the top and a second, higher flat after it; in other words a bank-to-flat setup with a section removed from the bank part.
- Vert wall – A vertical wall above, and sometimes slightly behind, a quarter pipe.
- Wall-box – In an indoor skatepark, this is a funbox built against the wall of the park; in an outdoor skatepark, it is a funbox with a wall splitting it down the middle.

== Notable skateparks ==
See also Category:Skateparks

- Bro Bowl – One of the last skateparks of the 70s, and one of the oldest skateparks in the U.S.; First public skatepark in Florida Tampa, Florida.
- Burnside Skatepark – Portland, Oregon featured in Tony Hawk video games and the movies, Free Willy and Paranoid Park.
- Concrete Wave Country – Nashville's first public skatepark.
- Cowboys Park (Calgary, Alberta, Canada) – One of the world's largest outdoor skateparks, designed by Spectrum Skateparks with Landplan associates.
- etnies Skatepark, Lake Forest, CA – Largest free skatepark in California.
- FDR Skatepark – Philadelphia, Pennsylvania
- Harrow Skate Park – Harrow, London, England
- Kona Skate Park - Guinness World Record for Oldest Surviving Skatepark, located in Jacksonville, Florida
- Lee and Joe Jamail Skatepark – 30,000-square-foot (2,800 m^{2}) in-ground public facility in Houston, Texas.
- Louisville Extreme Park – Louisville, Kentucky.
- Monster Skatepark, Sydney Olympic Park
- Possum Creek – Gainesville, Florida.
- The Palm Springs Skatepark contains a replica of the Nude Bowl, which is the most popular feature in the park.
- Pacifica Skatepark – Oceanside skatepark, Pacifica, California
- Pedlow Skate Park – Encino, California great for pool skating, more than 12,000 square feet (1,100 m^{2}).
- Playing Place, Cornwall, UK
- Pyongyang Skatepark, the first skatepark in North Korea.
- Rampworx skatepark – The largest indoor venue in the UK, covering 50,000 square feet (4,600 m^{2}) and located in Liverpool, England.
- The Rom
- Santa Maria Skate Park – Fletcher Park. 700 Southside Pkwy, Santa Maria, California.
- Skatepark of Tampa – Skatepark in Tampa and home of the annual Tampa Pro.
- Skatopia – Anarchist Skatepark in Rutland, Ohio
- Stockwell Skatepark – South London, England
- Turf Skatepark – Built in 1979, included five concrete pools in an indoor/outdoor facility in Milwaukee, Wisconsin (defunct since 1996).

== Gallery ==
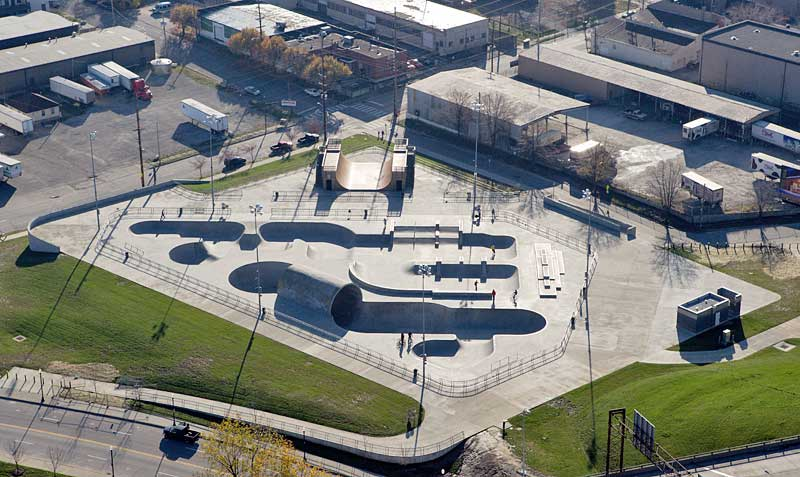
Louisville Extreme Park in Louisville, Kentucky in 2004

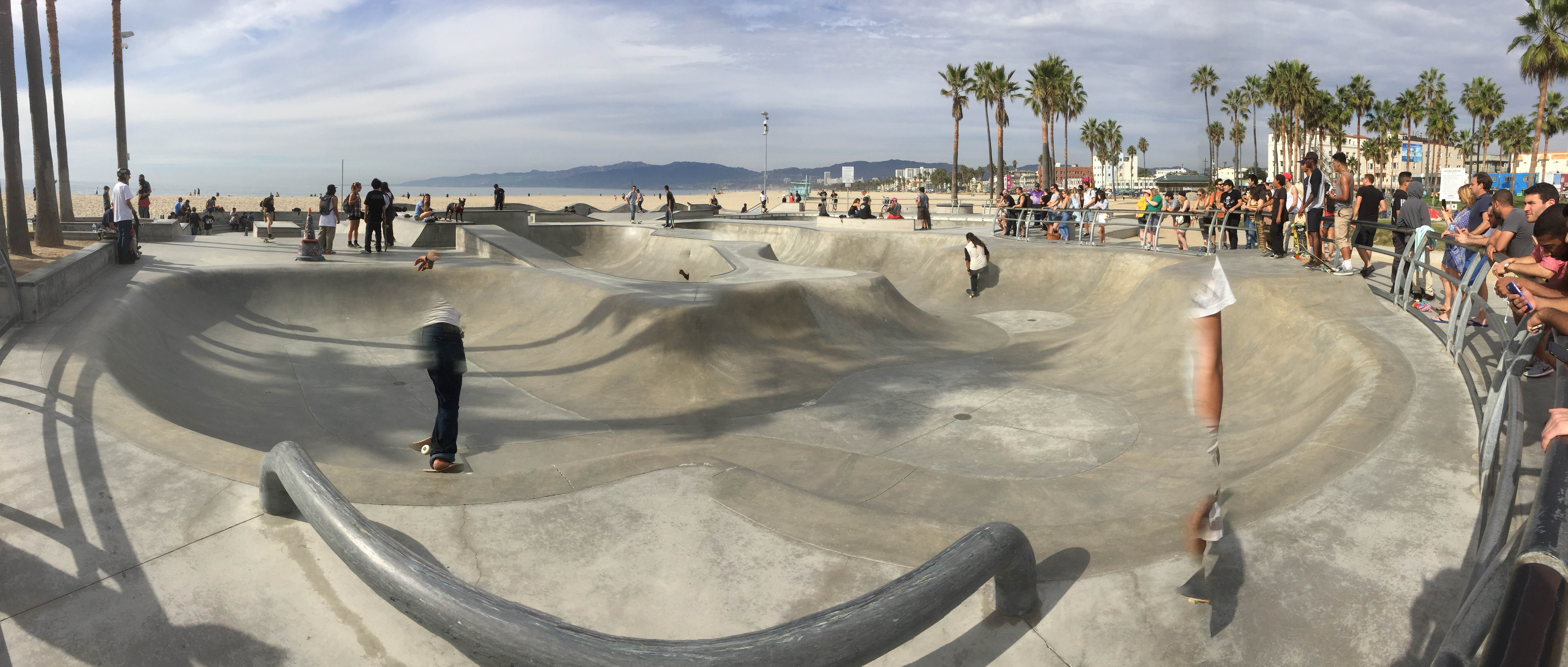
Venice Beach and Boardwalk in 2016

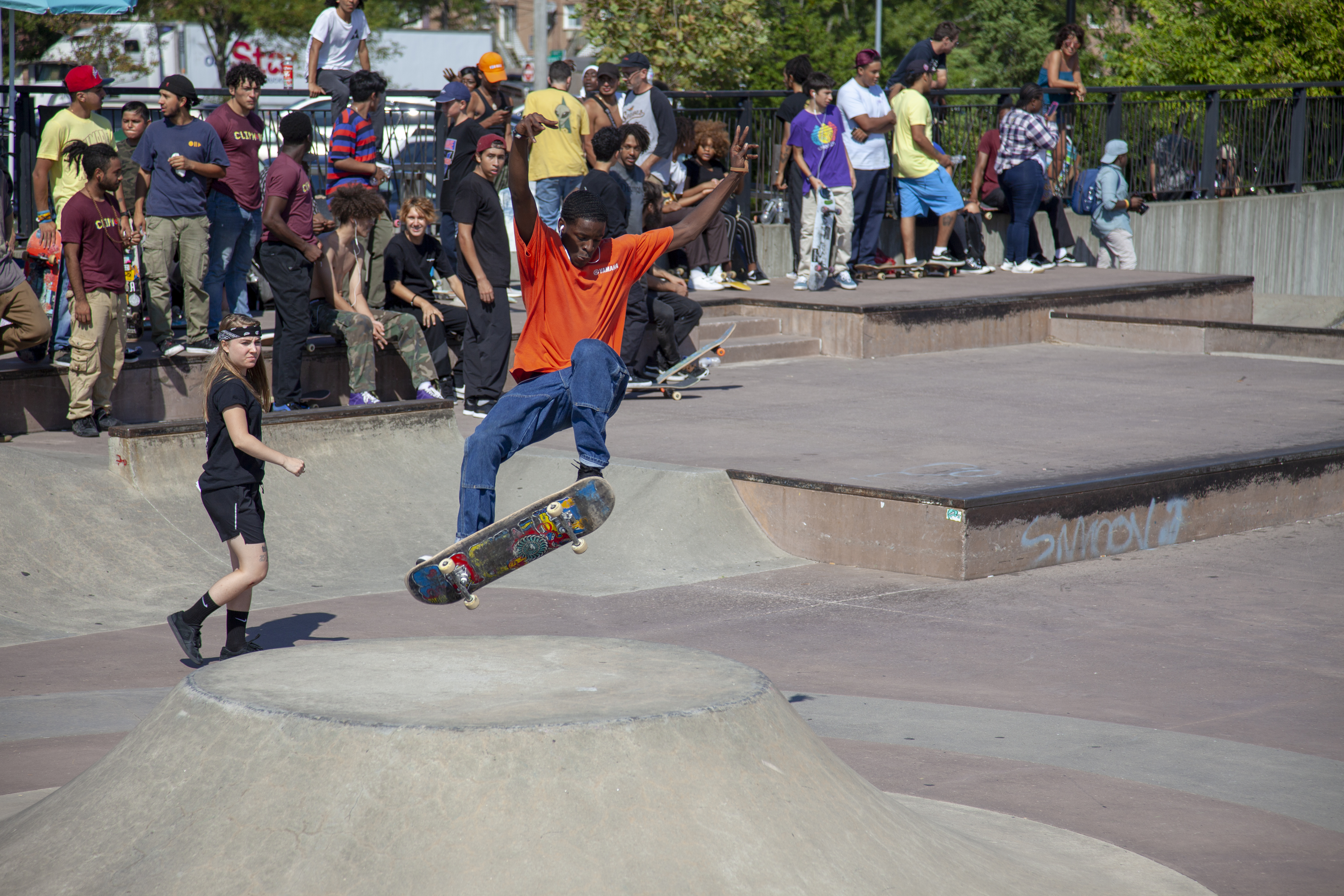
Far Rockaway Skatepark at Rockaway, Queens, N.Y. in 2019

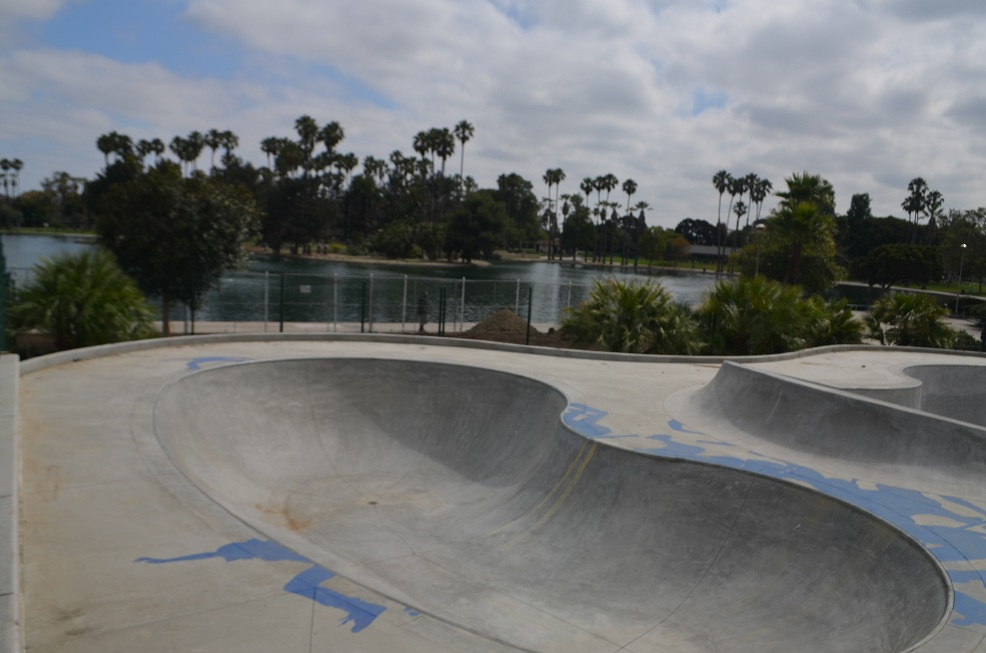
Alondra Skate Park in Gardena, California in 2012

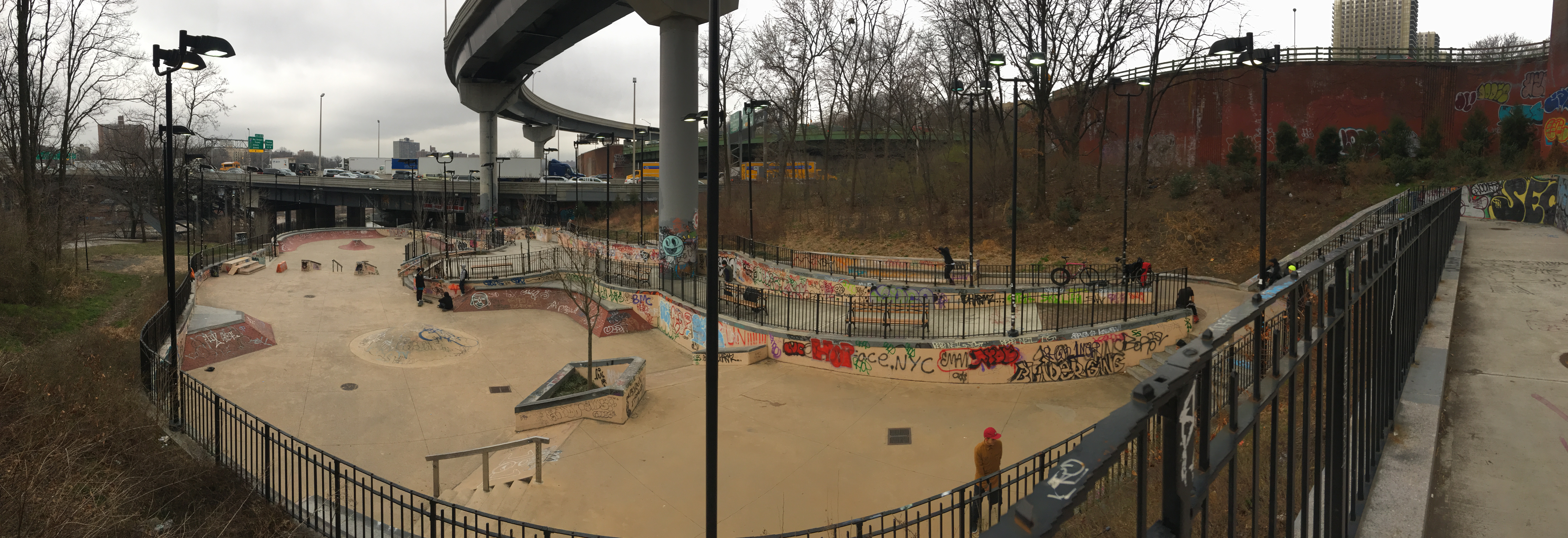
Hamilton Bridge Skatepark at Washington Heights, Manhattan, N.Y. in 2017

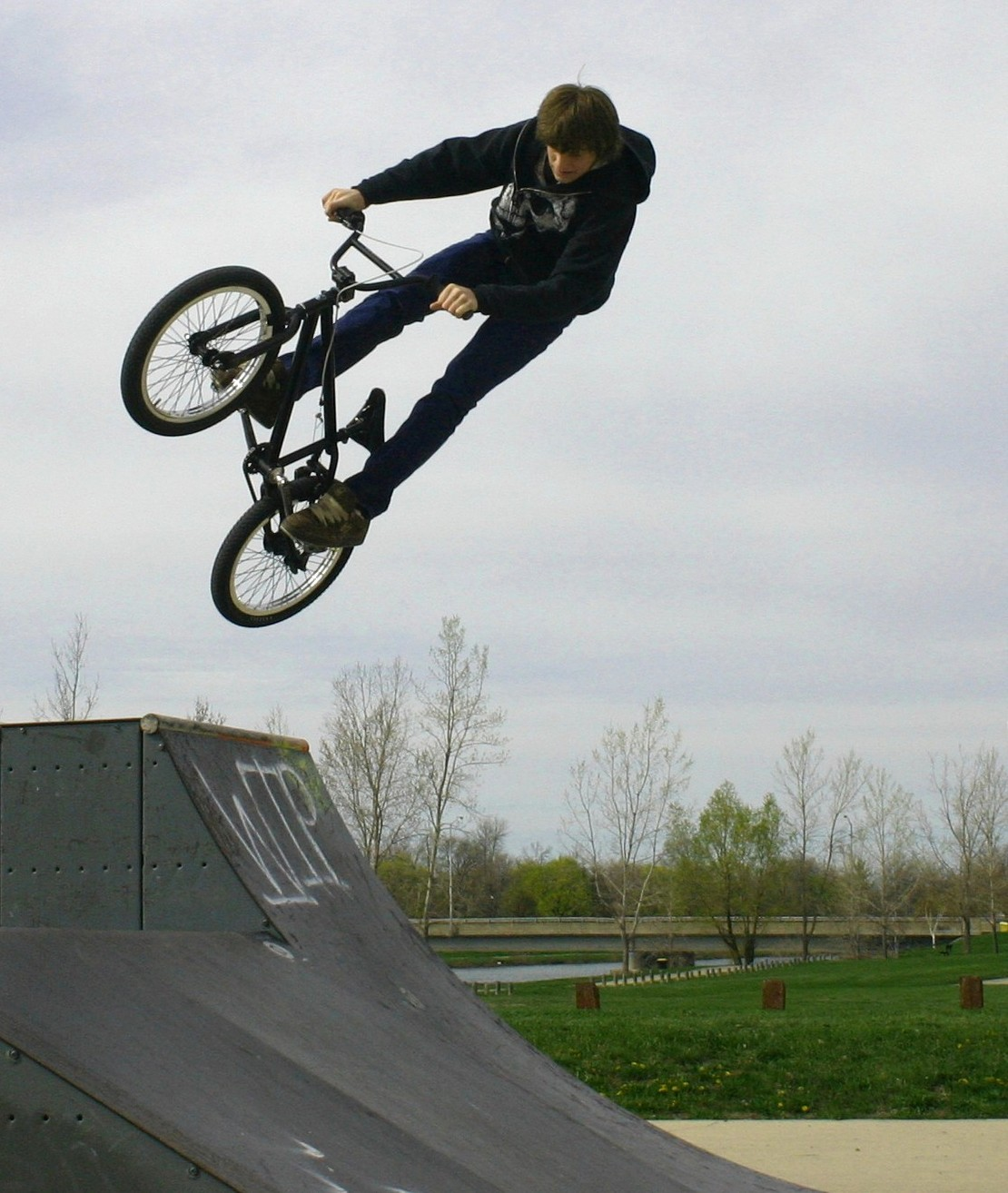
Welland Skate Park in Welland, Ontario in 2007

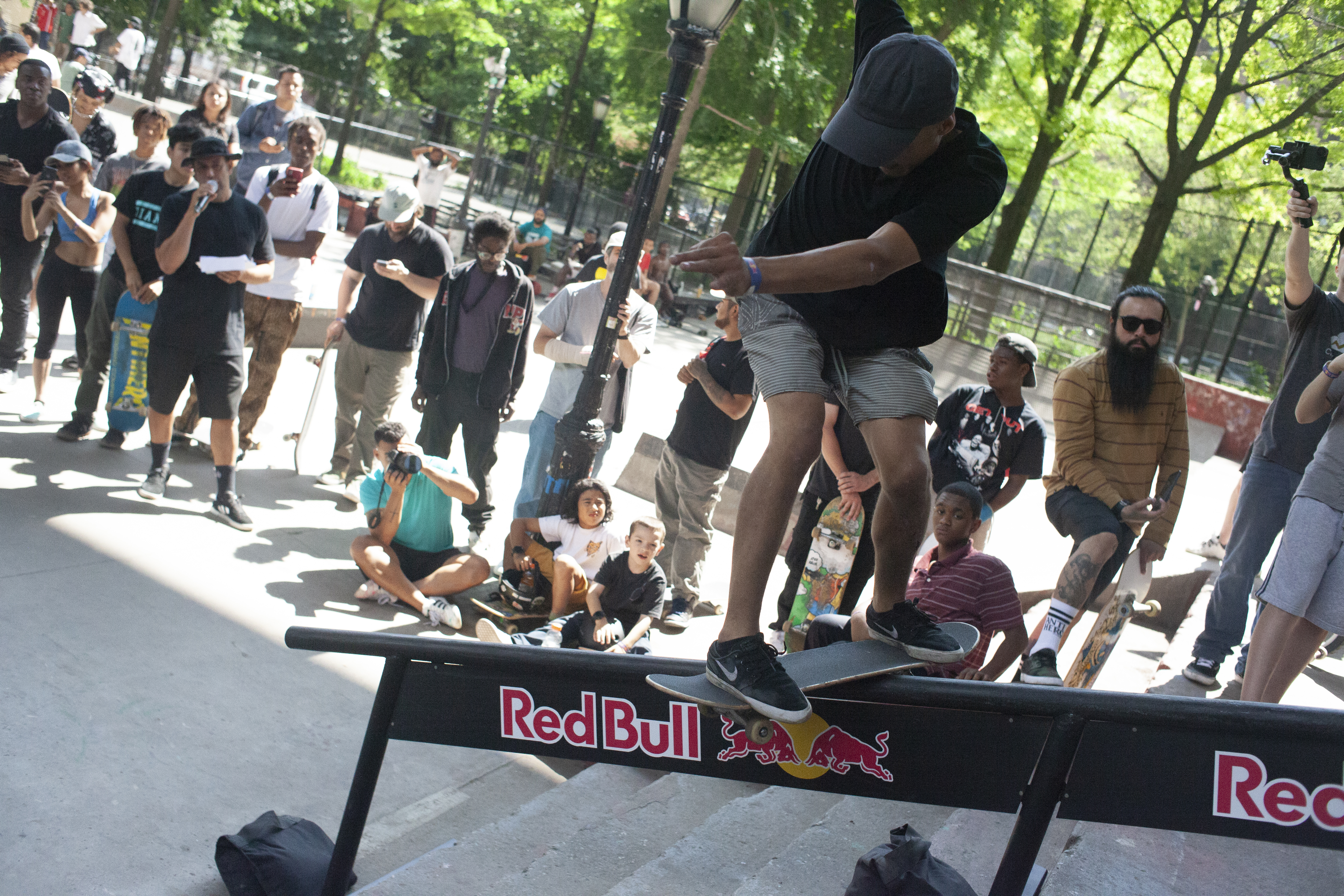
LES skatepark in Lower East Side, Manhattan, with Starlin Polanco performing in 2019

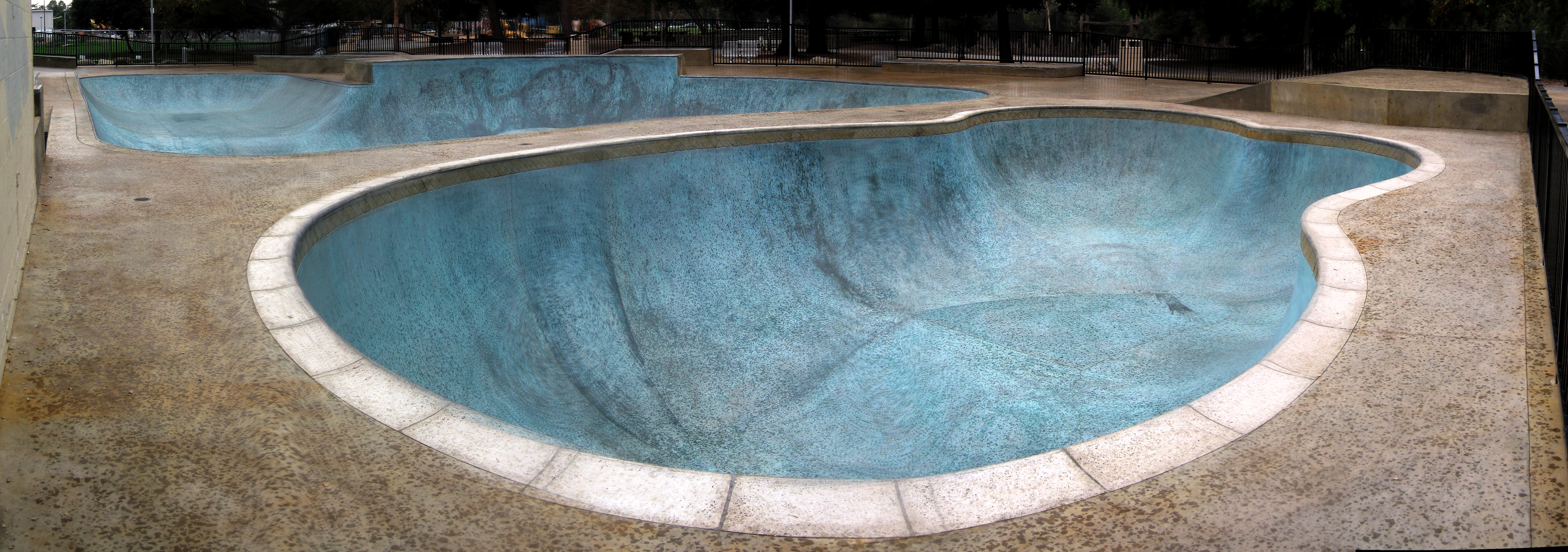
Roosevelt Skate Park in San Jose, California in 2008

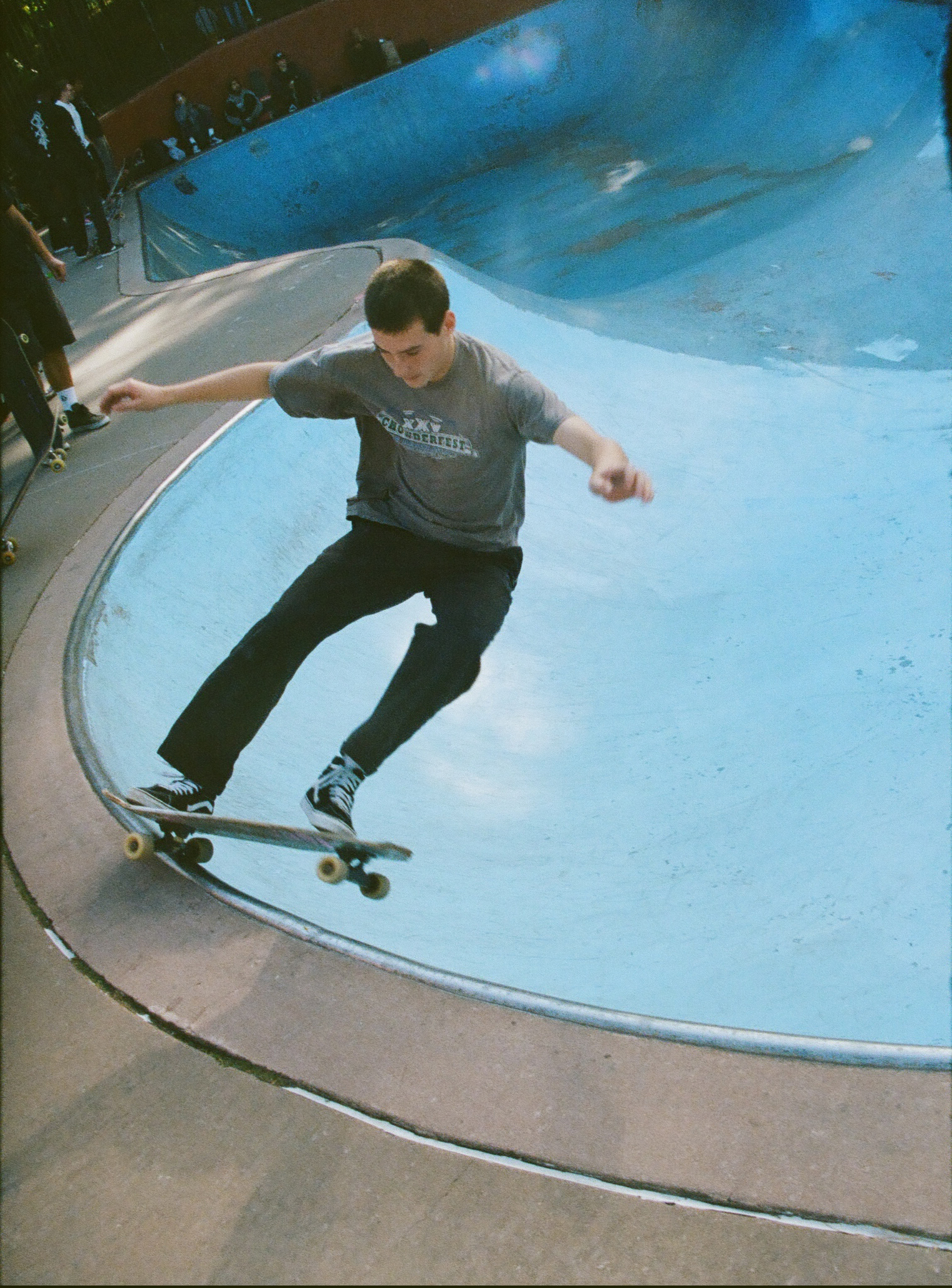
Millennium Skate Park, Owl's Head Park in Bay Ridge, Brooklyn, N.Y. in 2019

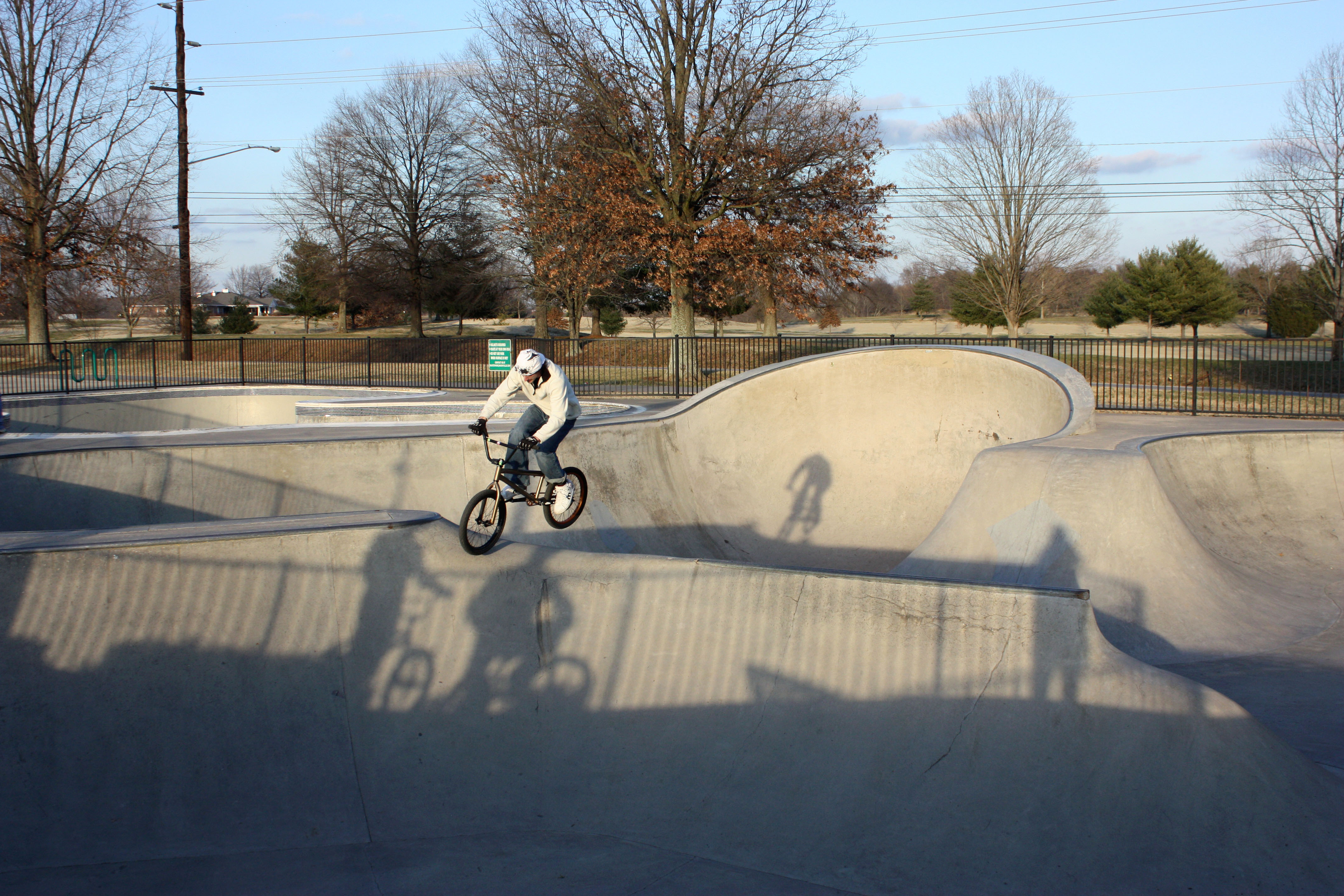
Nashville Skate Park in Nashville, Tennessee in 2009

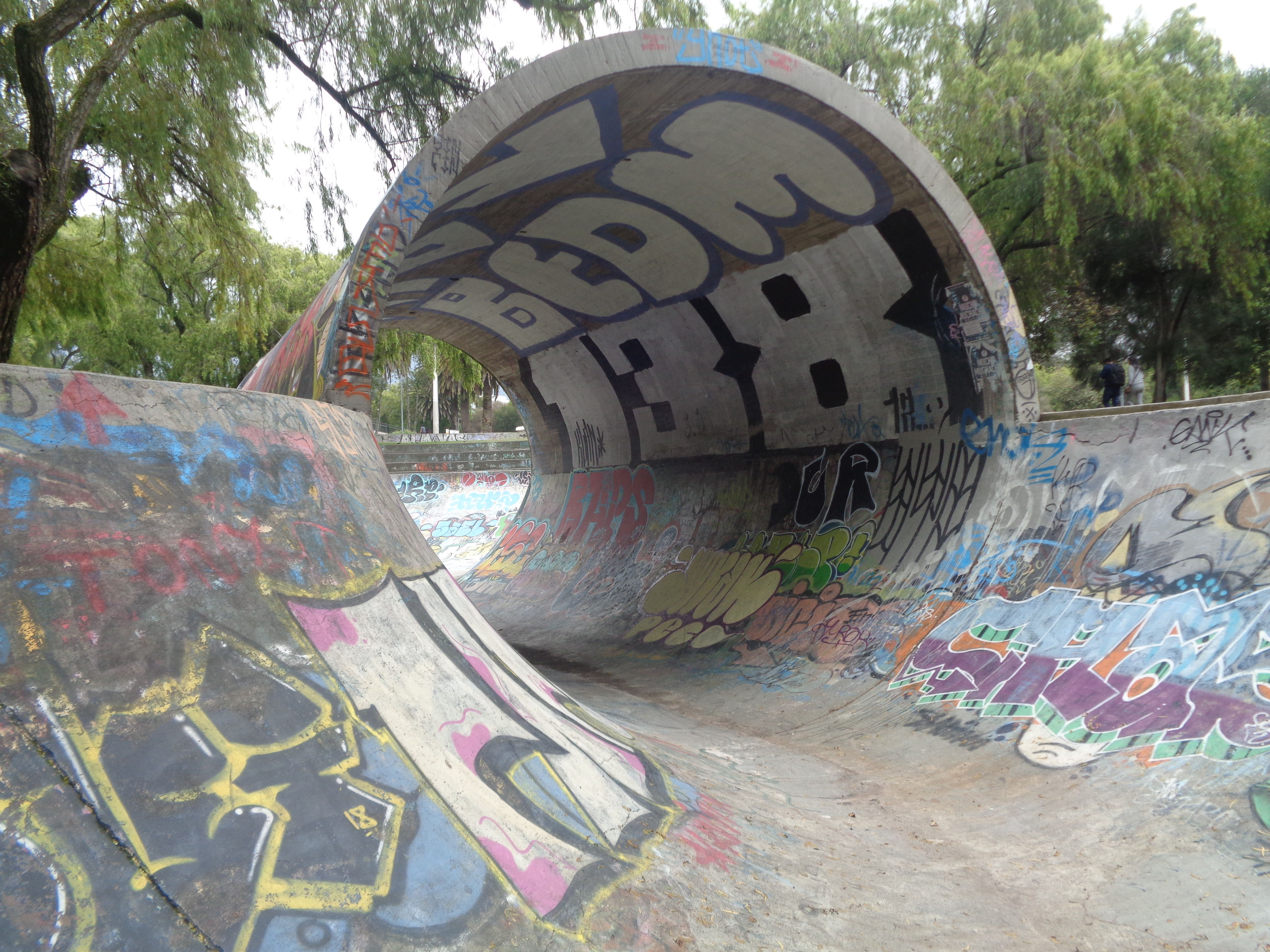
Parque La Carolina in Quito, Ecuador in 2019

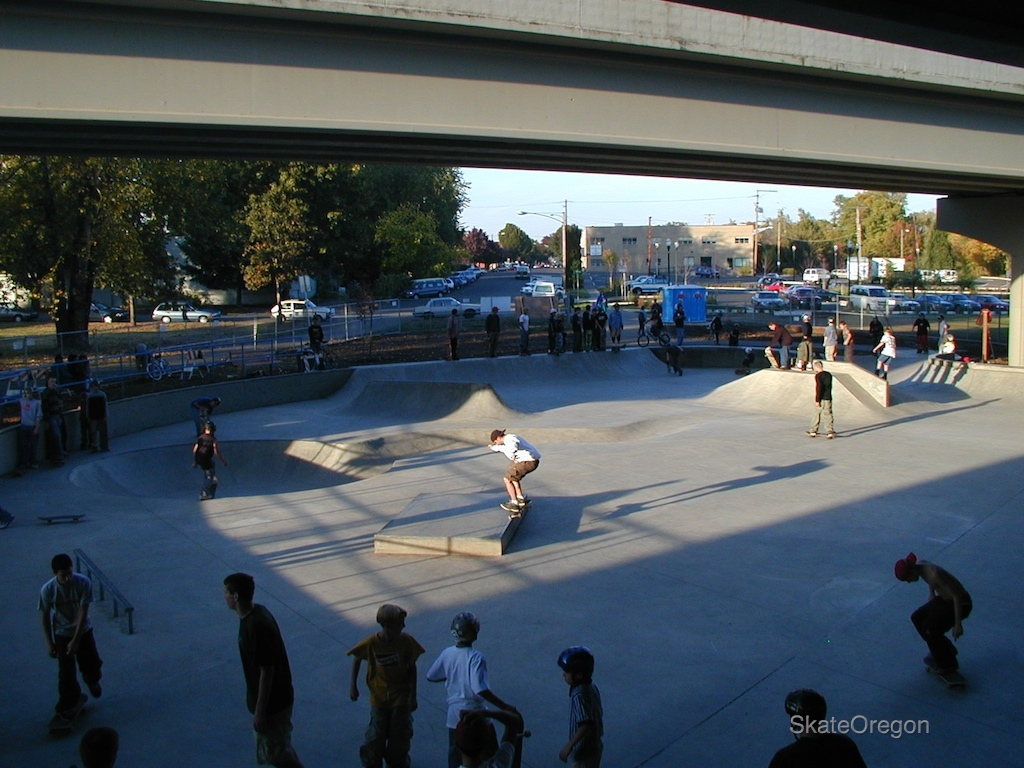
Eric Scott McKinley Skate Park in Corvallis, Oregon in 1999

Skate Open in Boston, Massachusetts in 2010

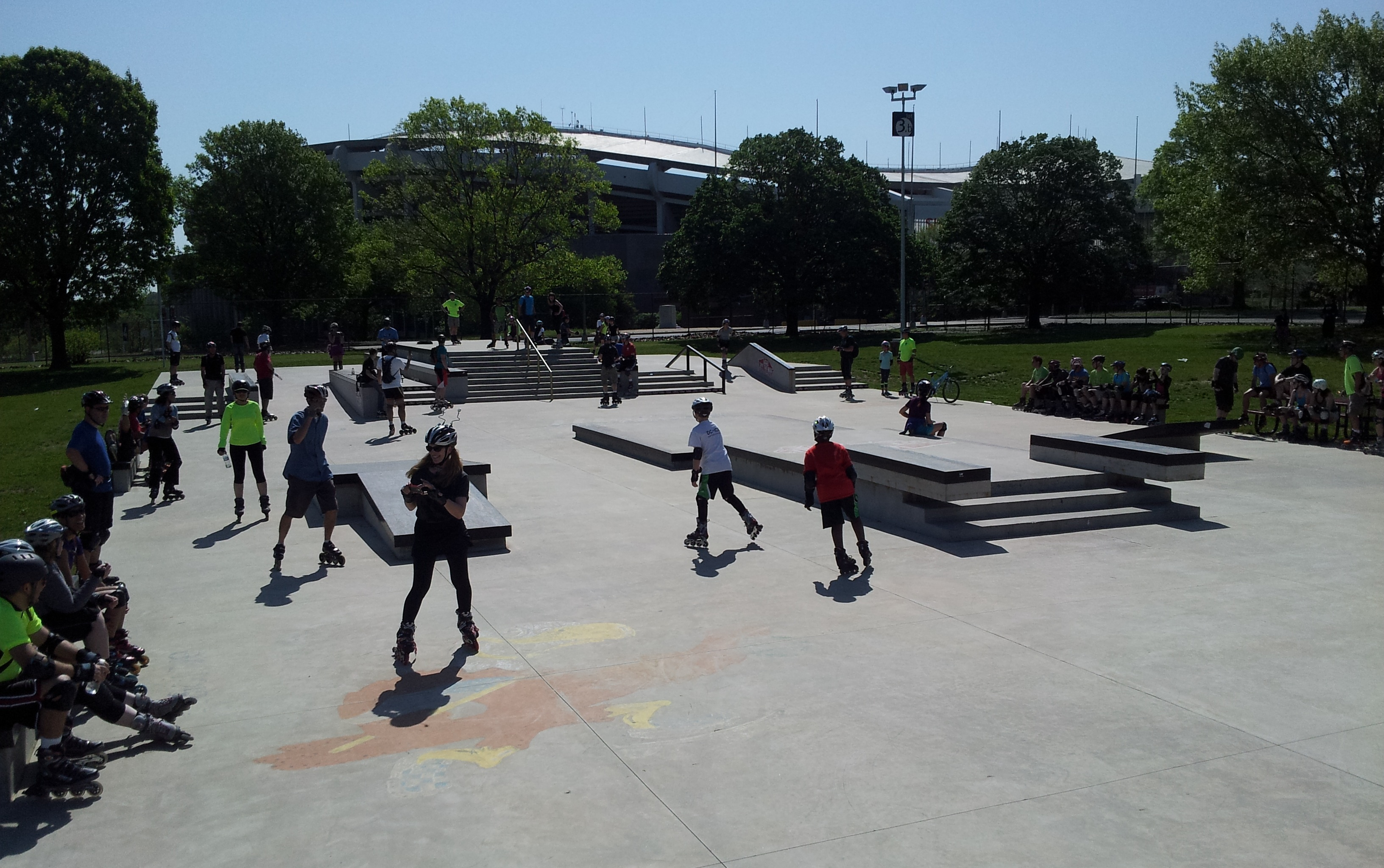
Skate Park at RFK Campus in Washington, D.C. in 2014

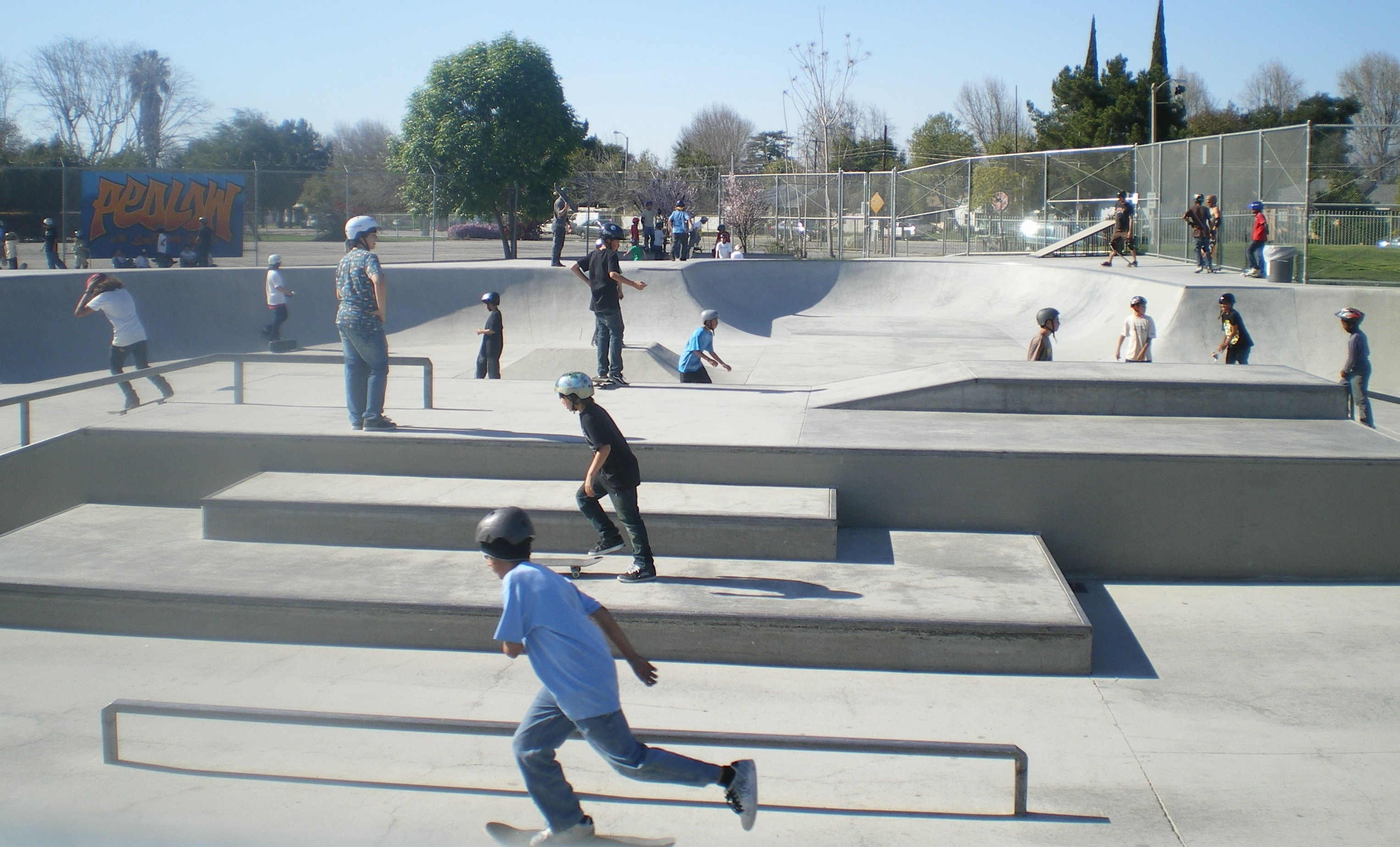
Pedlow Field Skate Park in Encino, California in 2008

== See also ==
- List of skateparks
