= List of skateparks =

This is a list of notable skateparks.

Builders of skateparks include local skateboarders creating do it yourself / "barge board" parks and firms such as SITE Design Group and Grindline Skateparks.

The first skatepark to receive historic designation was the Bro Bowl, in Florida, listed in the National Register of Historic Places. The second was The Rom, in east London, England, which is Grade II listed.

== Australia ==
- Bill Godfrey Oval
- City Sk8 Park, Adelaide
- Monster Skatepark, Sydney Olympic Park
- Pizzey Park
- Snake Run
- West Beach Skate Park

== Canada ==
- Legacy Skatepark, Ottawa's largest at 18,300 square feet (1,700 m^{2})
- Underpass Park, Toronto
- Vancouver Skate Plaza, Vancouver, once named 21st on a top-25 list of world's best skate parks
- Shaw Millennium Skatepark (Calgary, Alberta, Canada) – One of the world's largest outdoor skateparks, designed by Spectrum Skateparks with Landplan associates.

== Denmark ==
- Copenhagen Skatepark, Copenhagen
- Fælledparken Skatepark, Copenhagen

== France ==
- Palais omnisports Marseille Grand-Est, Marseille (billed as Europe's largest indoor skatepark as of 2009)

== Germany ==
- Mellowpark, Berlin

== India ==
- Desert Dolphin Skatepark, Khempur, Rajasthan.

== Jordan ==
- 7Hills Skatepark, Amman

== North Korea ==
- Pyongyang Skatepark, the first skatepark in North Korea.

== Portugal ==
- Chelas skatepark, was inaugurated in 2013, Chelas, Portugal
- Parque Das Gerações skatepark, was inaugurated in 2013, São João do Estoril, Portugal

== Philippines ==
- Koronodal Skate Park in Koronadal, Cotabato
- Mountain Dew Skate Park in Makati
- Tagaytay Extreme Sports Complex in Tagaytay, Cavite. The venue for skateboarding at the 2019 Southeast Asian Games.

== Serbia ==
- Bor Skate Plaza, in Bor. Largest skate park in the Balkans.

== Slovenia ==
- Skate park Rog ("Skejt park Rog") – the first covered skate park in Slovenia, at Rog (factory)

== Sweden ==
- Stapelbäddsparken in Malmö.

== United Kingdom ==
- The Buszy
- Harrow Skate Park – Harrow, UK
- Playing Place, an historic skatepark in a small Cornish village
- Radlands
- Rampworx skatepark, Liverpool. The largest indoor venue in the UK, covering 50,000 square feet (4,600 m^{2}).
- The Rom (1978), Grade II listed skatepark in Hornchurch, east London, England.
- Stockwell Skatepark – South London, UK
- Slades Farm Skatepark (1978), Bournemouth.
- St Neots Skatepark, Eaton Ford, St Neots
- Adrenaline Alley, Corby, Northamptonshire

== United States ==
=== Alabama ===
- City Walk Skatepark (2022), Birmingham, Alabama. Largest skatepark in the Southeastern United States and the fifth largest skatepark in the United States. More than 57,000 square feet (5,300 m^{2}). This skatepark is apart if the Birmingham's City Walk that spans more than 10 blocks and over 31 acres.

=== Arizona ===
- Surf City (1965), Tucson, Arizona. Asserted to be first skatepark in the world Operated by Arizona Surf City Enterprises, Inc., it had concrete ramps.

=== California ===
- Carlsbad Skatepark (1976), Carlsbad. California's first skatepark. Home of World Skateboard Championships on April 10, 1977. Operated until 1979, then buried, then destroyed in 2005. The current Carlsbad Skatepark is elsewhere.
- Pier Avenue Junior High School skatepark (1999), Hermosa Beach. Opened by the city, a small skatepark at the site of the first skateboard competition, which was organized by Dewey Weber across the street from his surf and skateboard shop. Makaha Skateboards was a sponsor of the competition. School is now a museum.
- etnies Skatepark, Lake Forest – Largest free skatepark in California. 62,000 square feet (5,800 m^{2}).
- Pacifica Skatepark – Pacifica, San Francisco Bay Area. Built after consultation with Tony Hawk.
- Pedlow Skate Park – Encino, California great for pool skating, more than 12,000 square feet (1,100 m^{2}).
- Santa Maria Skate Park – Fletcher Park. 700 Southside Pkwy, Santa Maria, California.
- The Palm Springs Skatepark contains a replica of the Nude Bowl, which is the most popular feature in the park.

=== Colorado ===
- Denver Skatepark

=== Connecticut ===
- CT Bike (1987), Bristol, Connecticut. All wooden indoor skate park, still in business today, despite a 1988 fire, operated by same family. Where Tony Hawk "made his debut when he was just a young boy on his first East Coast tour."

=== Florida ===
- Kona Skatepark in Jacksonville, Florida. One of few private parks of the 1970s surviving.
- Bro Bowl – One of the last skateparks of the 70s, and one of the oldest skateparks in the U.S.; First public skatepark in Florida Tampa, Florida. Listed on the National Register of Historic Places
- Possum Creek – Gainesville, Florida.
- Skatepark of Tampa – Skatepark in Tampa and home of the annual Tampa Pro.

=== Iowa ===
- Davenport Skatepark – Davenport, Iowa.
- Lauridsen Skatepark – Des Moines, Iowa. The largest skatepark in the United States at 88,000 square feet. (8175 square meters)
- Knoxville Skatepark - 502 N Lincoln Street, Knoxville, Iowa 50138

=== Kentucky ===
- Louisville Extreme Park – Louisville, Kentucky.

=== Maryland ===
- Ocean Bowl Skate Park (1976), Ocean City, Maryland, first on East Coast, and oldest operating municipal skate park in the United States. Renovated/rebuilt in 1997–98.

=== Montana ===
- Billings Downtown Skatepark (2004), Billings, Montana

=== New Jersey ===
- Berry Lane Skatepark, Jersey City. Reopened in 2020 as a part of Berry Lane Park's renovation.
- Seven Presidents, Long Branch. Rebuilt after Hurricane Sandy in 2015, opened back up in 2019, with plans to include outdoor workout equipment.
- Ocean City Skatepark, Ocean City.
- Neptune Skatepark, Neptune. Added a pump track to the park in 2022.
- Castle Point, Hoboken.

=== New Mexico ===
- Alamosa Skatepark Environment, Albuquerque, New Mexico.

=== Ohio ===
- Skatopia – Anarchist Skatepark in Rutland, Ohio
- The Flow Skatepark (2001-2013), Columbus. Was a world-famous[1] skatepark. At approximately 50,000 square feet (4,600 m^{2}), The Flow was one of the largest indoor skateparks in the nation. It was voted #1 skatepark in the United States by Fuel TV.

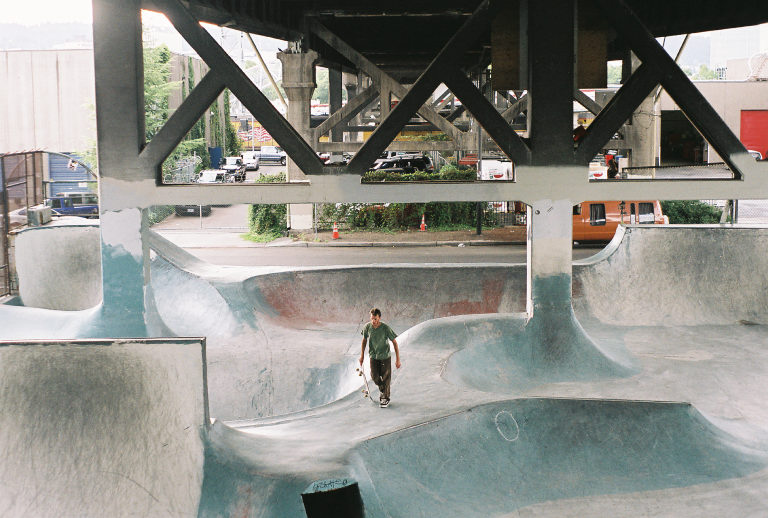
Portland skatepark

=== Oregon ===
- Burnside Skatepark, a do it yourself "barge build" beneath the Burnside Bridge in Portland, Oregon. The modern skatepark designs of the Pacific Northwest can be traced back to this. Skateboarders used an area populated primarily by the city's "undesirable elements" to create a skatepark, building one section at a time. The process is called "design/build" (D/B), and is a characteristic of many skateparks today. The design/build process ensures that adjacent skatepark features are harmonious and rideable, allowing skateboarders to create endless "lines" to ride among the many features. It Was featured in Tony Hawk video games and the movie Paranoid Park.
- Ashland Skate Park (1999), Ashland. It's a "rad and versatile" park. It was amidst some contention about families and surveillance cameras in 2018.

=== Pennsylvania ===
- FDR Skatepark – Philadelphia, Pennsylvania

=== Tennessee ===
- Concrete Wave Country – Nashville's first public skatepark.

=== Texas ===
- Lee and Joe Jamail Skatepark – 30,000-square-foot (2,800 m^{2}) in-ground public facility in Houston, Texas.

=== Virginia ===
8 Mount Trashmore Skatepark, in Virginia Beach (24,000 square feet (2,200 m^{2}))

=== Washington ===
- Edge Skatepark – Redmond, Washington
- A skatepark (1966), Kelso, Washington. For skateboarders and skaters, with plywood ramps, lighted for night use.

=== Wisconsin ===
- Turf Skatepark (1979), Milwaukee. Included five concrete pools in an indoor/outdoor facility (defunct since 1996).

to be processed

In more extreme climates, parks were built indoors, often using wood or metal. By the end of the 1970s, the popularity of skateboarding had waned, and the original parks of the era began to close. A downturn in the overall skateboard market in the 1980s, coupled with high liability insurance premiums, contributed to the demise of the first wave of skateparks. Some second-generation parks, such as Upland, California's Pipeline, survived into the 1980s. However, many public parks of that era can still be found throughout Western Europe, Australia and New Zealand.

== Gallery of Skateparks ==
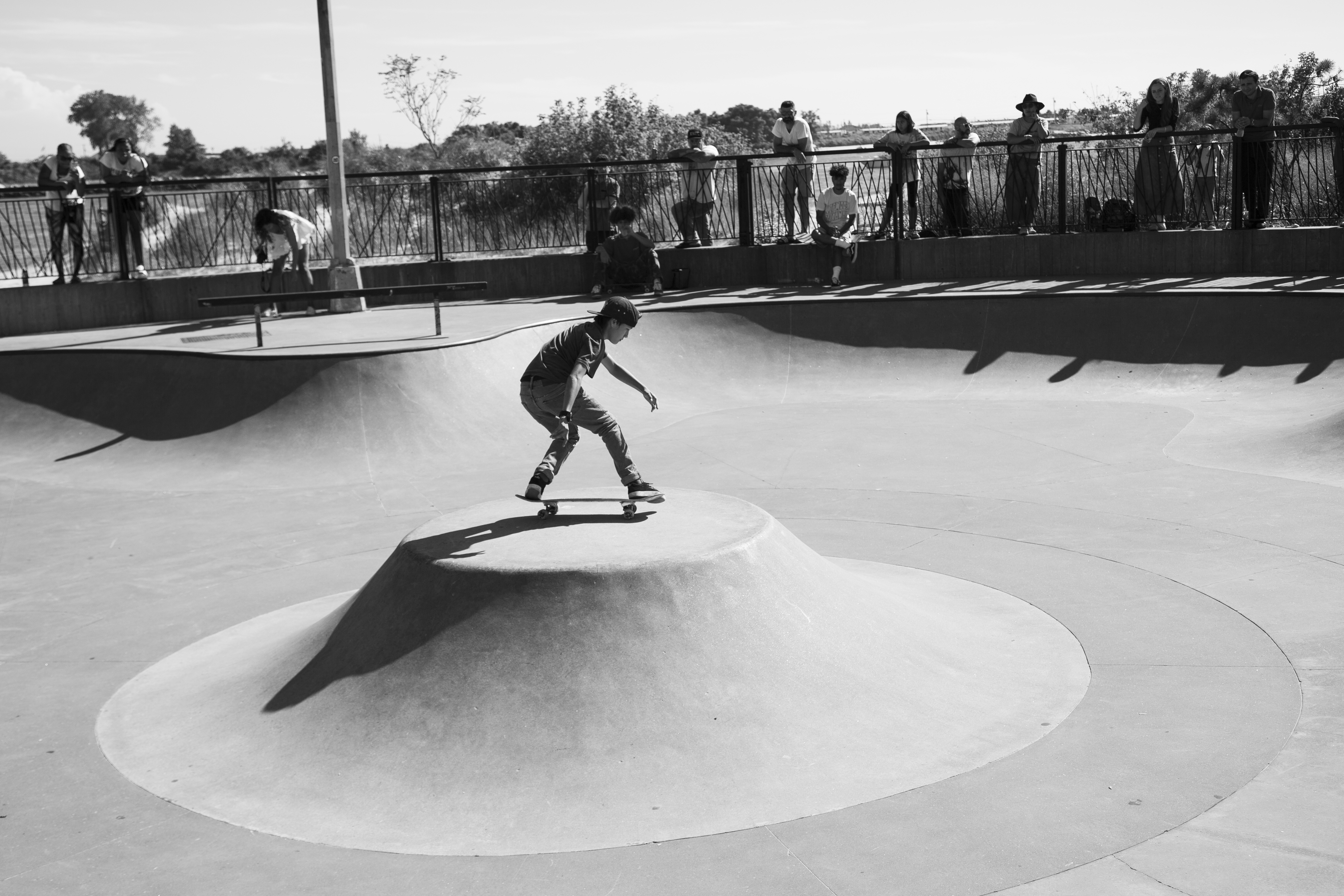

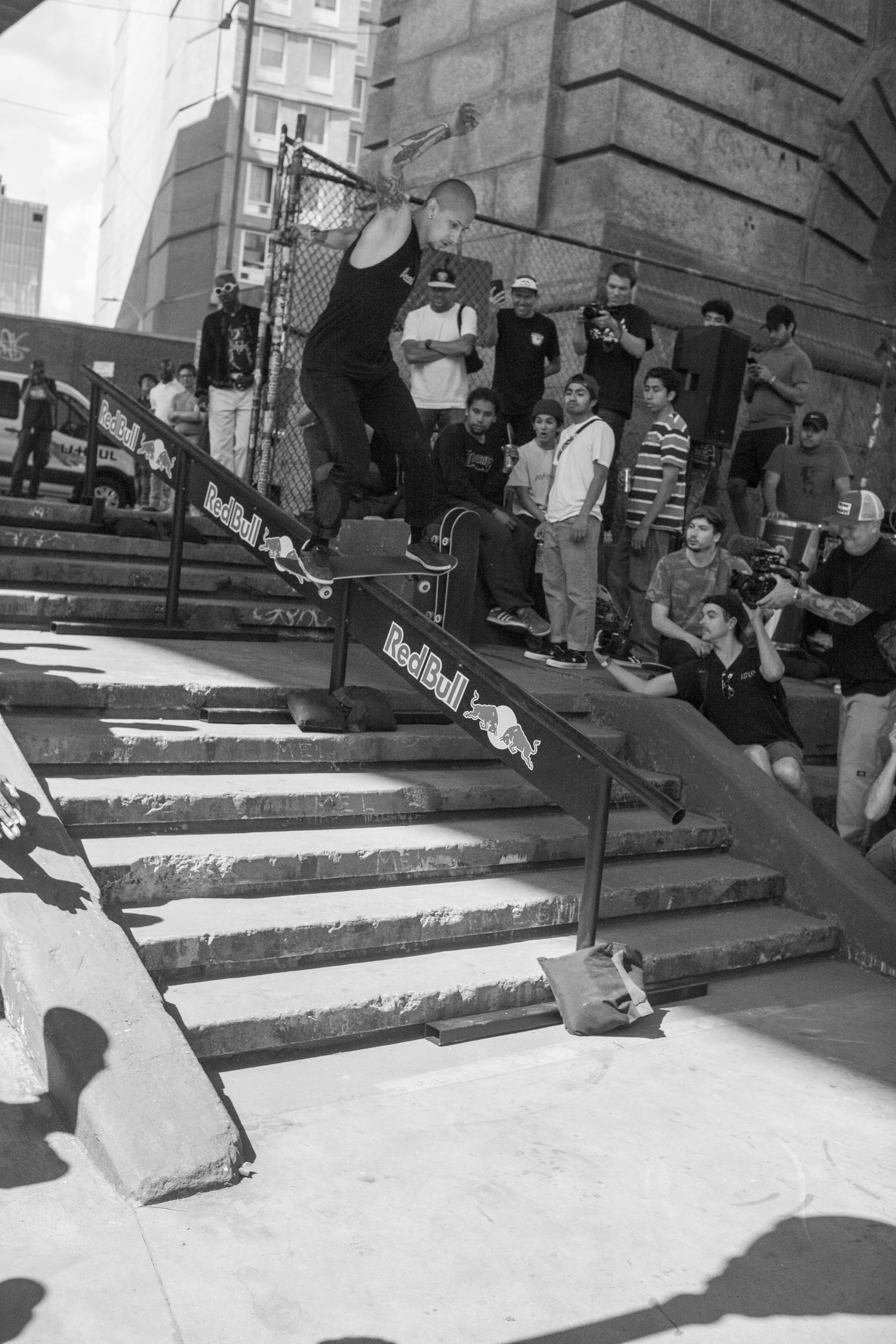

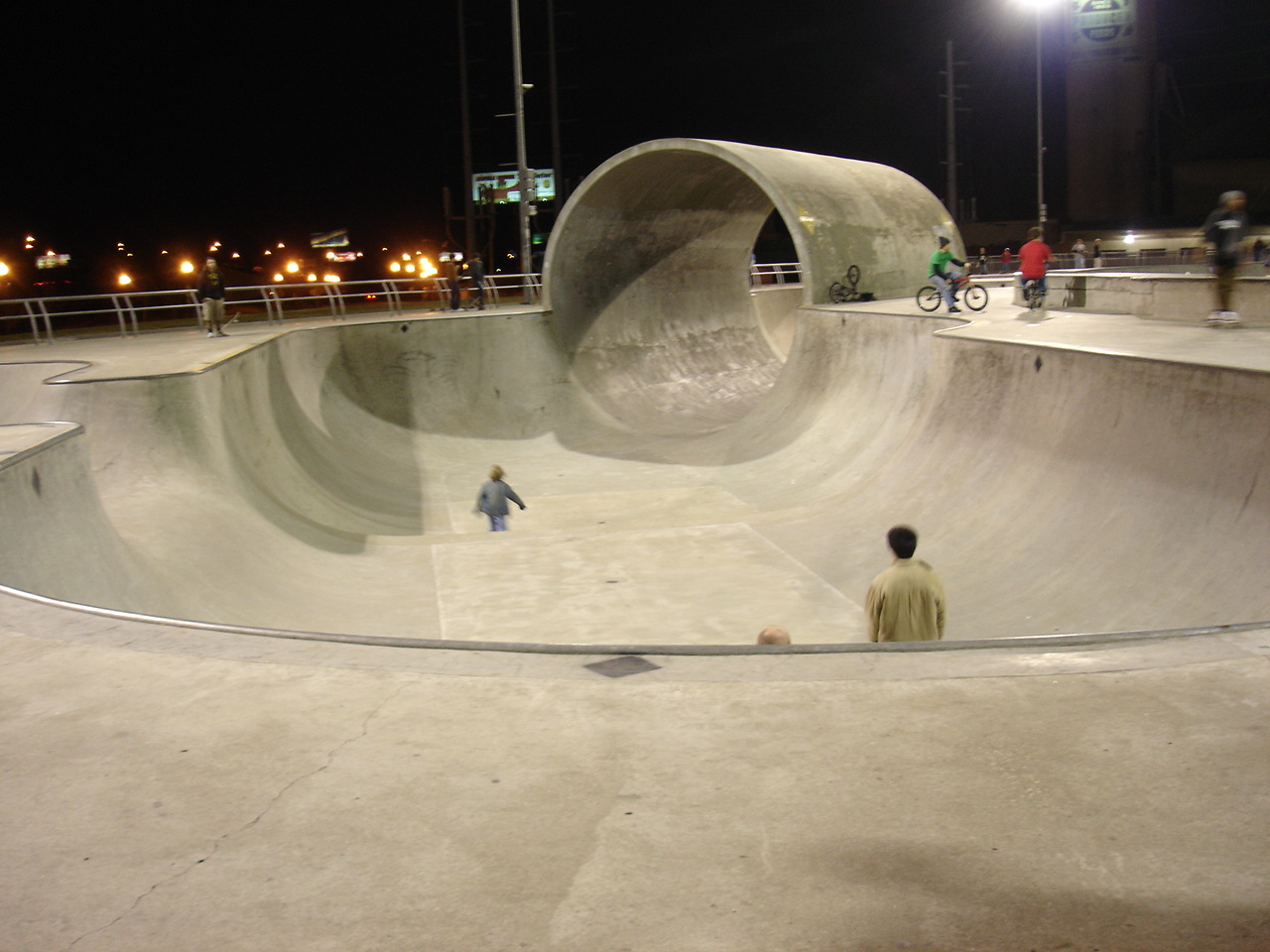

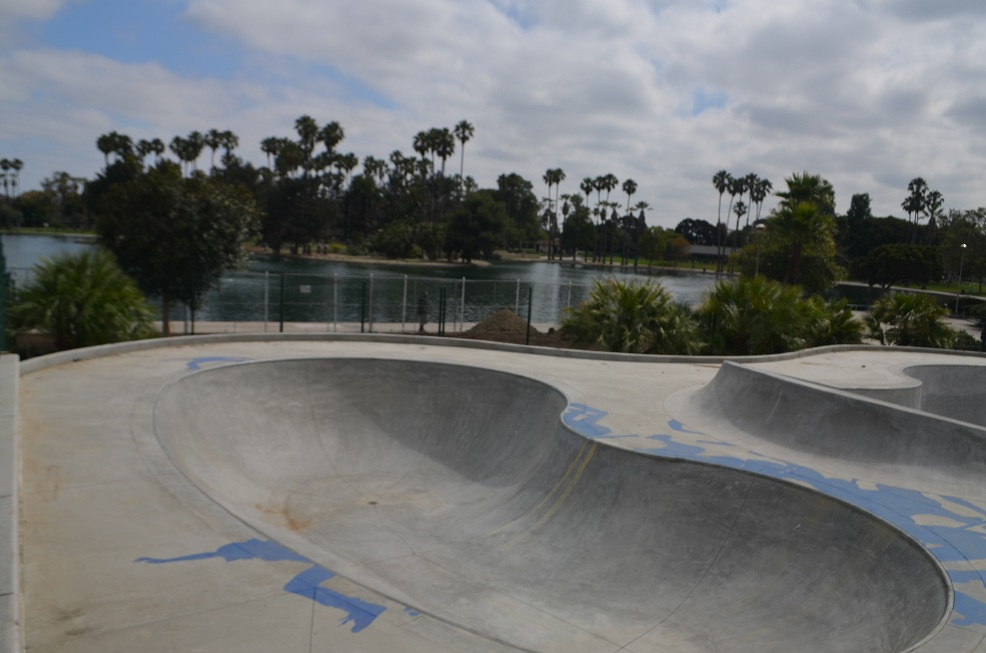

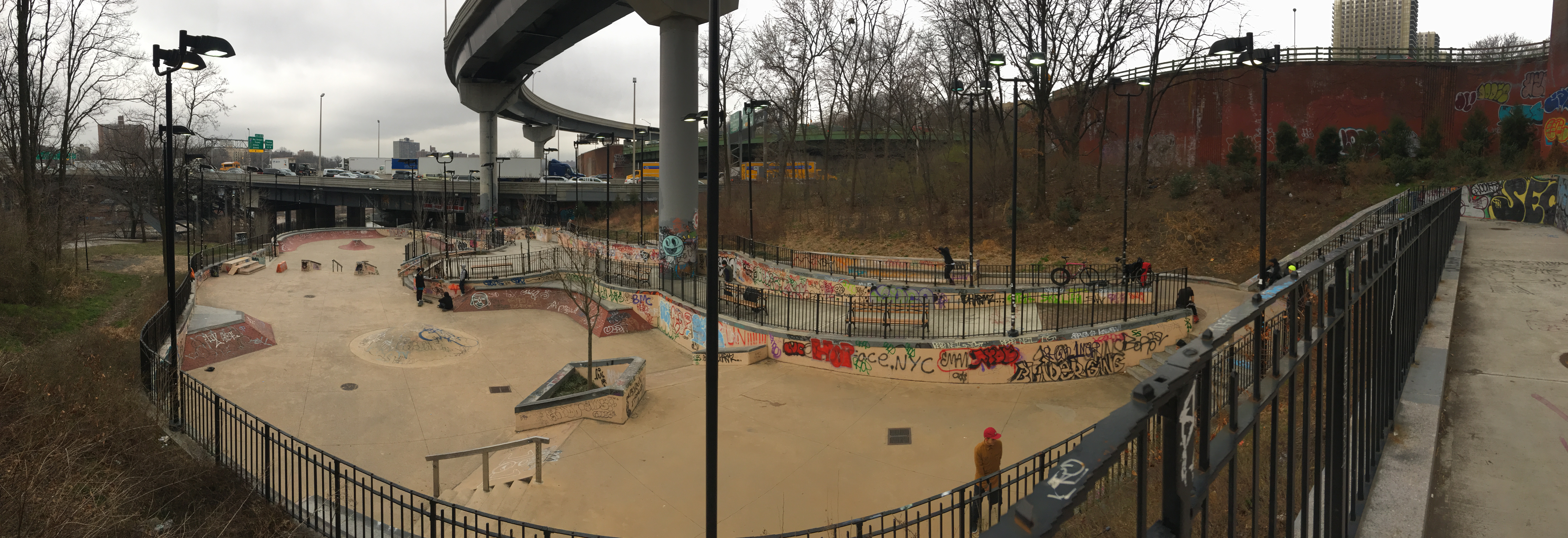

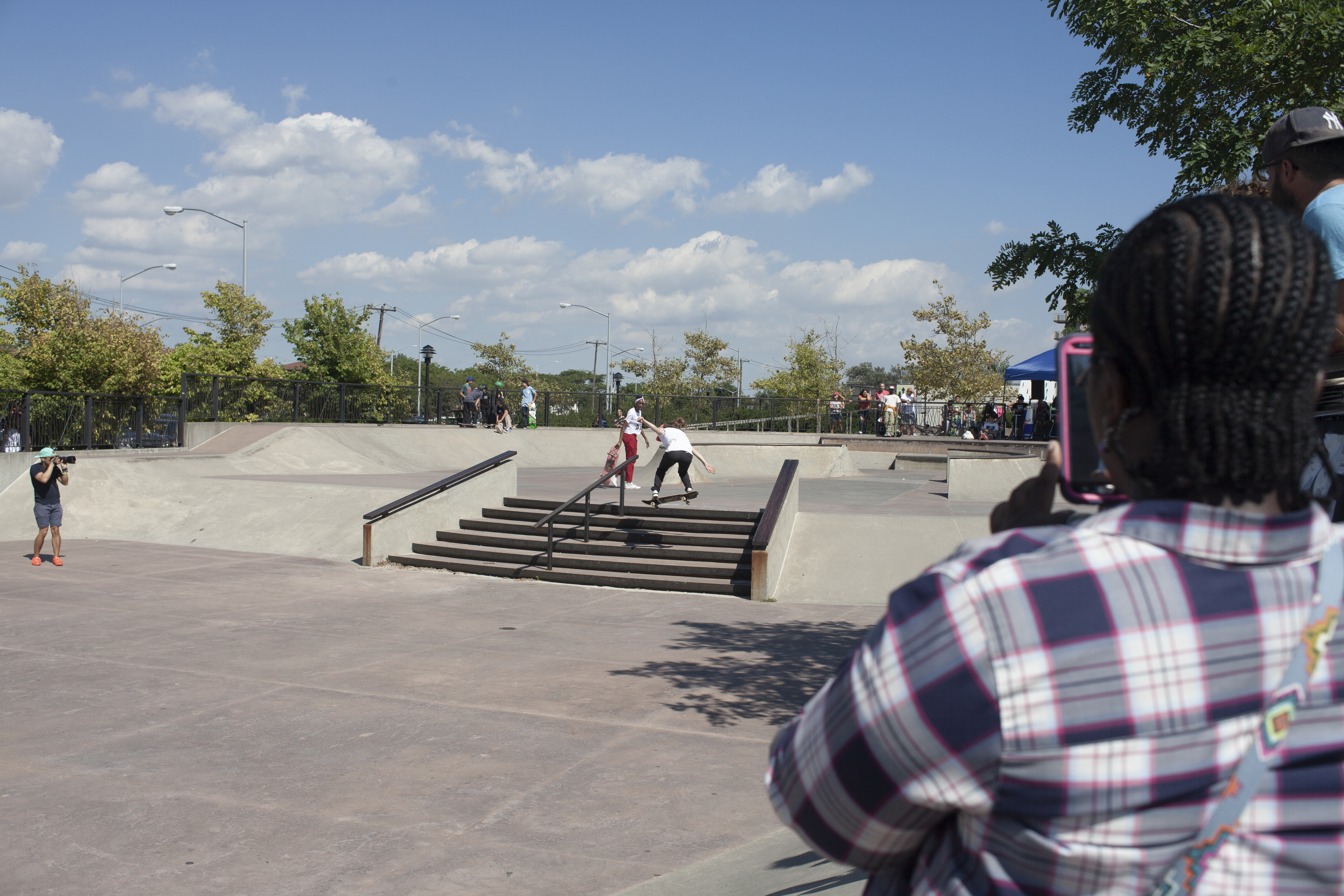

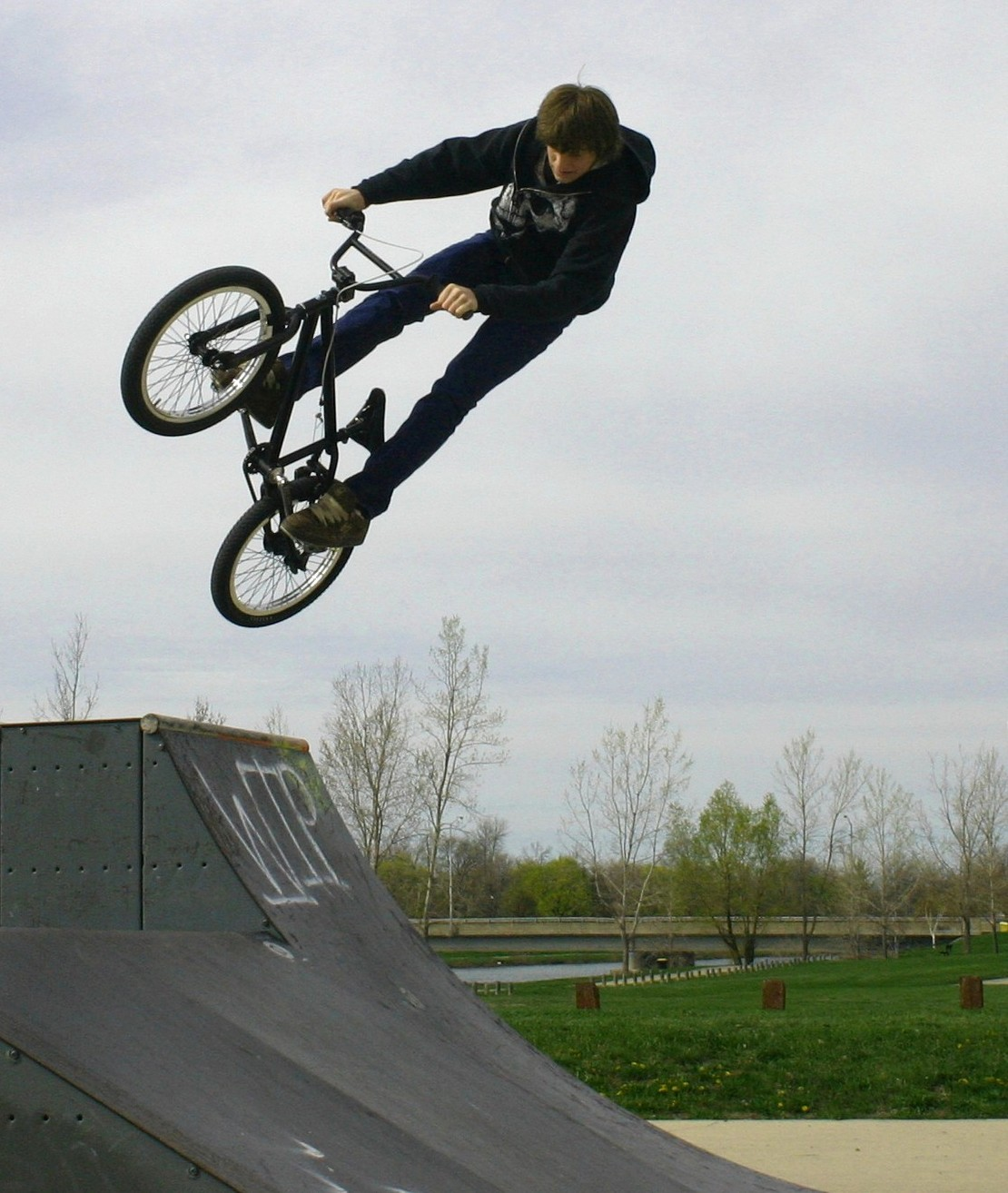

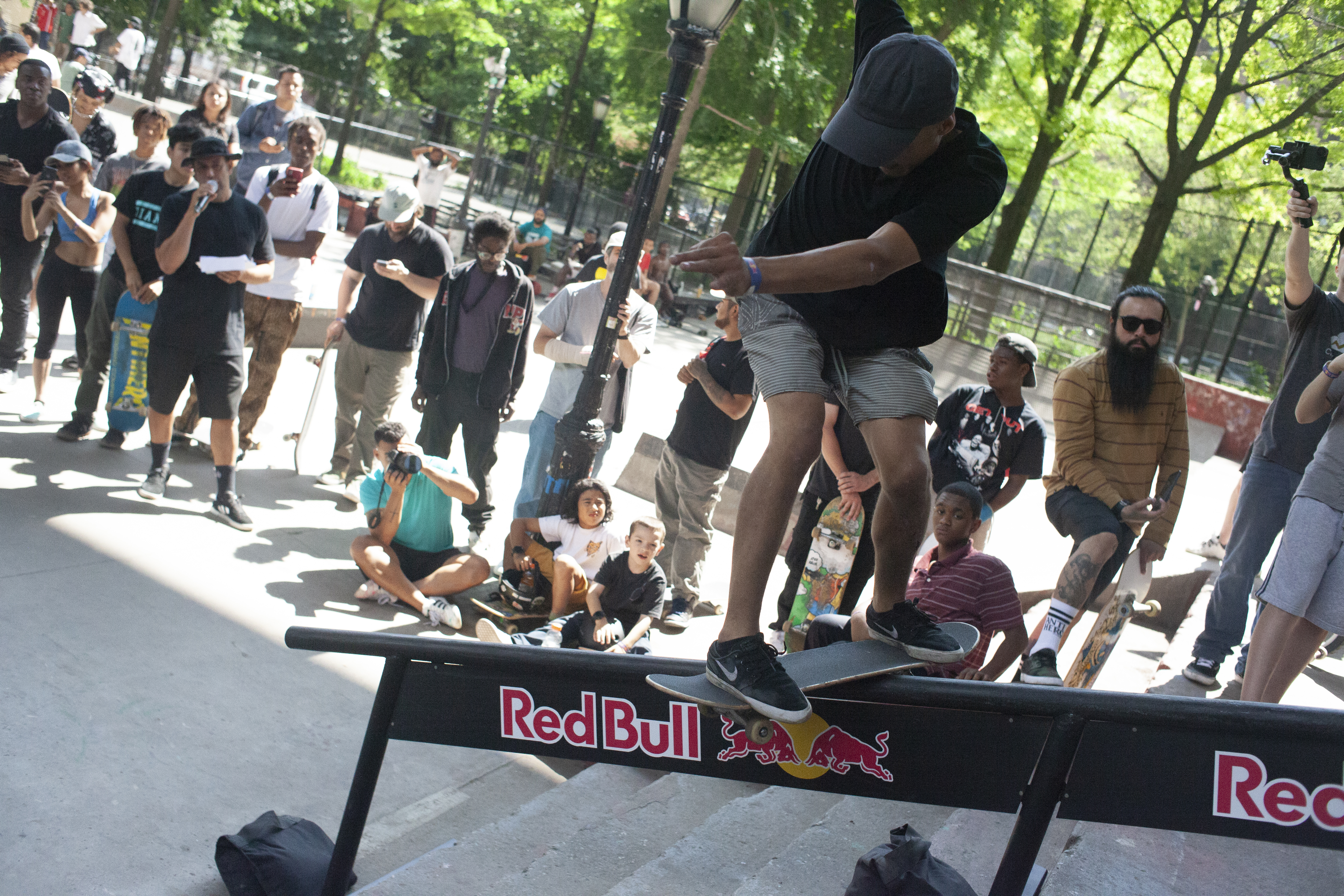

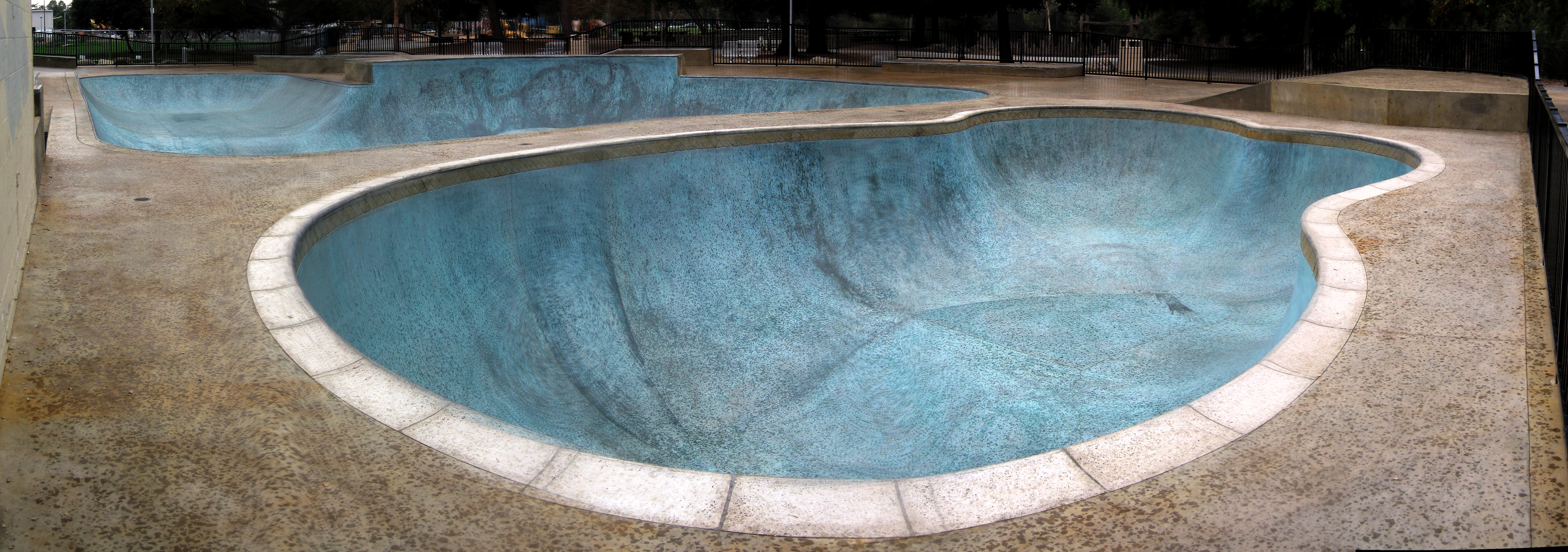

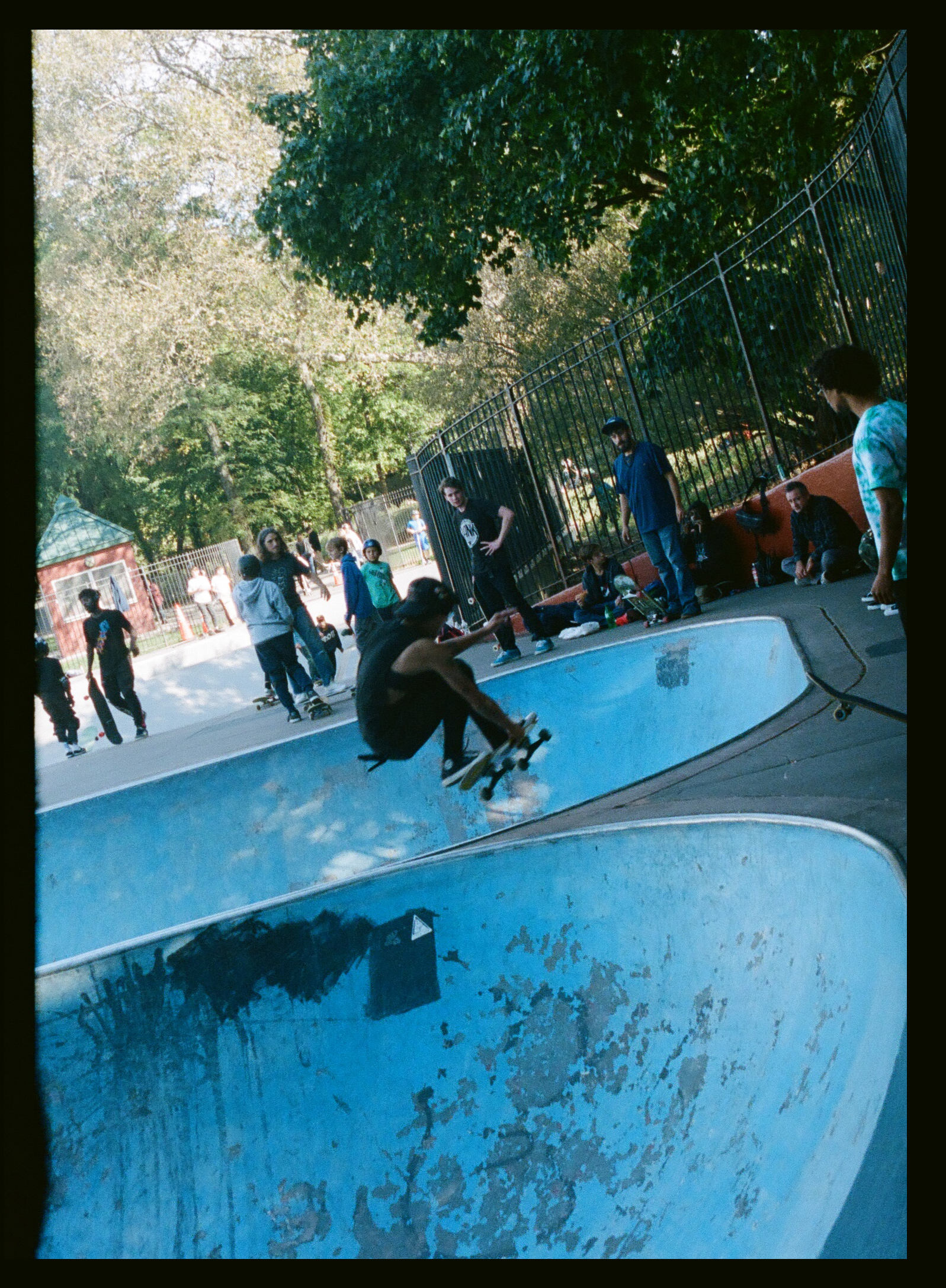

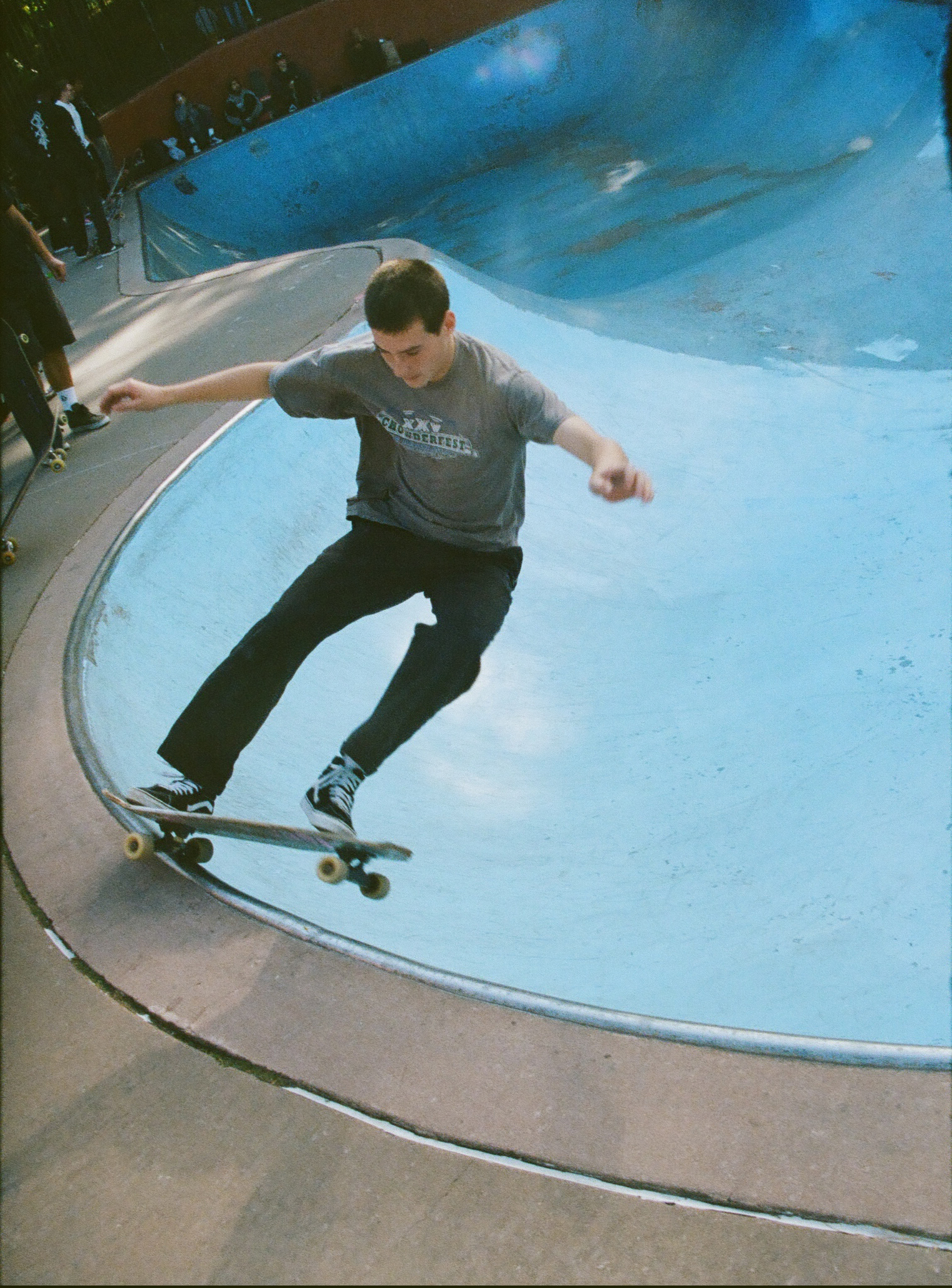

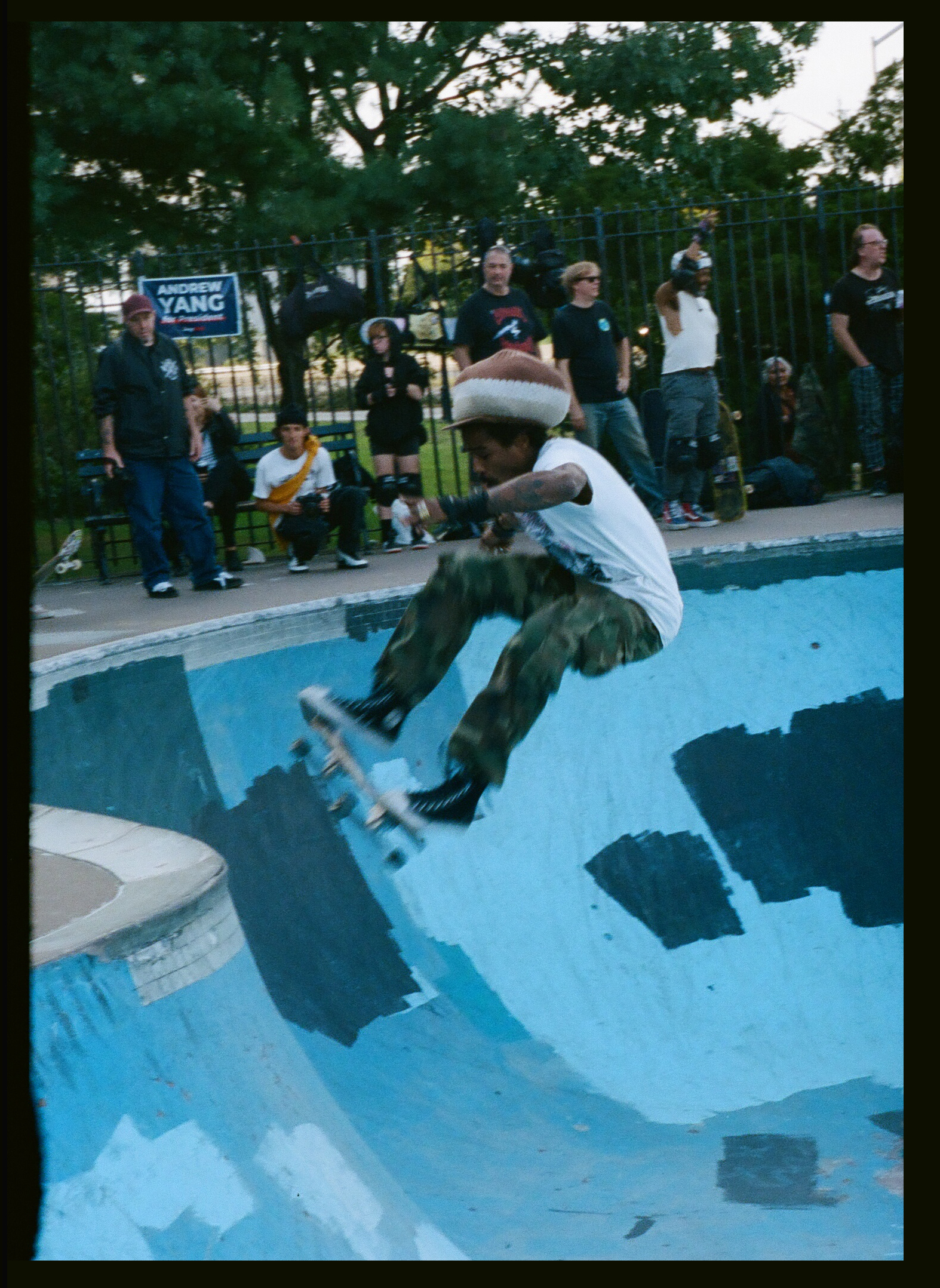

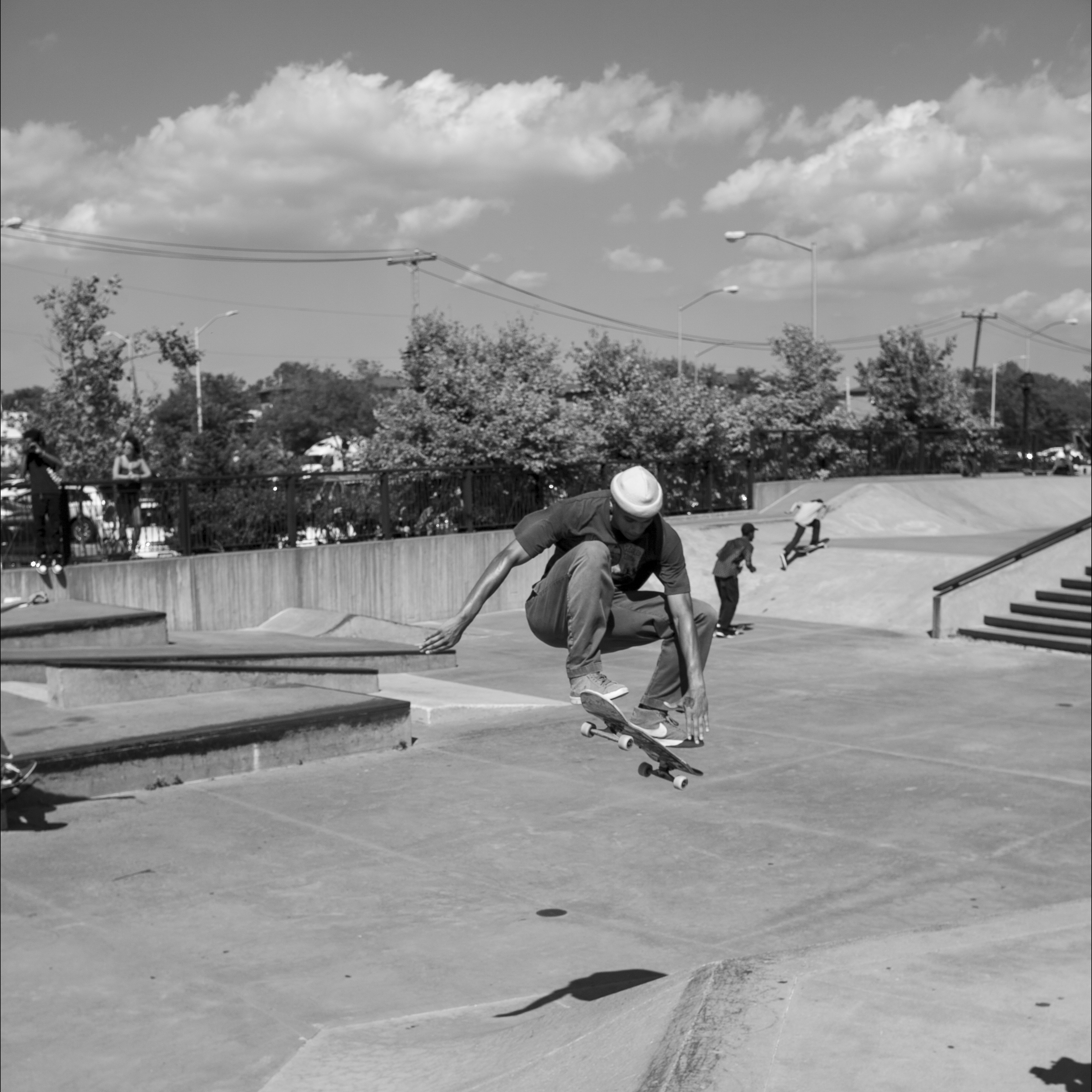

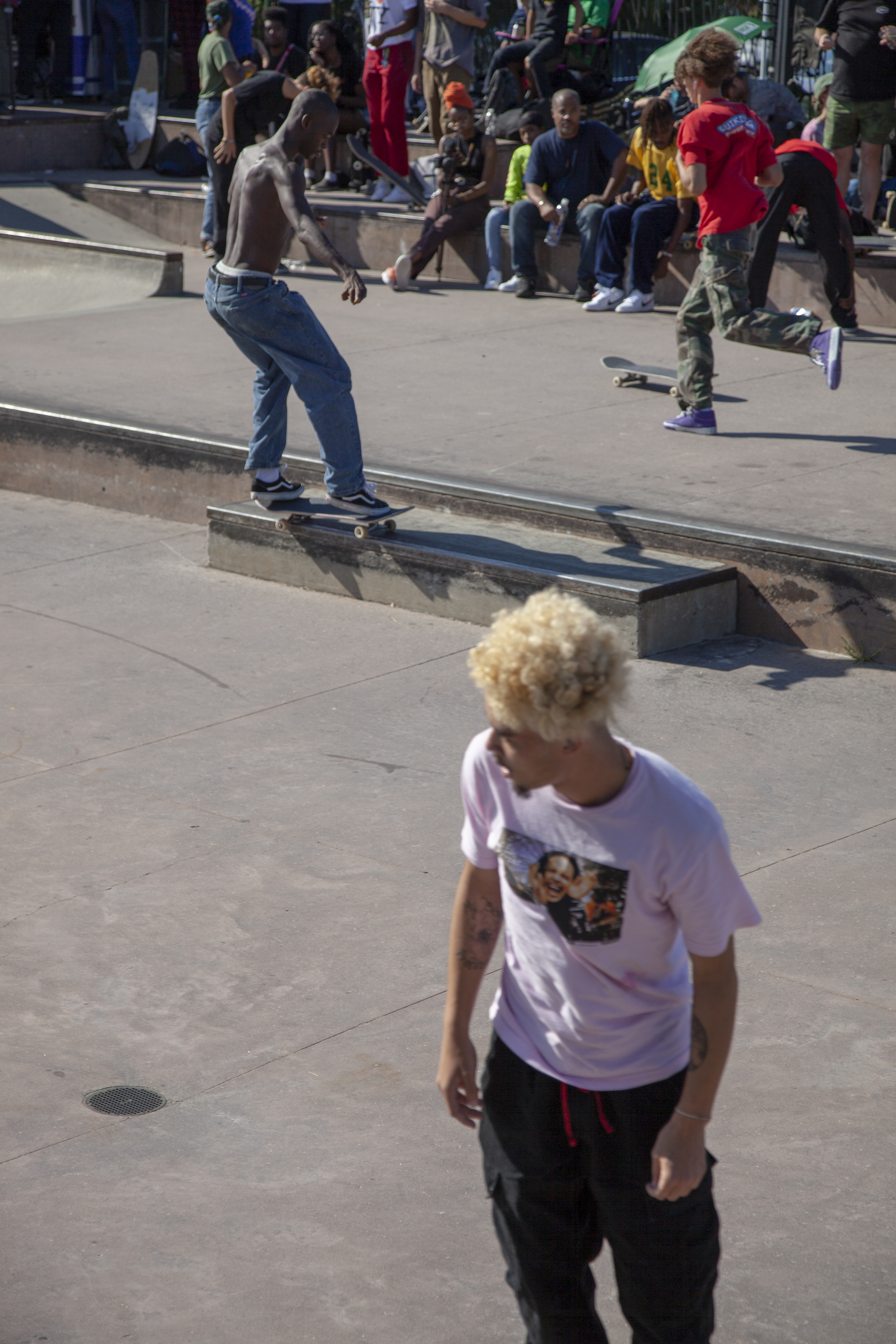

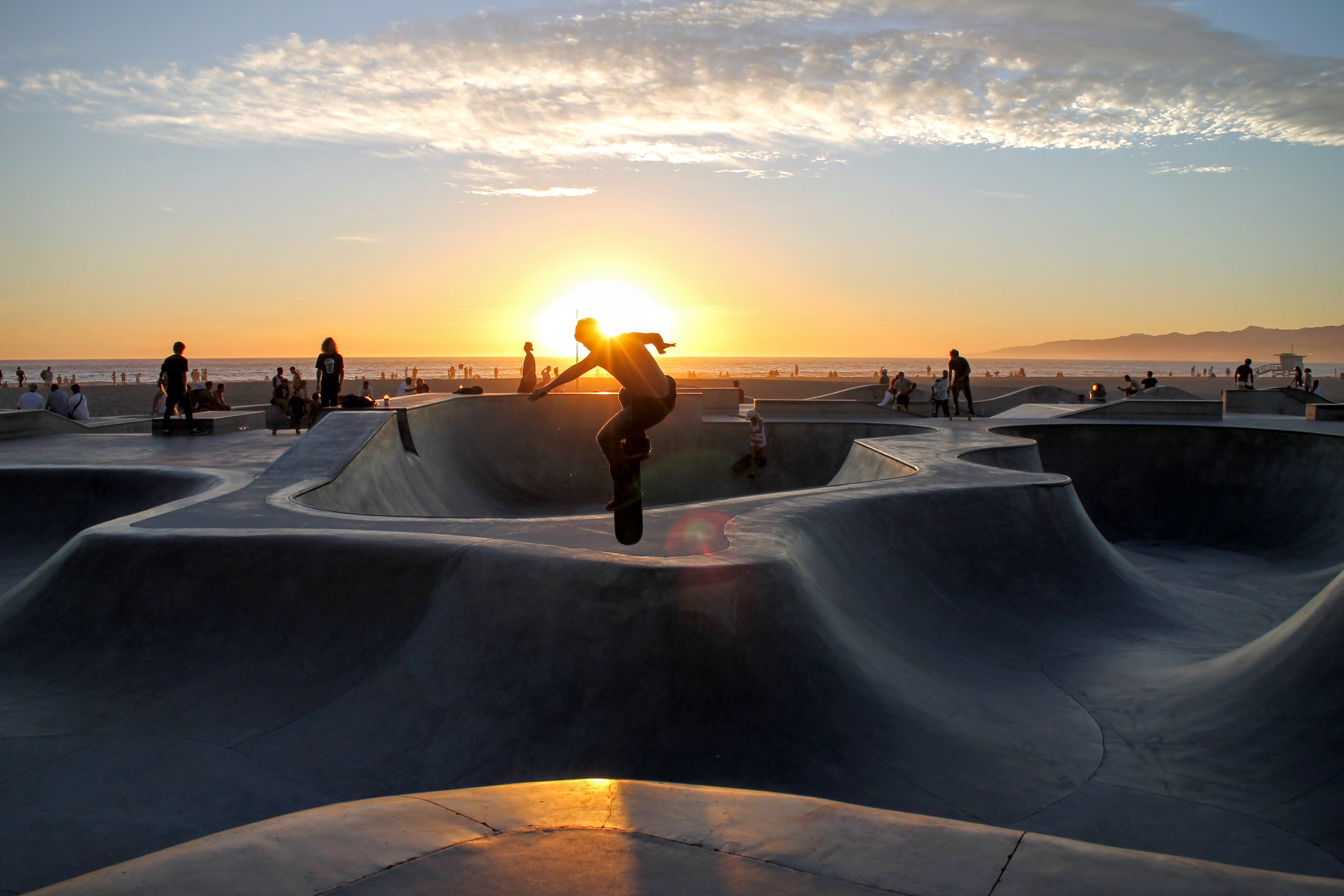

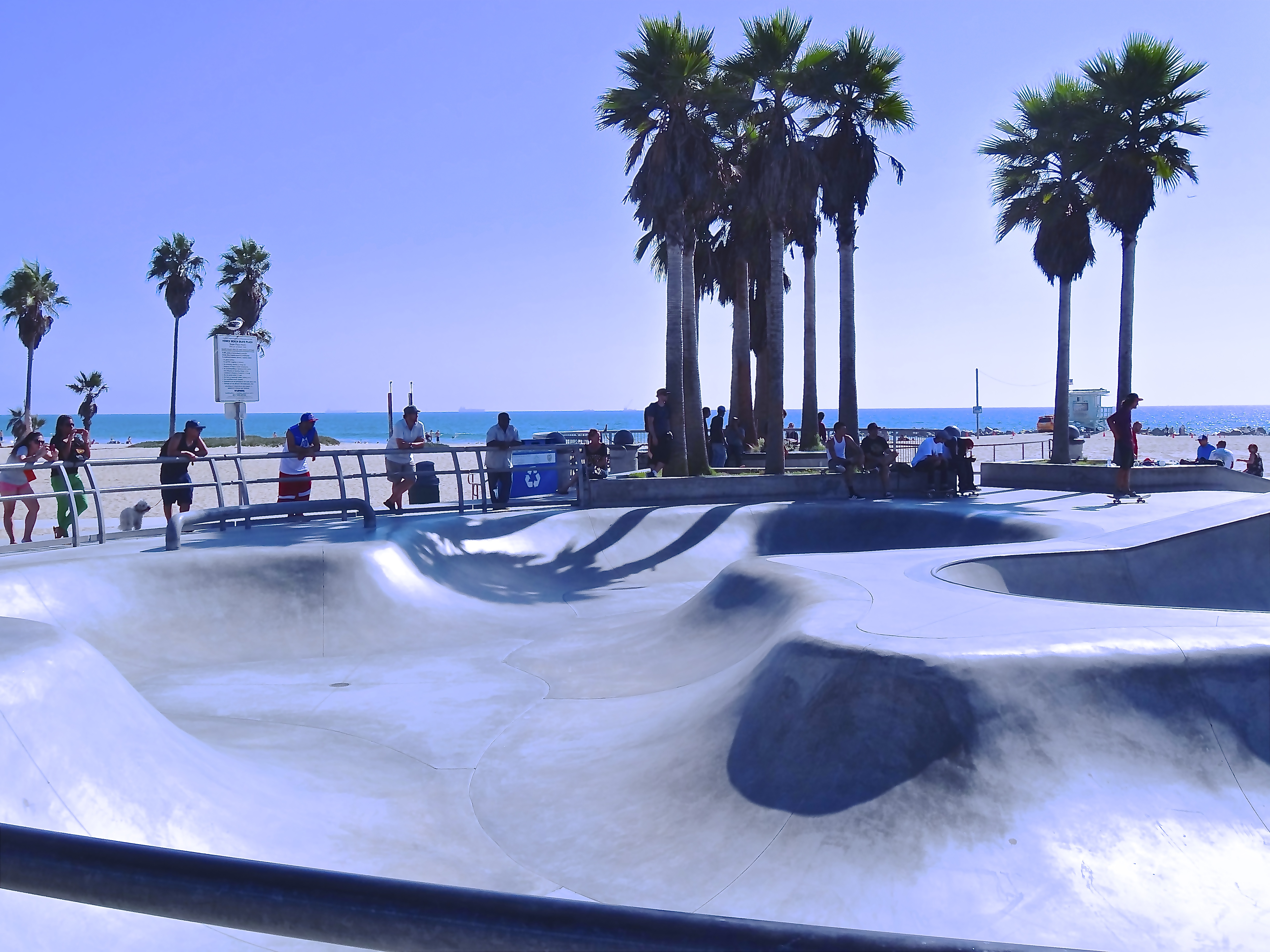

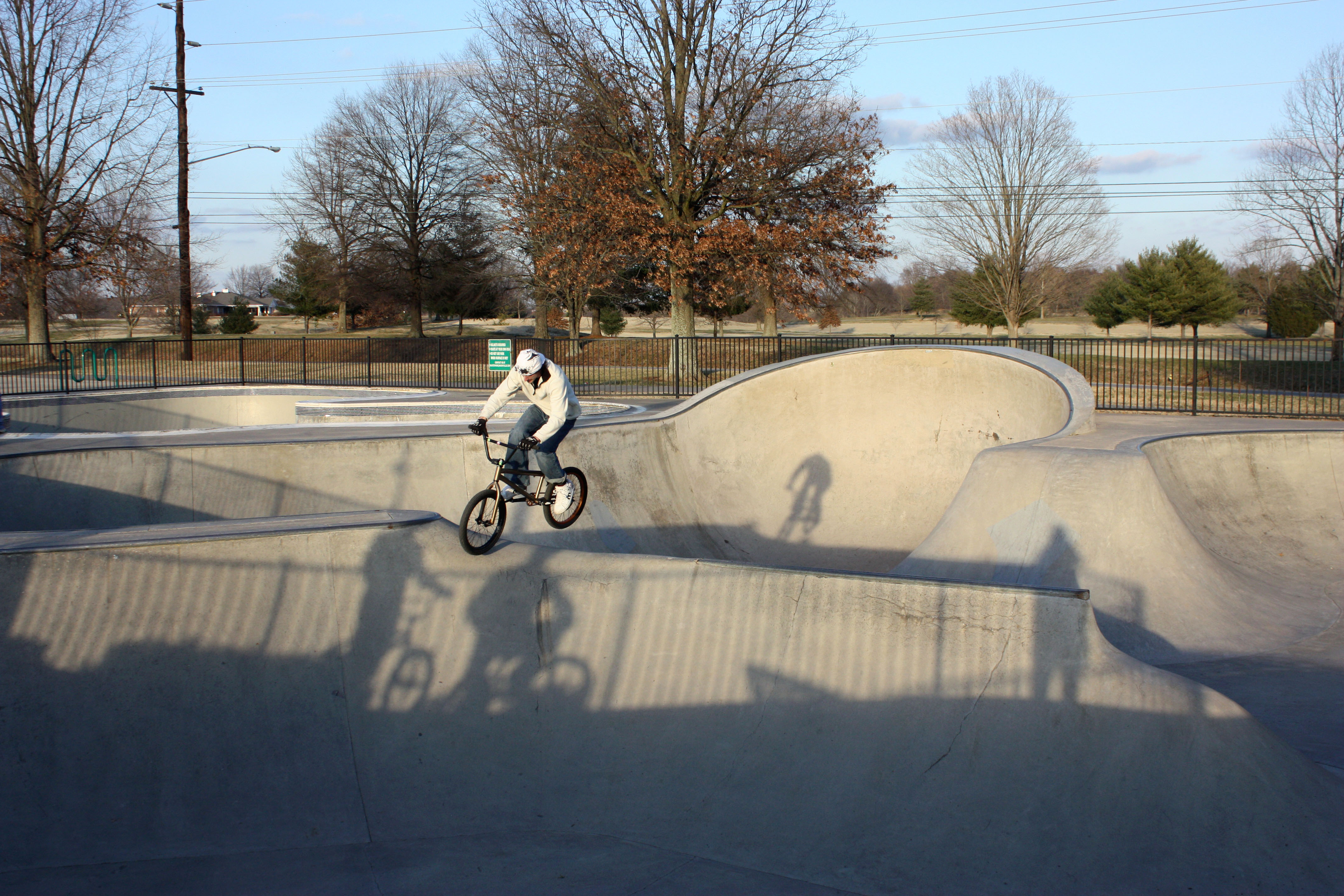

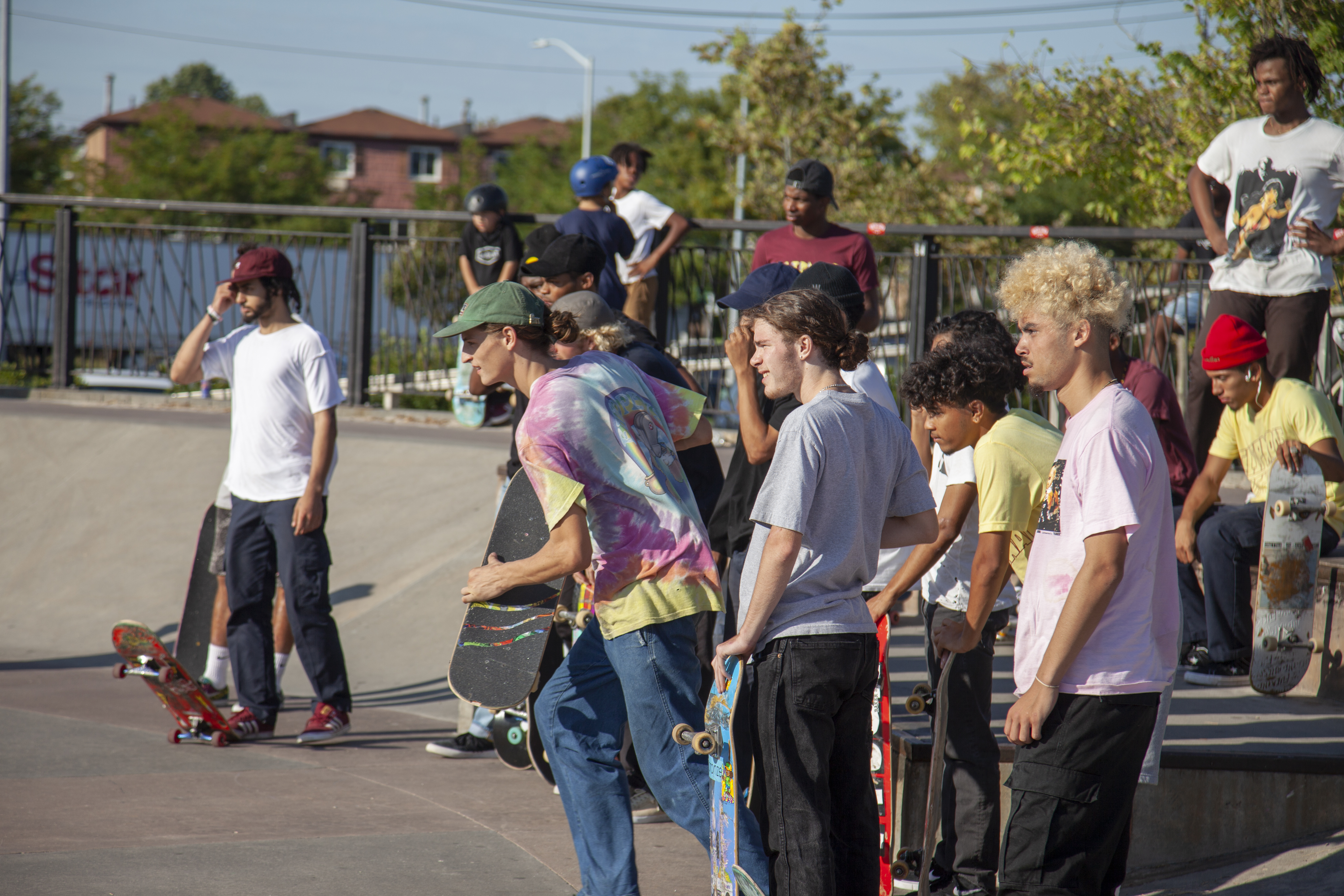

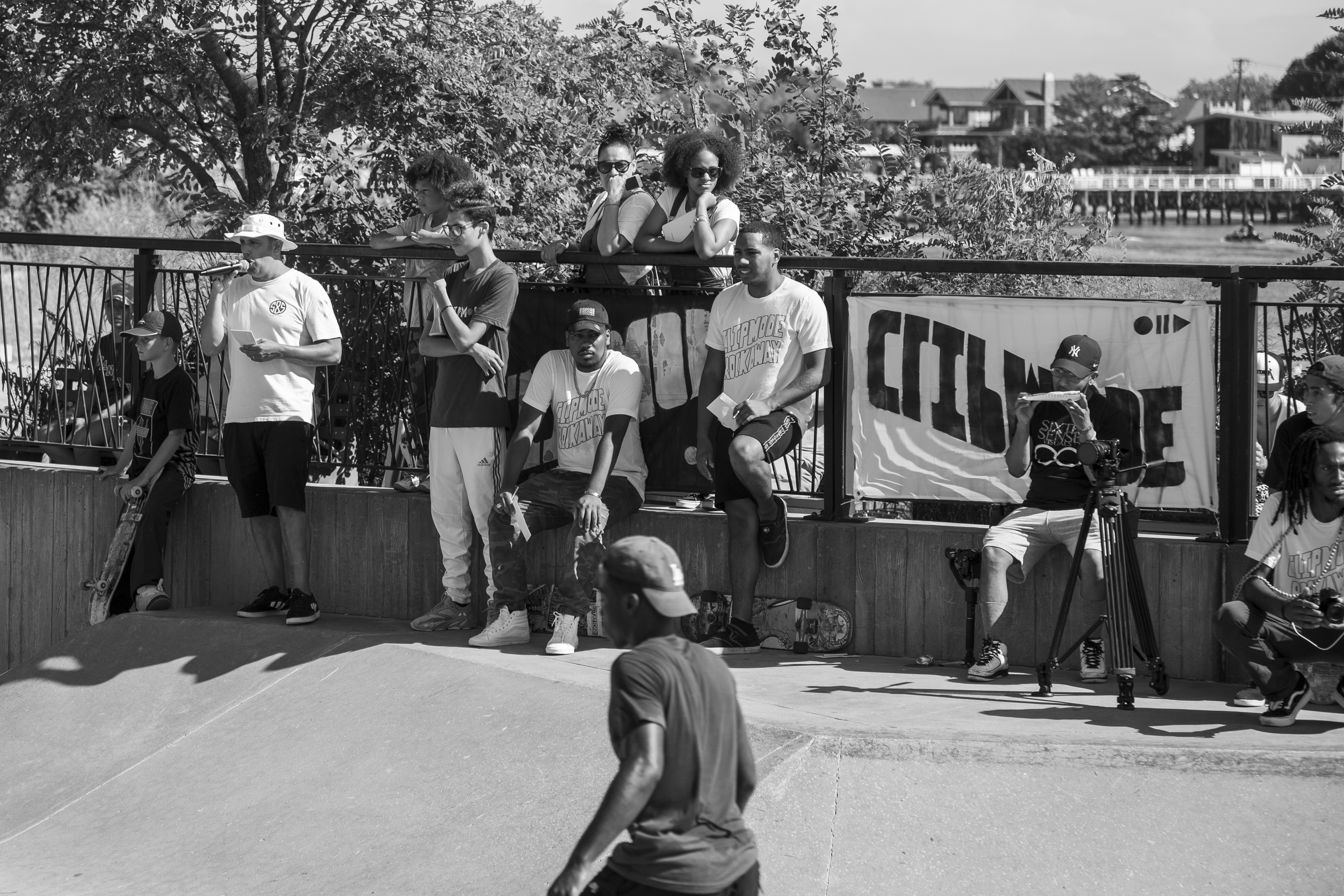

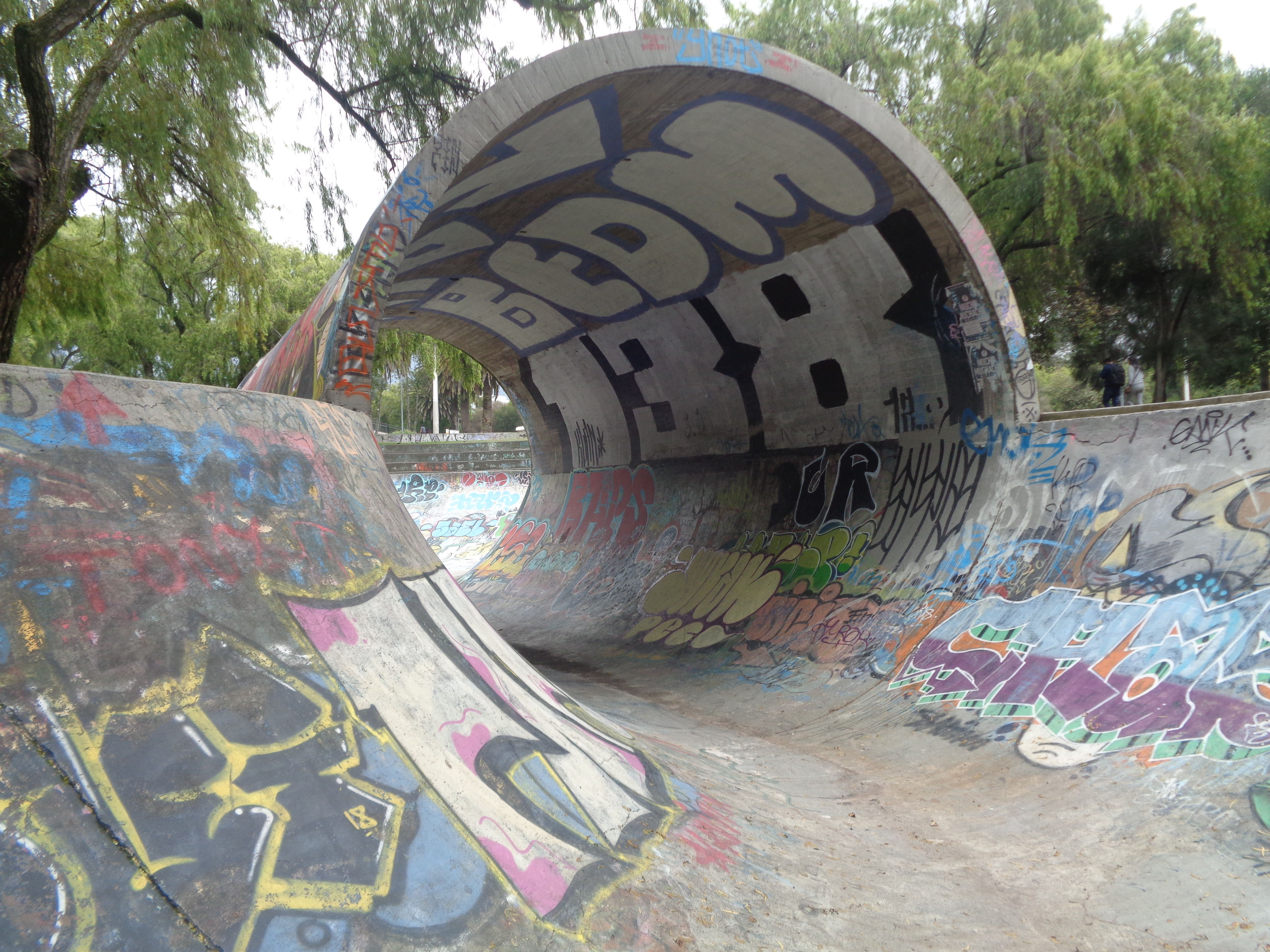

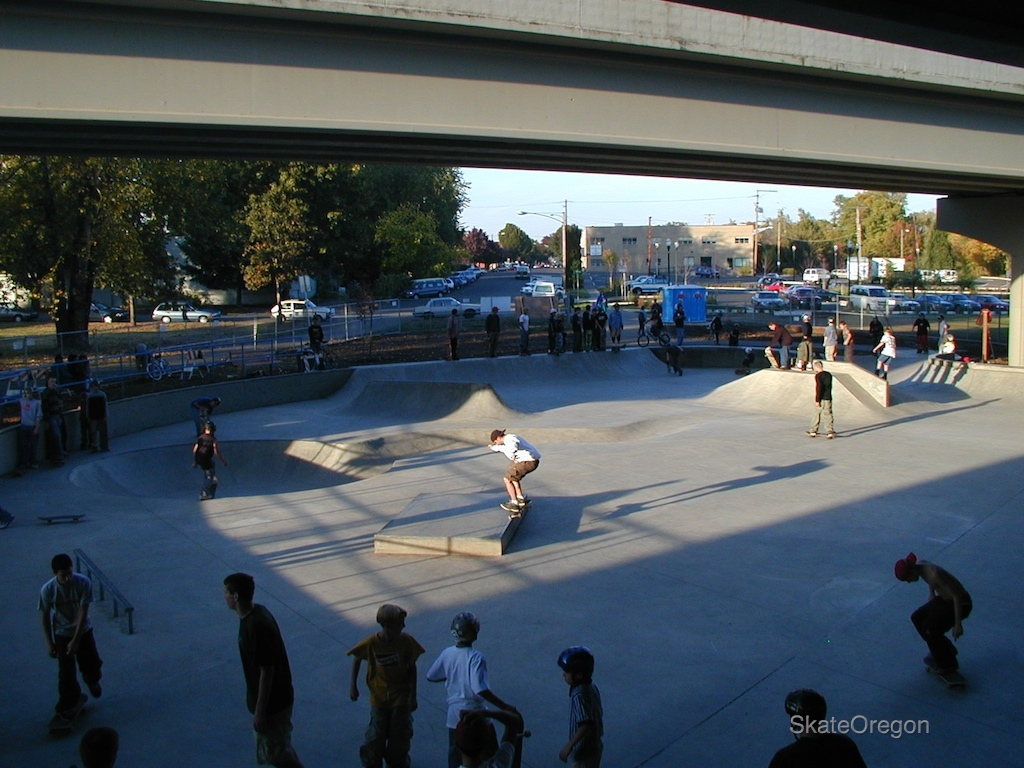

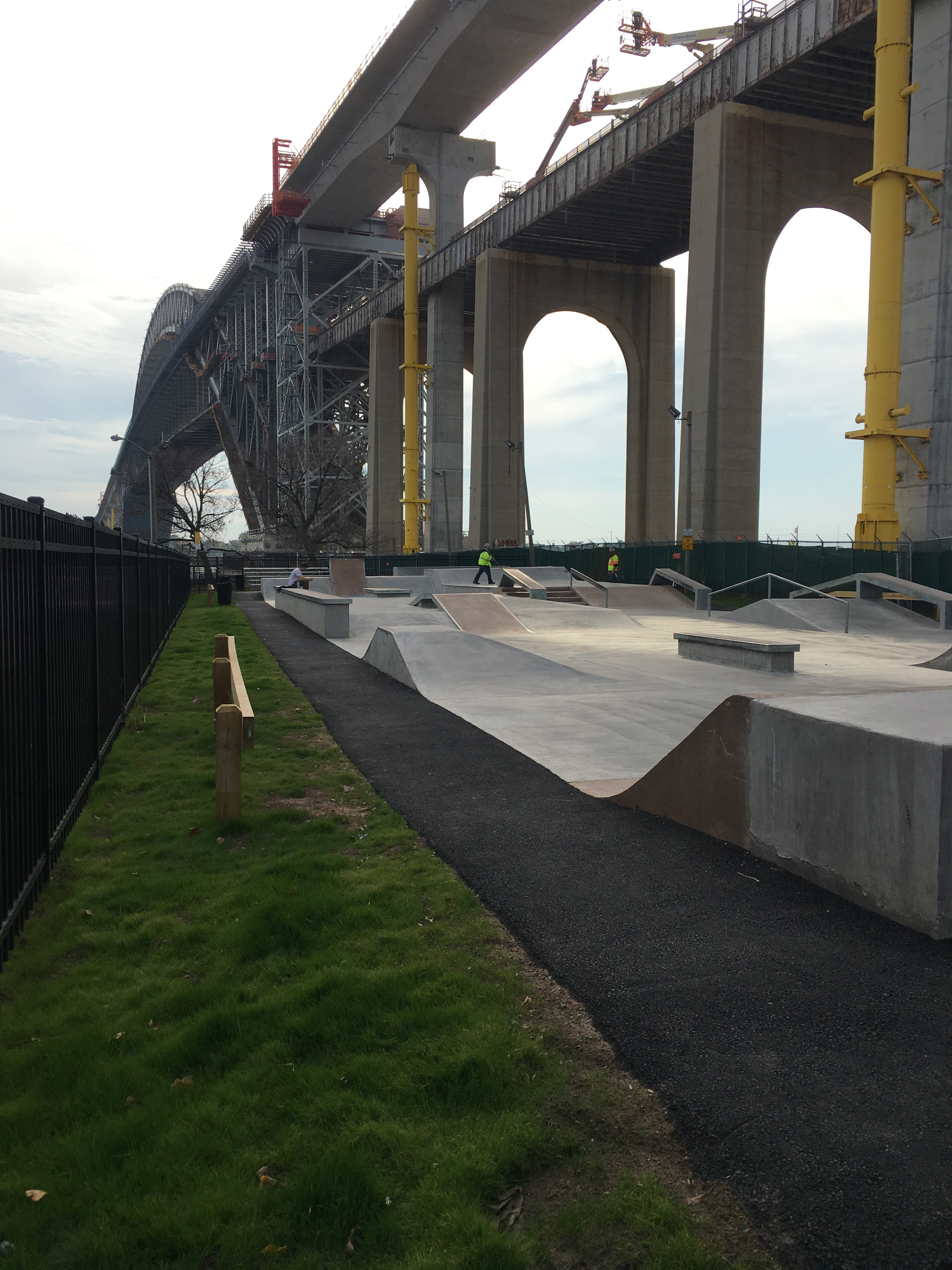

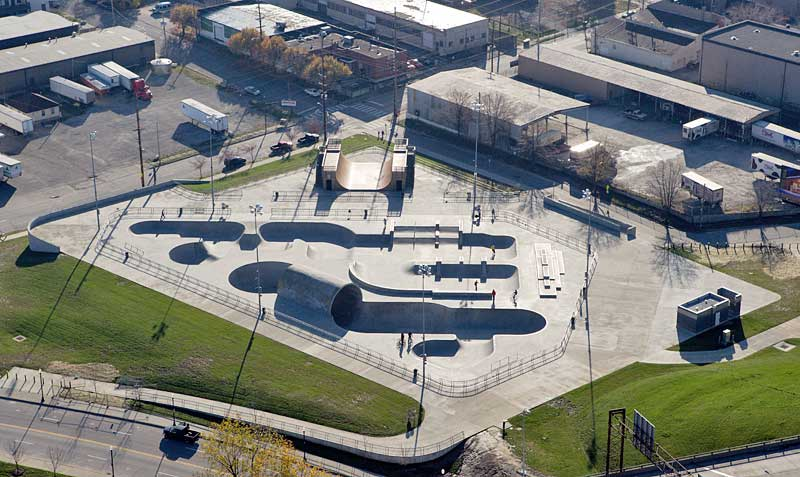

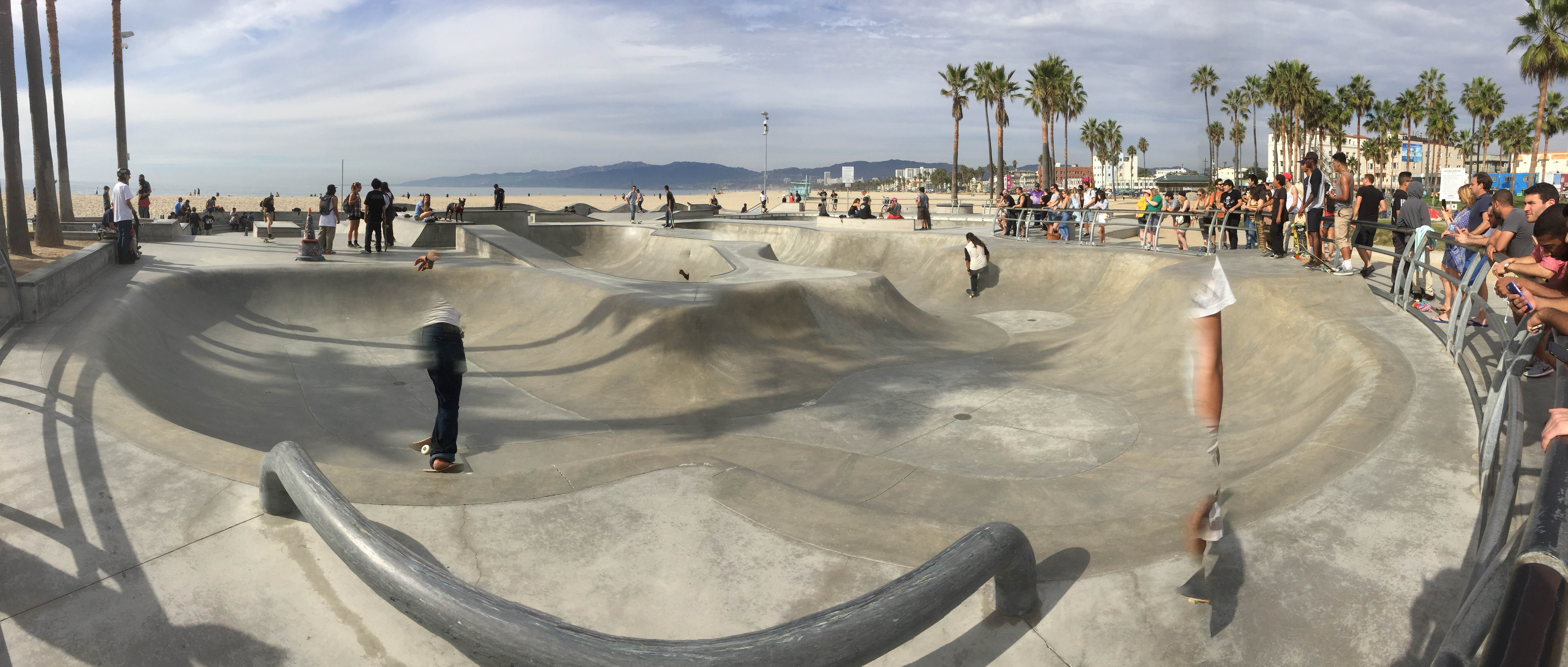

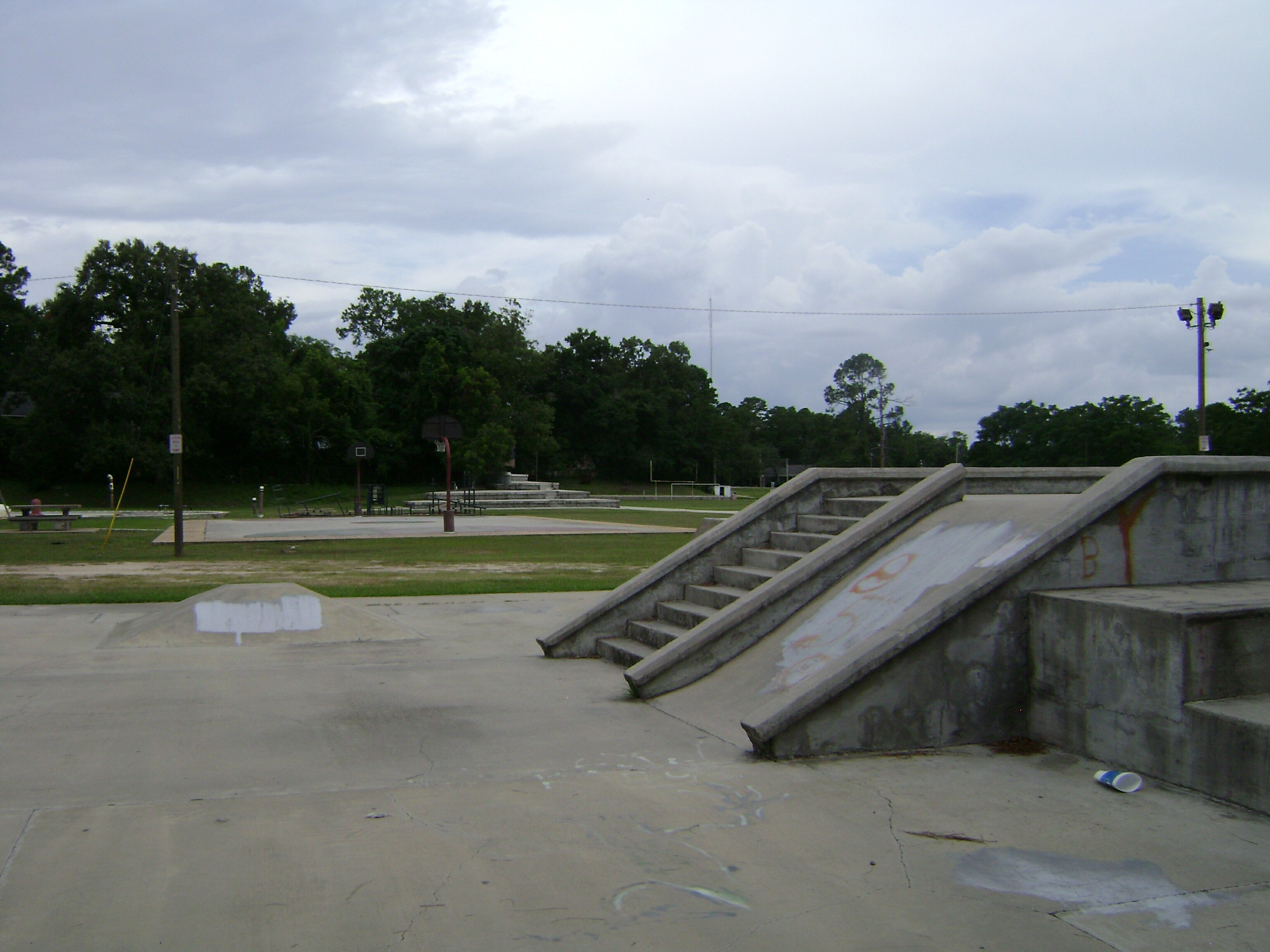

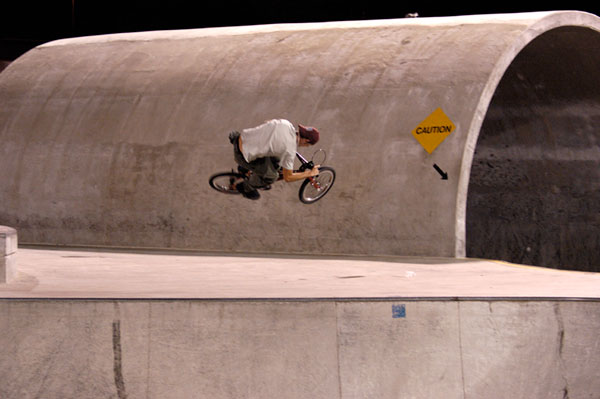

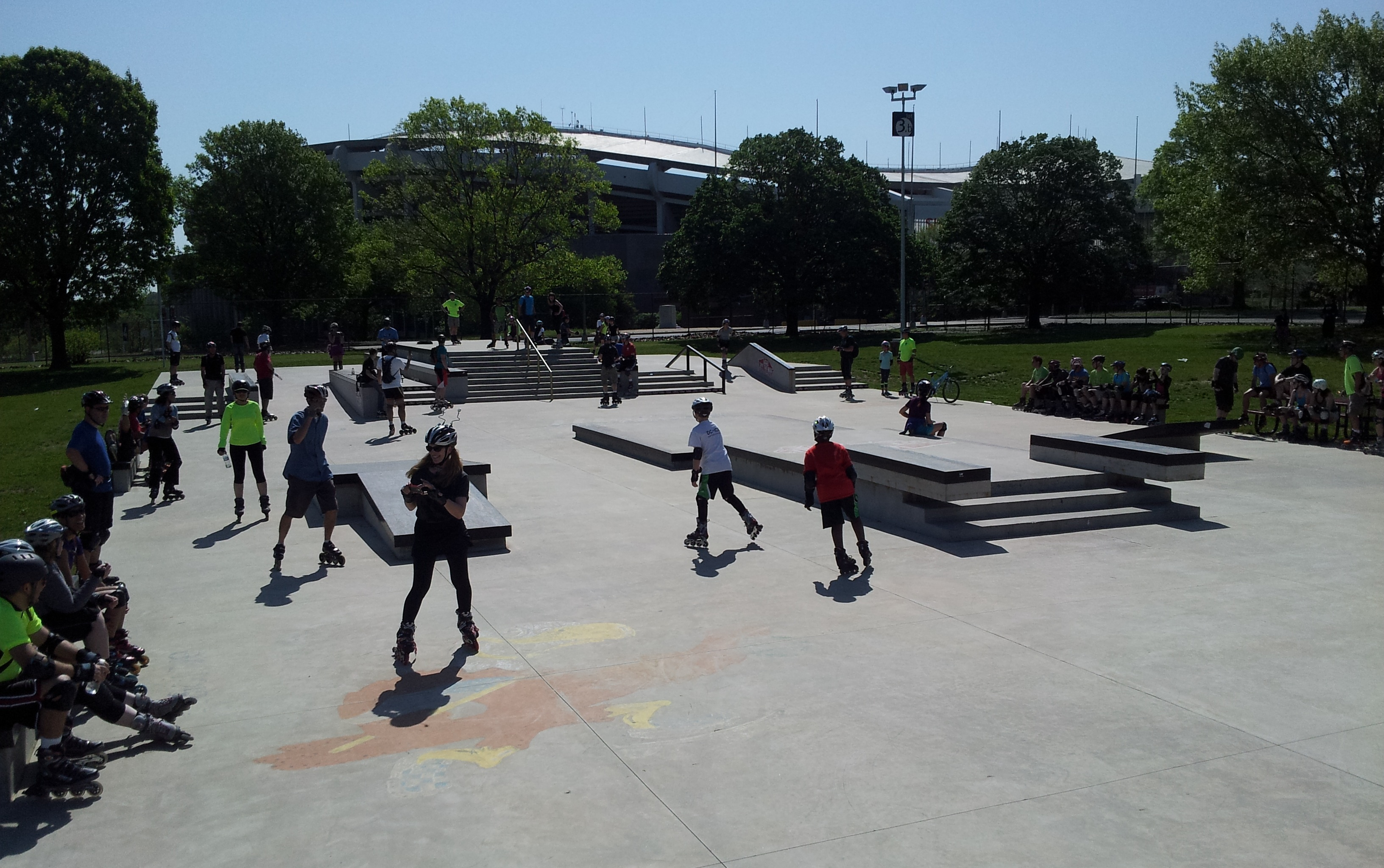

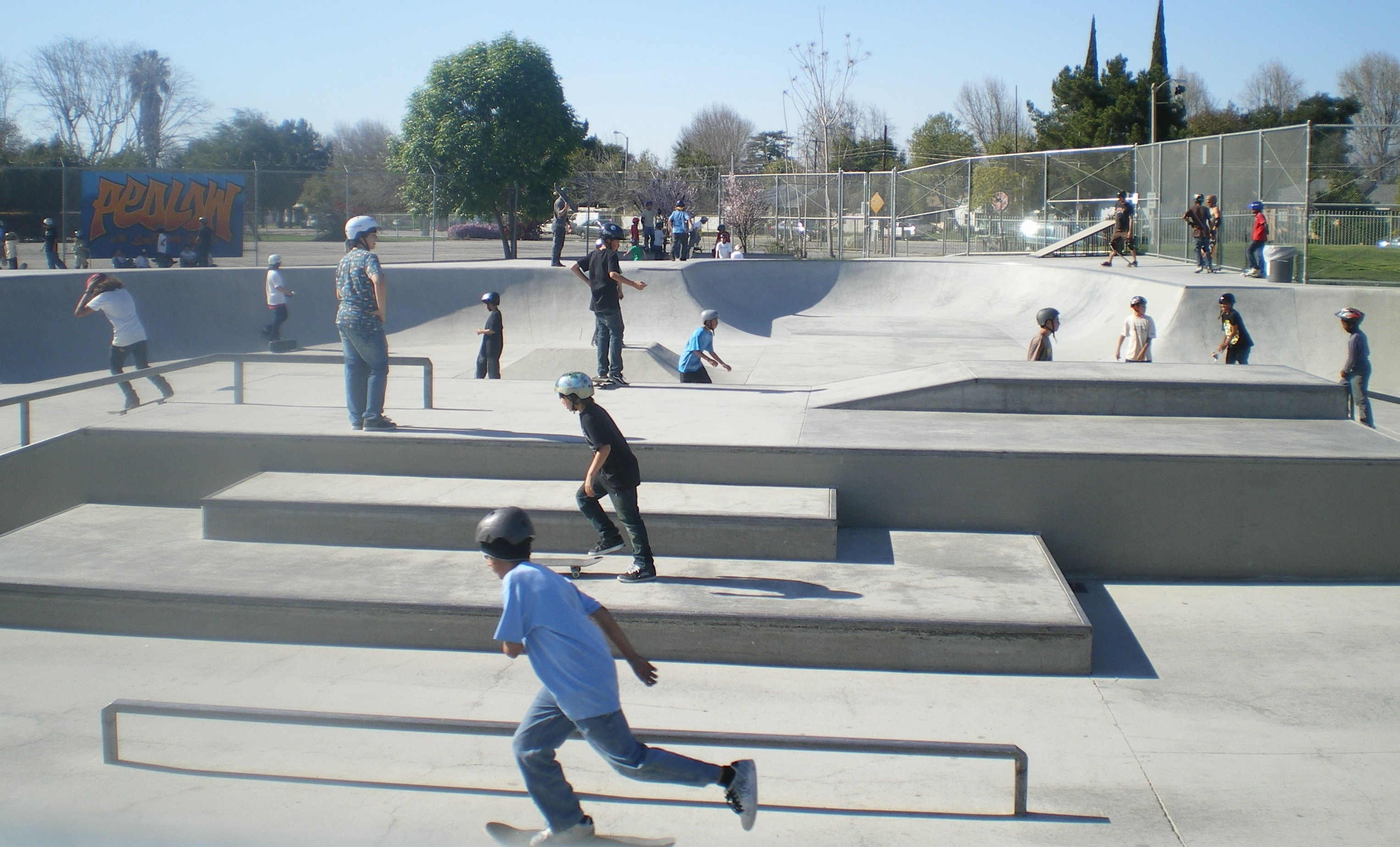
