= Denver Skatepark =

Skatepark in Denver, Colorado, U.S.

- Downtown Denver Skatepark
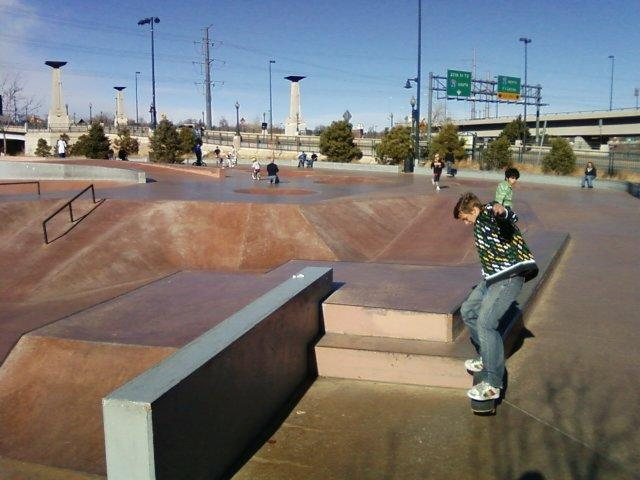
- Location: Denver, Colorado, U.S.
- Interactive map of Denver Skatepark
- Coordinates: 39°45′35″N 105°00′10″W

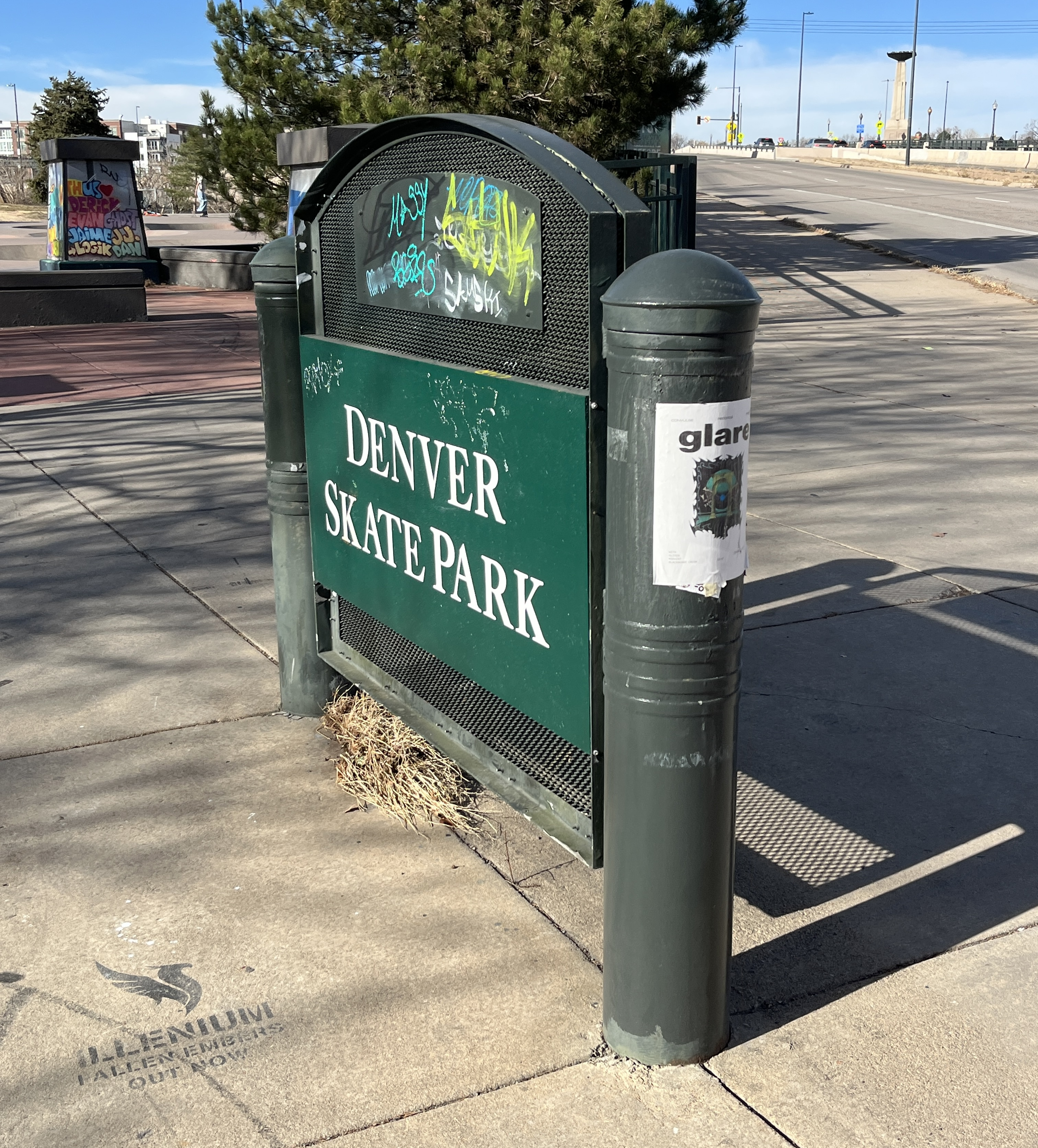
Park sign, 2025

The Denver Skatepark (also known as the Downtown Denver Skatepark) is a skatepark in Denver, Colorado, United States.

== Description ==
The 60,000-square-foot skatepark in Denver has bowls, rails, and ramps.

== History ==
A man was beaten up by a group of teenagers at the skatepark in 2010. The event "ONE Gathering -- Skate for Life" was held at Denver Skatepark in 2012. A teenager was shot and killed at the park in 2022. Tony Hawk skated on the site in 2024.

== Reception ==
CBS Colorado included Denver Skatepark in a 2014 list of the best skateparks in the state.

== See also ==
- List of skateparks
