= Stapelbäddsparken =

Skateboarding park in Malmö, Sweden

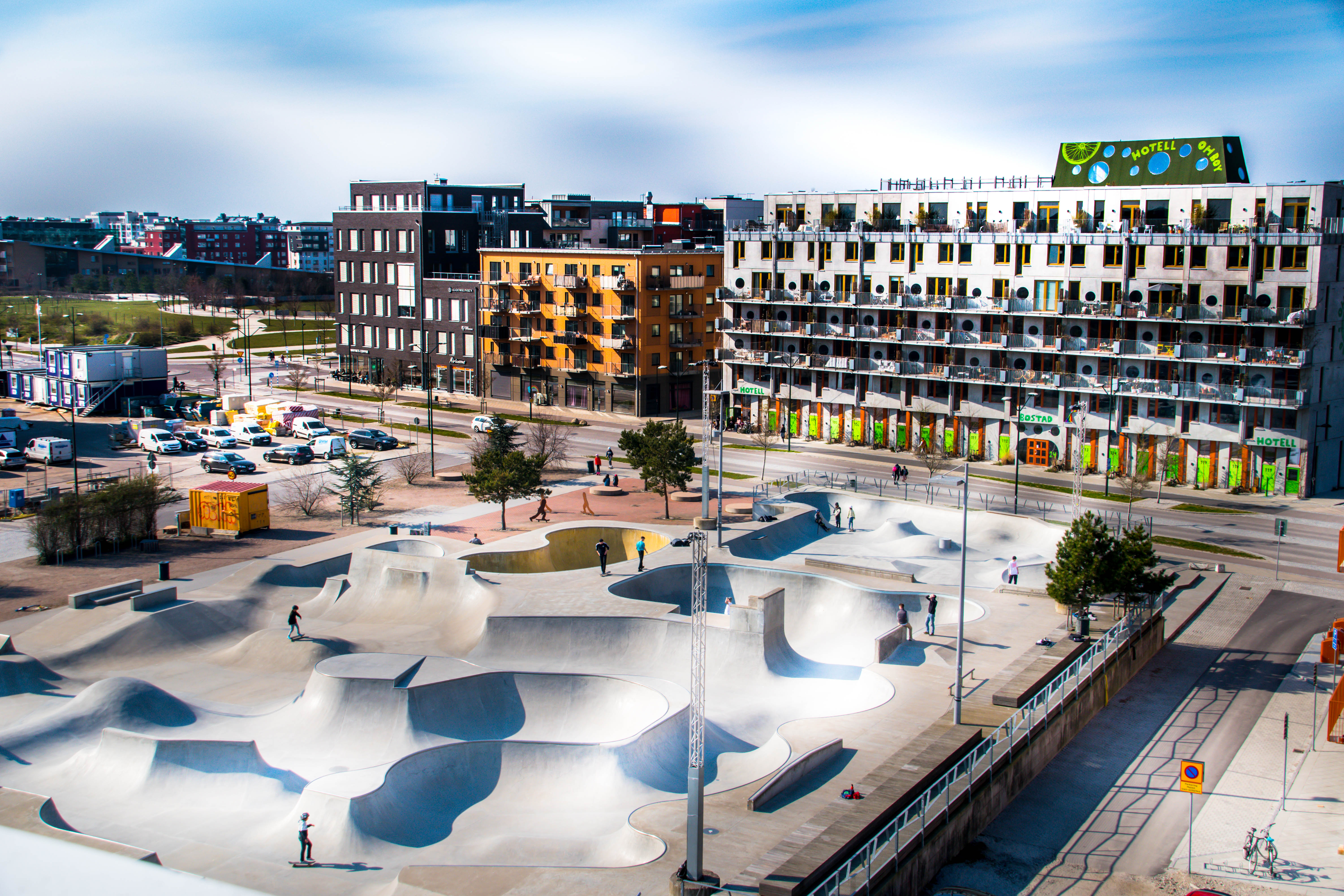
- The skatepark is located in the Västra hamnen neighbourhood of Malmö, Sweden
- Interactive map of Stapelbäddsparken
- Location: Stapelbäddsgatan 3
- Coordinates: 55°36′49″N 12°59′2″E
- Area: 5,300 m^{2} (57,000 sq ft)
- Created: 2005
- Website: skatemalmo.se/parks/stapelbaddsparken

Stapelbäddsparken (The Slipway Park) is an association, creative center, and skatepark in the Västra Hamnen neighbourhood of Malmö, Sweden. One of the largest outdoor facilities of its kind in Europe.

== History and design ==
The park was opened in the fall of 2005 as a result of cooperation between the city of Malmö, the Bryggeriet skateboarding association, and designer Stefan Hauser from Placed To Ride Inc. The facility covers an area of approximately 5,300 m^{2} (57,000 sq ft). It includes a varied course divided into street and bowl sections.

The name comes from the fact that the skatepark, the association's first project, was built in the neighborhood where the Kockums shipyard was formerly located, and its last slipway, Stapelbädd 7, is preserved.

The park is a large venue for various activities. Besides Northern Europe's largest outdoor skatepark, there is a café, as well as a bouldering park, and areas suitable for roller derby. In the summer, there are concerts, outdoor movies, and festivals.
