= Monster Skatepark =

Fully outdoor skatepark in New South Wales, Australia

Coordinates: 33.84462°S 151.06565°E

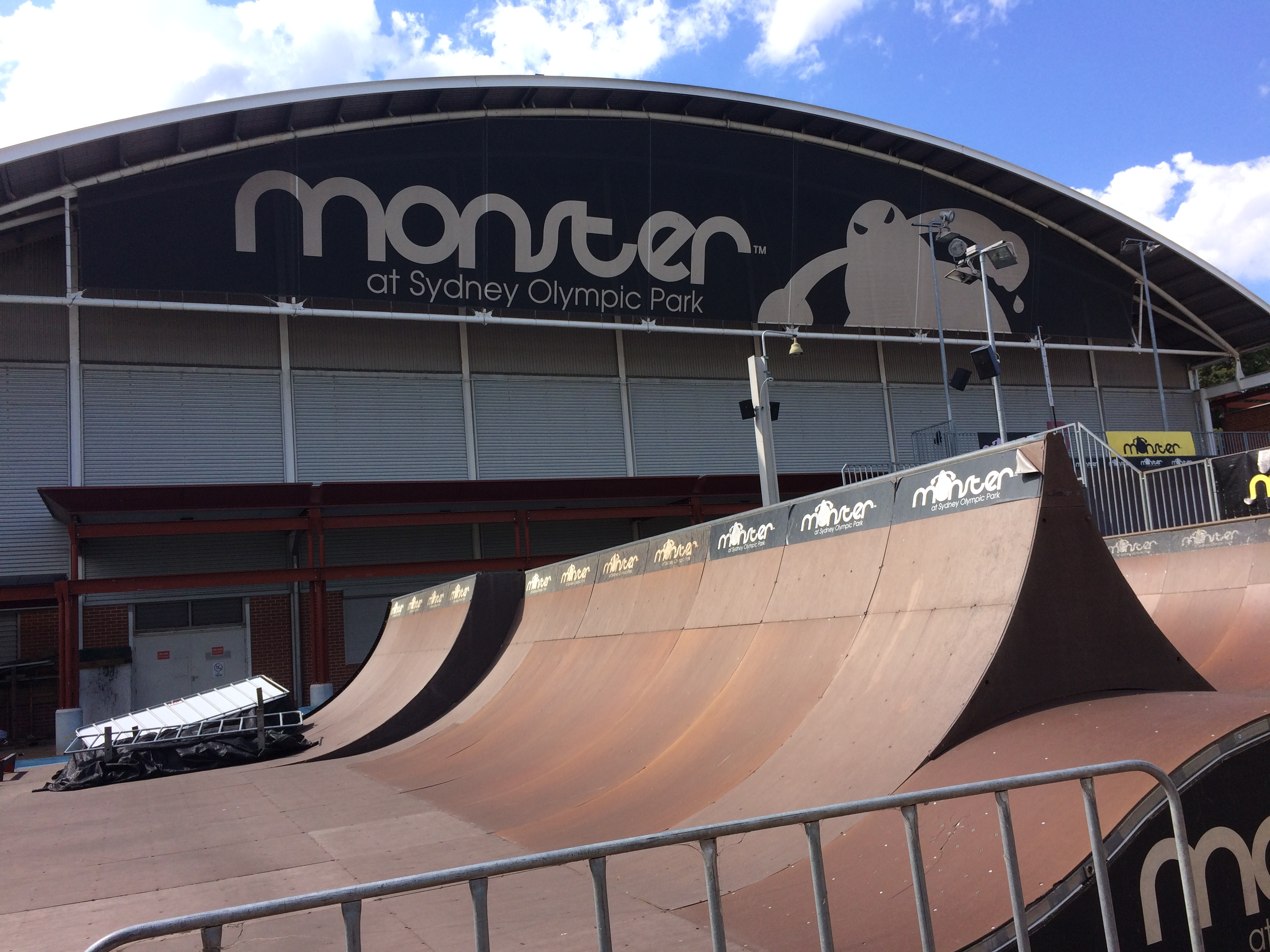
Monster Skatepark in October 2017

Monster Skatepark is an outdoor skatepark with some undercover ramps located in Sydney Olympic Park, New South Wales, Australia. Skaters can use the facility between 12 PM and 5 PM Tuesday through Friday and 9 AM to 5 PM on the weekend.

The schedule and site was designed to accommodate related recreational and sporting events, with separate sessions for skate-boarding, scooters and BMX riders, and a variety of ramps and surfaces entirely outdoors. The Monster Skatepark's central feature is promoted by the Government of New South Wales as the nation's "only international ramp facility" with mini and vertical ramps and amenities such as a shop, cafe and music for its users.

Monster Skatepark also offers school holiday programs designed for young riders of all abilities. These camps include full-day sessions featuring coaching in skateboarding, scootering, and BMX, as well as equipment hire, lunch, and recreational activities in a structured, supportive environment.

This skatepark caught fire on 12 May 2017 with the blaze being categorised as a “sixth alarm", which is large and a loud bang was heard with thick smoke covering the roof of the venue. Only 10 percent of the skatepark has been burnt down. The outdoor Vert and Spine ramp and the cafe and retail store have been reopened to the public since the 22nd of December 2018.
