= Pyongyang Skatepark =

Skatepark in Pyongyang, North Korea

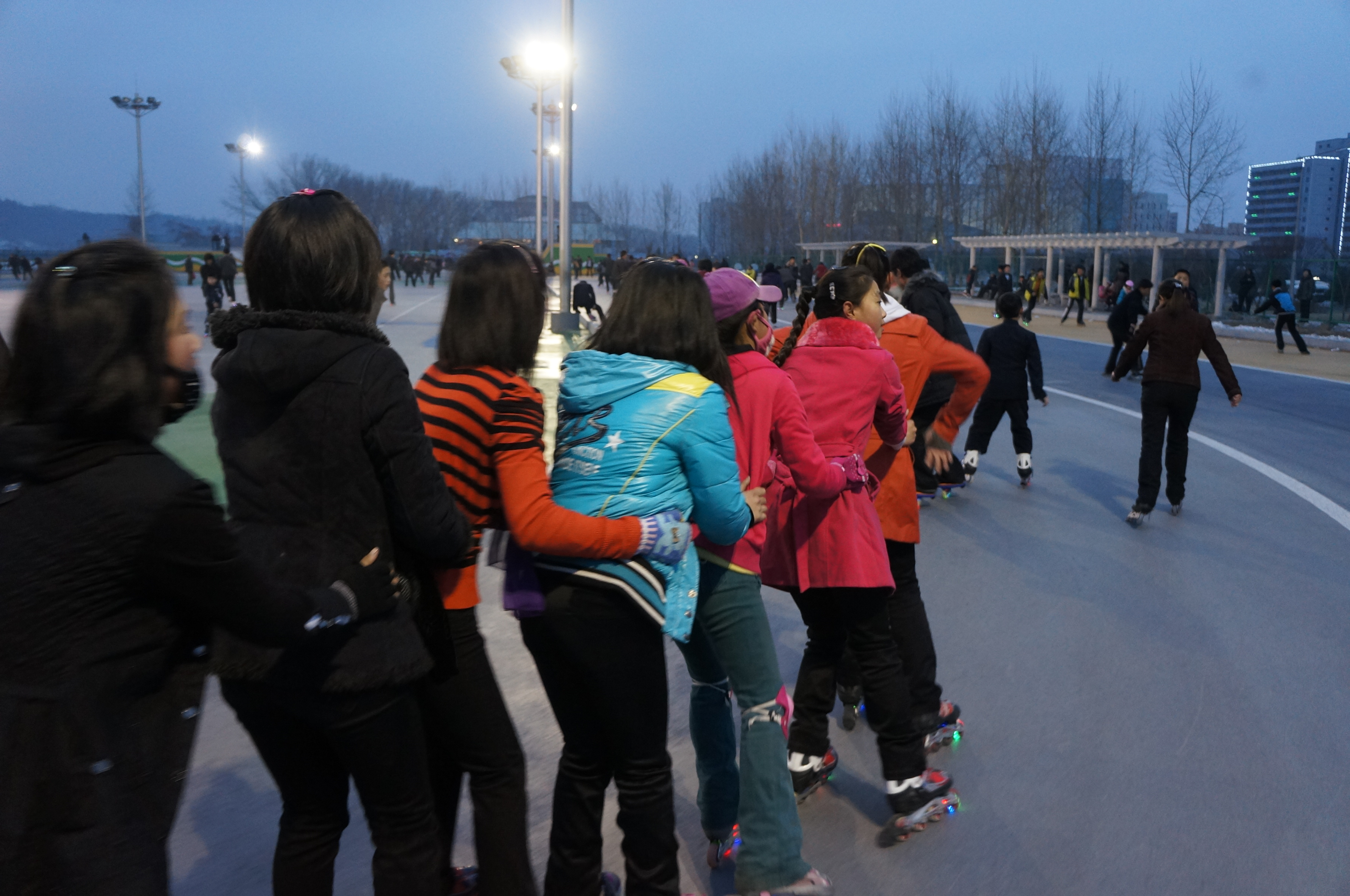
- Interactive map of Pyongyang Skatepark
- Location: Ryugyong Health Complex, Pyongyang, North Korea
- Coordinates: 39°01′43″N 125°46′02″E
- Type: Skatepark

Construction
- Opened: November 2012

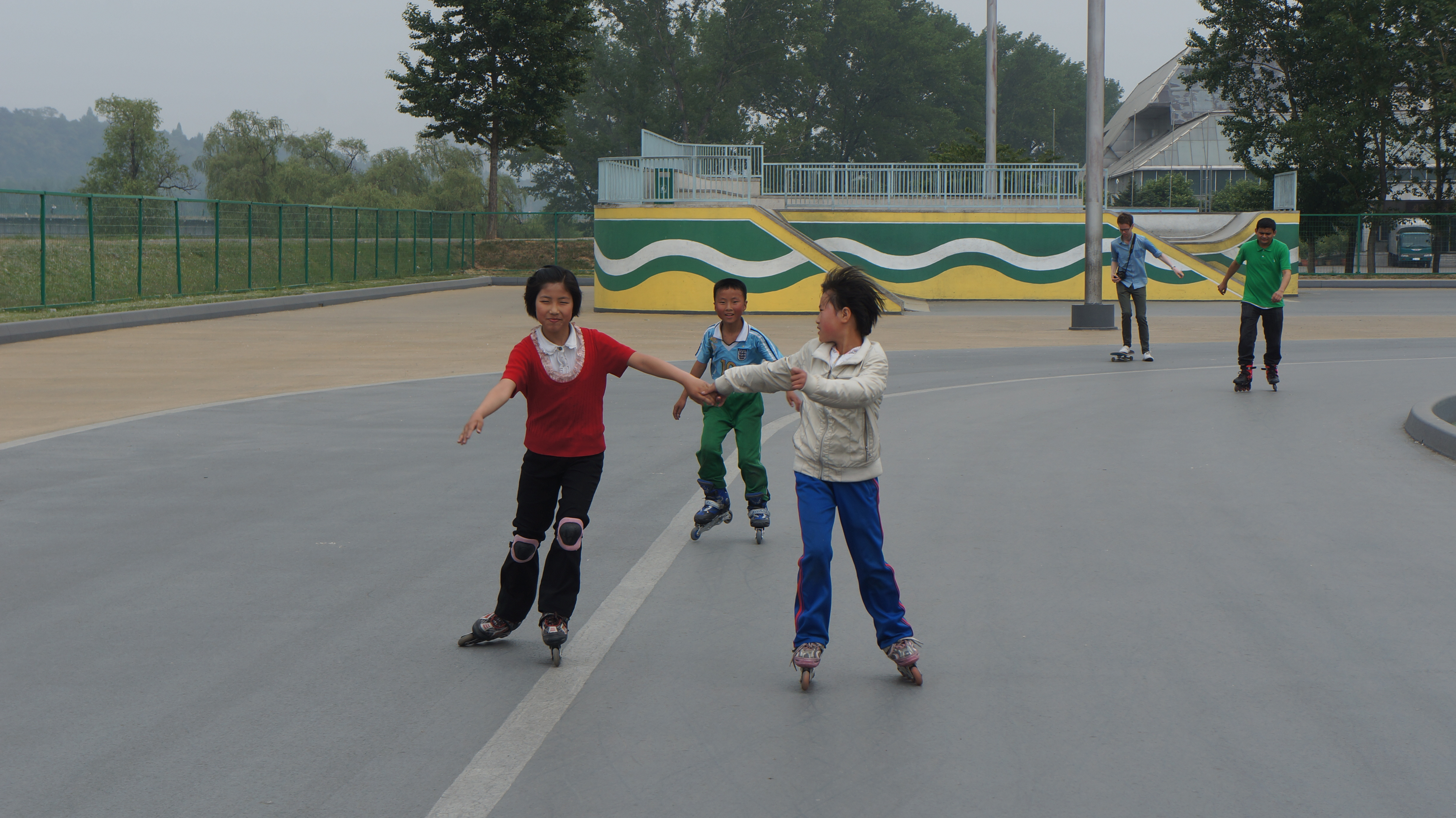
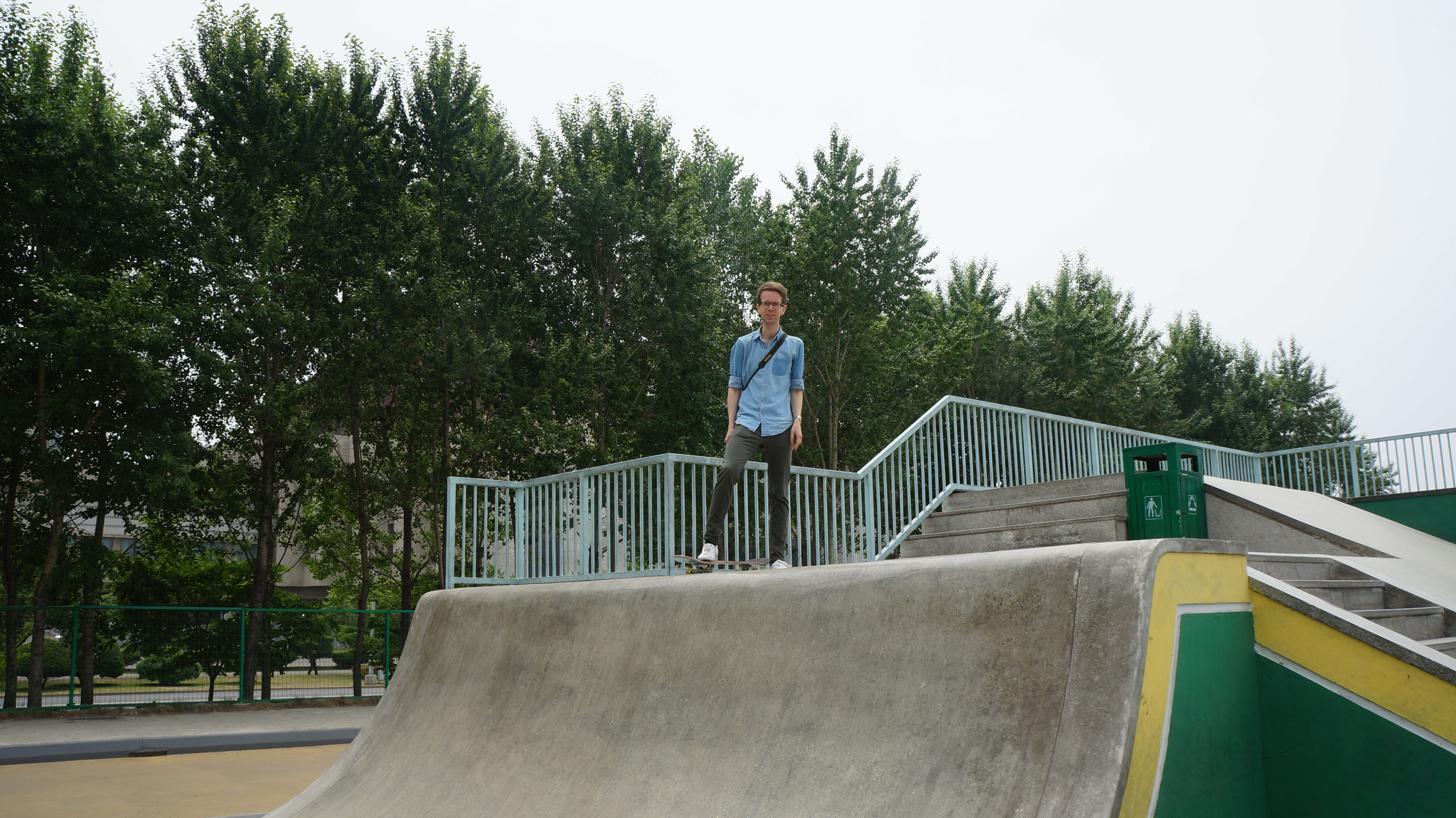
Children and youth racing through the skatepark

Pyongyang Skatepark (Korean: 평양 로라스케트장) is the first skatepark in North Korea. It was opened in November 2012 and is contained within the Ryugyong Health Complex. The skatepark includes half-pipes, ramps, grind rails and a track.

In November 2012, the Pyongyang Skatepark was visited by Kim Jong Un, the Chairman of the Workers' Party of Korea of the Democratic People's Republic of Korea where he said: "in order to develop sports, it is necessary to steadily seek means and methods suited to the actual conditions of the country on the basis of thorough preparations and develop sports science and put it on a high level, underscoring the need to take measures for the supply of physical exercise apparatuses".

It remains unclear how strong the skateboarding culture is in North Korea. According to Alejandro Cao de Benós de Les y Pérezis, Special Delegate for the Committee for Cultural Relations with Foreign Countries, North Koreans are more into inline skating, a hint on how this skatepark may be used. According to Patrik Wallner of VisualTraveling who travelled twice to North Korea, skateboarding is not "tolerated" in the streets of the country.
