= The Flow Skatepark =

Skatepark in Columbus, Ohio

Coordinates: 39°57′21″N 83°06′29″W

The Flow Skatepark was a world-famous skatepark in Columbus, Ohio, US, established July 6, 2001 by Shannon Turner and Craig Billingsley. At approximately 50,000 square feet (4,600 m^{2}), The Flow was one of the largest indoor skateparks in the nation. It was voted #1 skatepark in the United States by Fuel TV.

The Flow Skatepark closed April 28, 2013.

A section of The Flow

== Contests ==
The Dirty East The Dirty was one of the largest Bmx Pro/Am Contests in the midwest, founded in 2001.

Hellaween

The King of Rhythm
