= Vancouver Skate Plaza =

Skatepark in Vancouver, British Columbia, Canada

Coordinates: 49.277285°N 123.102535°W

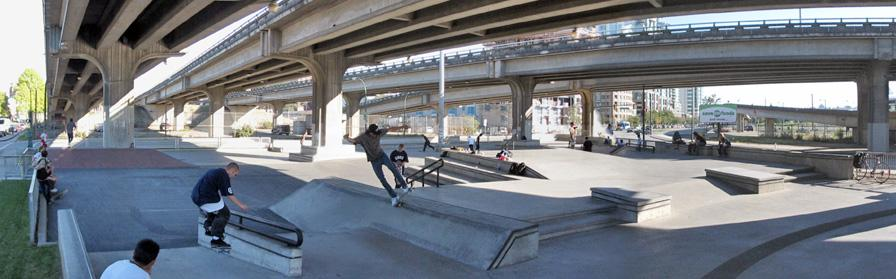
Vancouver plaza

The Vancouver Skate Plaza is a skatepark in Vancouver, British Columbia. It is located under the Georgia Street and Dunsmuir viaducts at the corner of Union St. and Quebec St. It was designed and built in 2004, making it the first Street plaza skatepark.

The design mimics urban plazas popular in the downtown cores of many large cities, including handrails, ledges, and stairs. It is free to use and covers 26,000 square feet. Vancouver Skate Plaza was named as number 21 on a top-25 list of best skate parks in the world by Complex magazine in August 2013.
