= Metro Nashville Skatepark =

Public concrete skatepark in Nashville, Tennessee

Coordinates: 36.18725°N 86.68673°W

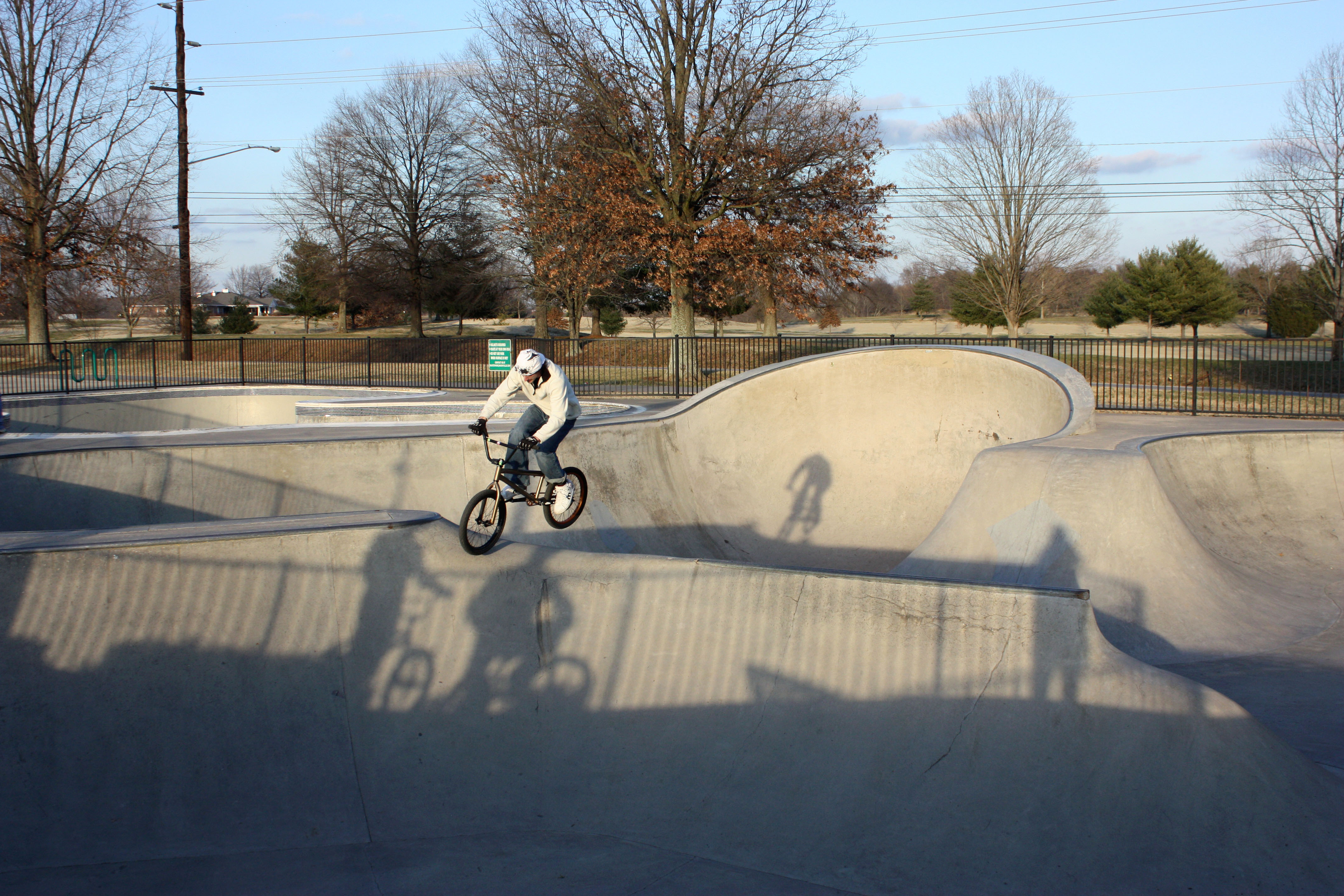
BMXer on the Wabash Cannonbowl

The Metro Nashville Skatepark (also known as Concrete Wave Country or Two Rivers Skatepark) is a public concrete skatepark located in Nashville, Tennessee, United States. It occupies approximately 22,000 square feet (2,000 m^{2}) in Two Rivers Park adjacent to Nashville's public wave pool, Wave Country. The park is open year-round from dawn until 11 pm, and allows skateboards, in-line skates, and BMX bikes.

The skatepark consists of three different areas of skate terrain that range in size from small street obstacles to a 10 foot (3 m) deep bowl (combi-pool) with pool coping known as the General Jackson in honor of the General Jackson riverboat. The mid-sized flow bowl is known as the Wabash Cannonbowl in honor of the popular Wabash Cannonball rollercoaster ride at Nashville's Opryland USA theme park, which closed in 1997. The street area at the park is known as the Angle Inn, which references the angular nature of most street skating obstacles, along with a historical nod to the Angle Inn attraction at Opryland USA.

The skatepark was constructed in 2004 by the Metro Nashville Parks Department at a cost of $500,000. Wally Hollyday of Wally Hollyday Skateparks was the construction manager and principal designer of the park. Mayor Bill Purcell presided over the skatepark's grand opening ceremony on July 1, 2004, along with numerous local skaters and BMXers.
