= Rampworx skatepark =

Indoor skate park in Liverpool, England

Coordinates: 53.4827°N 2.9571°W

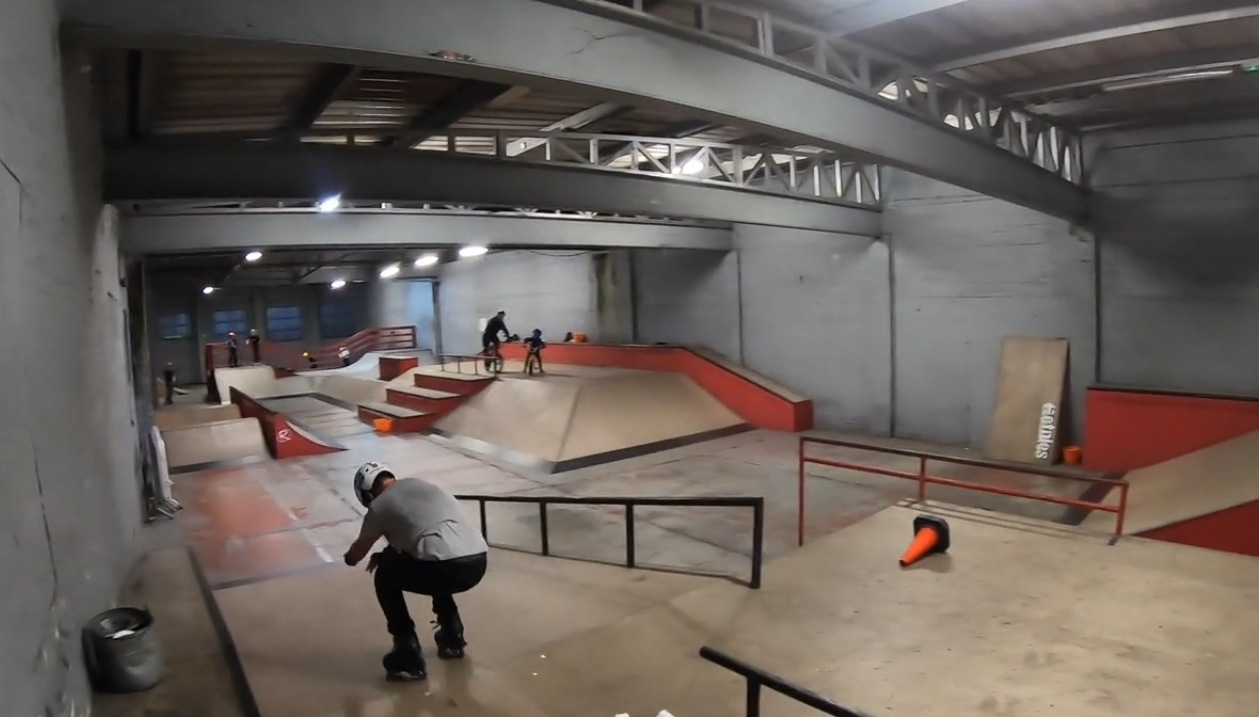
Rampworx

Rampworx is an indoor skatepark in Aintree, Liverpool, England. It covers over 70,000-square-foot (6,500 m^{2}), making it the largest in the United Kingdom. It caters for rollerbladers, skateboarders, BMX riders and scooter riders.
