= Turf Skatepark =

Former skatepark in Greenfield, Wisconsin

Coordinates: 42°57′45″N 87°58′02″W

- Interactive map of Turf Skatepark

Construction
- Opened: 1987

Turf Skatepark, also known as "Surfin' Turf" or "The Turf", is a former skatepark located in Greenfield, Wisconsin, United States, less than one mile south of the city of Milwaukee. The Turf was an indoor/outdoor facility consisting of five sculptured concrete pools providing some of the best terrain of its time.

== Concrete pools ==
The Turf included five sculptured concrete pools:

- The Lip Slide Gully: 4-foot-deep (1.2 m) pool, with a gradual 30-foot (9.1 m) entry to a shallow pool
- The Footie Bowl: 5-foot-deep (1.5 m), 23-foot-diameter (7.0 m) pool with a comma-shaped roll-in, the transition was similar to most mini ramps
- The Triple Pool (aka The Clover): 3 connecting bowls (one 4 feet deep and two 8 feet deep) with concrete coping and ceramic tile
- The Key Hole Pool: 10 feet deep, 23-foot (7.0 m) diameter with concrete coping and ceramic tile
- The Half Pipe Capsule: 11 to 13 feet deep with 1 to 3 feet of vertical

== History ==
Designed by legendary Skatepark designer, California Architect Art Kent (aka Footie) in 1979 through the Foxfire Skatepark Development Group. Art is the original designer of the Three Leaf Clover and Side Entry Capsule Bowl in 1970's. The Park was Originally opened by Jerry Steuernagel in 1979 as Surfin' Turf near Interstate 894 and West Loomis Road, his unique indoor skatepark designed by Kent consisted of in-ground concrete pools for riding skateboards. The overhead warehouse side doors were open in the summertime and closed during inclement weather to allow for all year round skateboarding. The park had a unique mix of beginner, intermediate and advanced year round skate elements. As bowl riding lost popularity and skaters were more involved in "street style" skating, it closed in 1982 and the building was repurposed as a strip club called Bell E. Buttons, though the pools remained intact under the floor.

In 1987, the original owner of the skatepark was able to reacquire the building and reopen it for skateboarding as The Turf. At that time, it was one of only a handful of skateparks left in the U.S., and the only indoor skatepark in the country. It attracted professional and amateur skateboarders from around the world.

In 1995, skating any kind of transition was considered "uncool" and people and magazines alike thought Vert skating was in its death throes. This prompted the owner to fill the bowls with gravel, take off the pool coping that was on the Clover and the Keyhole bowls and cover the entire indoor portion of the park with concrete, and built a street course, hoping to make the park profitable once again. Unfortunately, this did not work and in 1996 the Turf closed for good. The building then housed a cabinet company and a lawn and garden shop for nearly 15 years.

In 2010, the Wisconsin Department of Transportation acquired the property for use as a staging area during the construction of a new freeway ramp. Shallow excavation of the property by the DOT revealed that the bowls were still in place and had simply been filled with gravel. Some local skaters got news of this and tried to dig out the bowls by hand. They were able to reveal some small portions of the smaller bowls and even ride a bit of the Lip Slide Gully before the effort was shut down by law enforcement and the DOT.

Opportunity presented itself in 2019 when, after extensive negotiations with the Wisconsin Department of Transportation, Mayor Michael Neitzke purchased the land for $1, on the condition it will forever be a public park. In the spring of 2020, in what was essentially an archeological dig site of skateboarding history and culture, Greenfield Public Works excavated and inspected all 5 of the original bowls. The city strove to revive the skatepark.

On February 19, 2020 The Turf Skatepark Association (Save The Turf) and Grindline (a skatepark design company) hosted a design workshop to get community input aimed at rebuilding and reopening The Turf. Grindline and Save The Turf created an ambitious plan that involved restoring the old bowls and adding additional, more modern features to create a larger skatepark. Years of fundraising and negotiation with Greenfield finally paid off.

The original plan was scaled back slightly and in late summer 2024 Grindline broke ground to restore and build up the new Turf. After much debate it was decided that the original bowls could not be renovated due to deterioration and insufficient drainage. The bowls were instead rebuilt exactly as the originals using the original blueprints as a guide. Only very minor changes were made to the roll-in of the capsule and the rounded edges of the smaller bowls including the footie. A large plaza area to accommodate "street style" skating was added as was a large "flow bowl," which represents a more modern bowl approach.

The entire new park is outdoors with no structure over it. There is hope that a structure could be added over part of the park in a future phase.

The Turf officially reopened at a ribbon-cutting ceremony on June 7, 2025.

== Turf membership ==
In 2010, former owner Jerry Steuernagel described the skatepark at its peak: "We had 10,000 members from all over the world. Every kid was a member. That's how I sold it."

=== Notable Turf members ===
Numerous skateboarders have frequented The Turf. Notable among them are Patrick Emerick, Aaron Draplin, Tony Hawk, Cyndy Pendergast, and Tony Alva.
