= Legacy Skatepark =

Public skatepark in Ottawa, Ontario, Canada

Coordinates: 45.34561°N 75.76105°W

Legacy Skatepark is a public skatepark located in Ottawa, Ontario, Canada. It is the largest skatepark of the city, covering 18,300 square feet. It is located south of Baseline Road and Woodroffe Avenue in the suburb of Nepean.

The park is fully public and unmonitored, meaning padding or payment is not required to use the park. The skatepark's community is highly active and devoted; skaters organize an annual snow removal of the park towards winter's end. Legacy is often chosen for skateboard related events, such as Wild in the Parks, Go Skateboarding Day, and professional demonstrations. Despite being built in 2004 and receiving heavy use, the park is still in good condition.

The park officially opened on October 16, 2004, despite not being completed at the time. Police had to chase skateboarders from the unfinished park on a regular basis. The city of Ottawa commissioned the production of the park to Spectrum Skateparks, a Canadian skatepark construction company. Legacy is a popular meet-up spot for skateboarders in the area due to it being central and conveniently located next to a busy transit station. The park is also a hot spot for graffiti artists, serving as a great place to practice on the walls. It is common for a new piece to spring up overnight, quite frequently. The park is fully covered in graffiti, except the ground.
