= Skate Park at RFK Campus =

Skate park in Washington, D.C.

Coordinates: 38°53′26″N 76°58′29″W

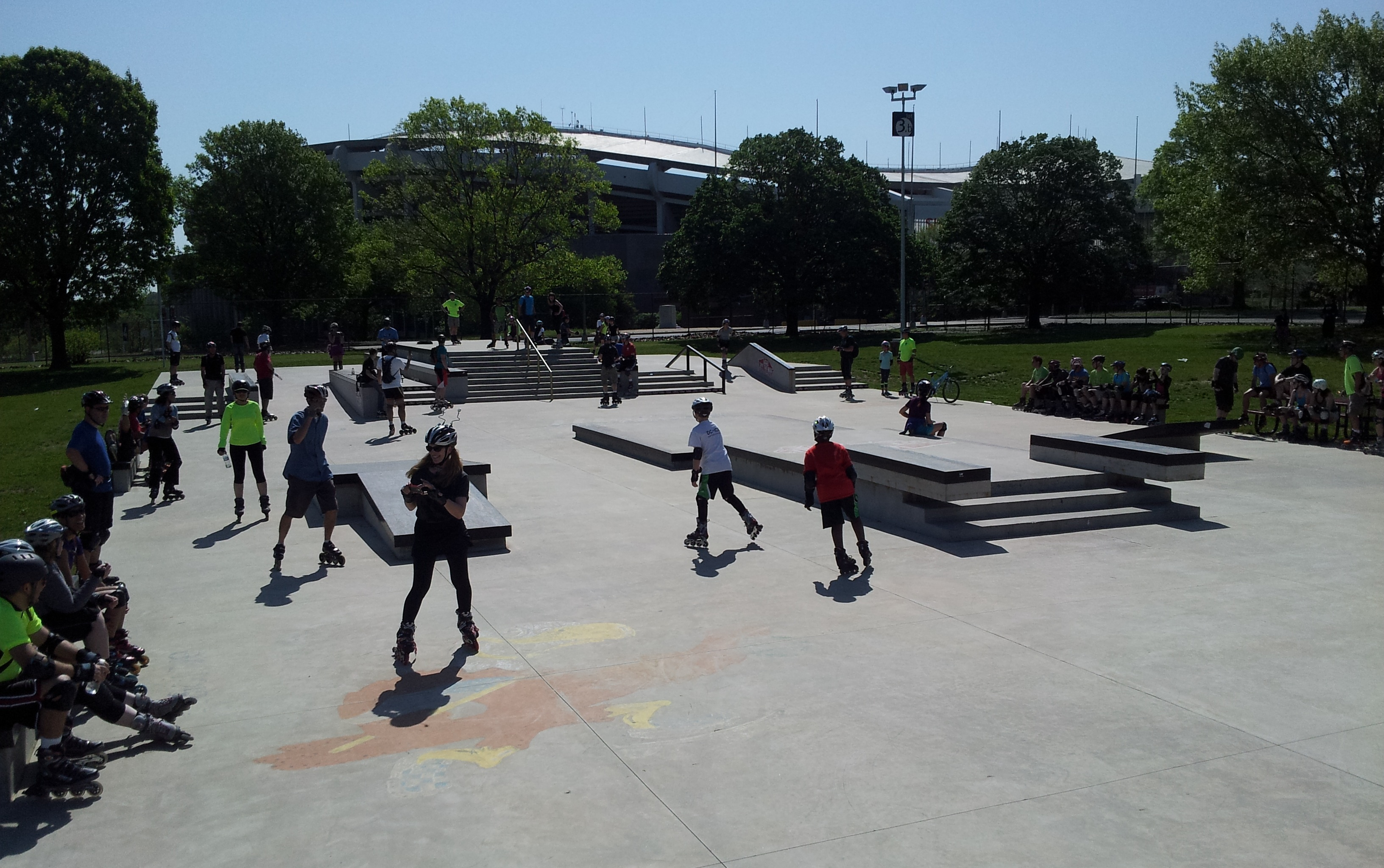
The skate park in 2014, showing RFK Stadium in the background

Skate Park at RFK Campus, formerly known as Maloof Skate Park, is a 15,000-square-foot skate park on the RFK Stadium campus in Washington D.C. The park opened in 2011 for a million dollars by funds provided by the Maloof Money Cup.

After the inaugural Maloof Money Cup DC in September 2011 was hosted here, the park remained closed to the public, and although there were rumors of deconstruction, the park is now open for day use. The design of the park was inspired by features in Freedom Plaza, and the urban architecture up and down Pennsylvania Avenue. Features include a great number of steps, jumps, ledges, rails, a 4 ft quarter pipe, and a 5–6 ft vert wall. The features vary in size and the park is suitable for beginner to advanced skaters.
