= Skateboarding in Portland, Oregon =

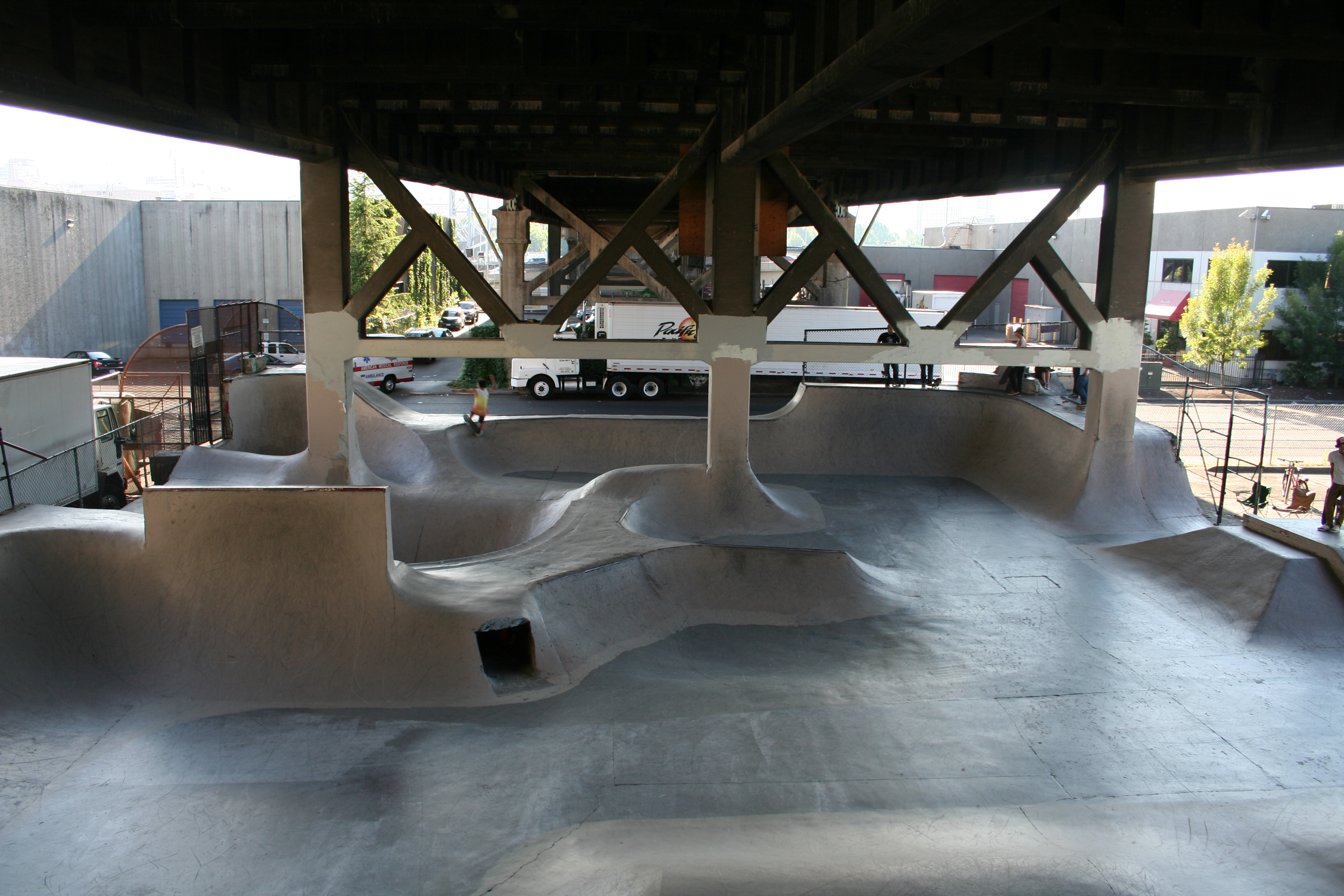
Burnside Skatepark, 2007

The American city of Portland, Oregon has been described as skateboard-friendly and the "skateboarding capital of the world". Portland Parks & Recreation operates multiple public parks with skateparks and there are other "do it yourself" (DIY) skateparks such as Burnside Skatepark. The city has seen skateboarding incorporated into school curriculum.

In Portland, skateboarders "have the same legal status as bicycles, meaning they can be in the streets as long as they signal, wear front lights at night and obey the road rules", according to The Oregonian.

== Culture ==
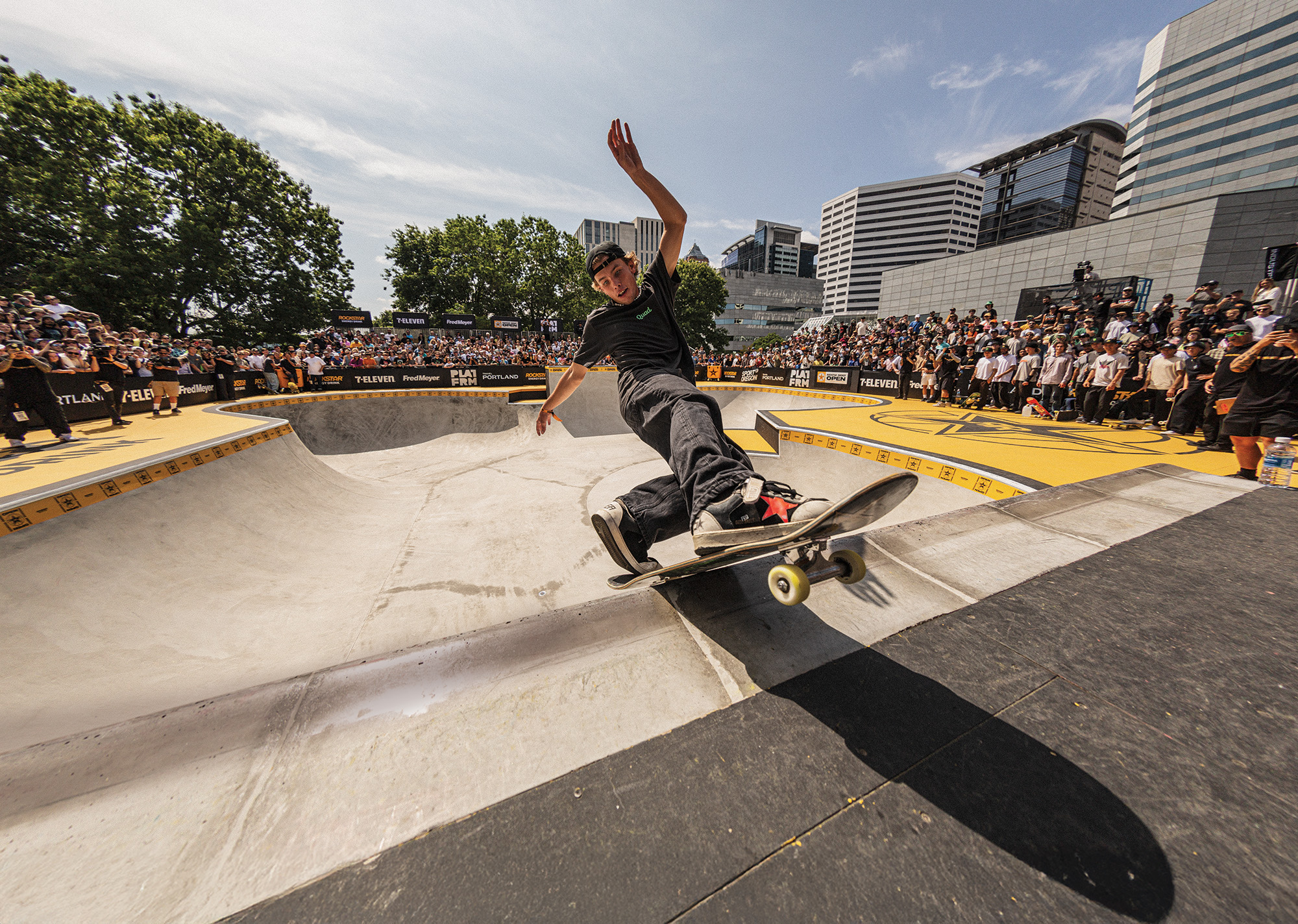
Keegan Palmer skateboarding at the Rockstar Energy Open in 2024

Portland has an LGBTQ skateboarding group. The local nonprofit organization Skate Like a Girl promotes participation by women and transgender people.

In 2014, the Oregon Museum of Science and Industry (OMSI) hosted the Tony Hawk-Rad Science exhibit, which focused on physics principles and skateboarding. In 2025, the nation's largest mural of a skateboard was painted at Portland Dream Plaza. Through My Board, a documentary film about a Black and deaf skateboarder at the Burnside Skatepark, premiered at the Hollywood Theatre as part of the Portland Panorama film festival in 2026.

Skatechurch was established in 1987 in the parking lot of Central Bible Church in northeast Portland.

=== Business ===
Cal Skate Skateboards in the Old Town Chinatown neighborhood has been described as "a steadfast fixture of skate culture in Portland". The store has hosted an annual Oregon Skate Swap.

Commonwealth Skateboarding has operated in southeast Portland for over a decade. It sells skateboards and has an indoor skatepark.

=== Events ===
Portland hosted the skateboarding event Rockstar Energy Open at Tom McCall Waterfront Park in 2024 and 2025. The 2024 event saw 80 skateboarders compete and attracted approximately 25,000 people. The three-day event in 2026 featured live music.

== Skateparks ==
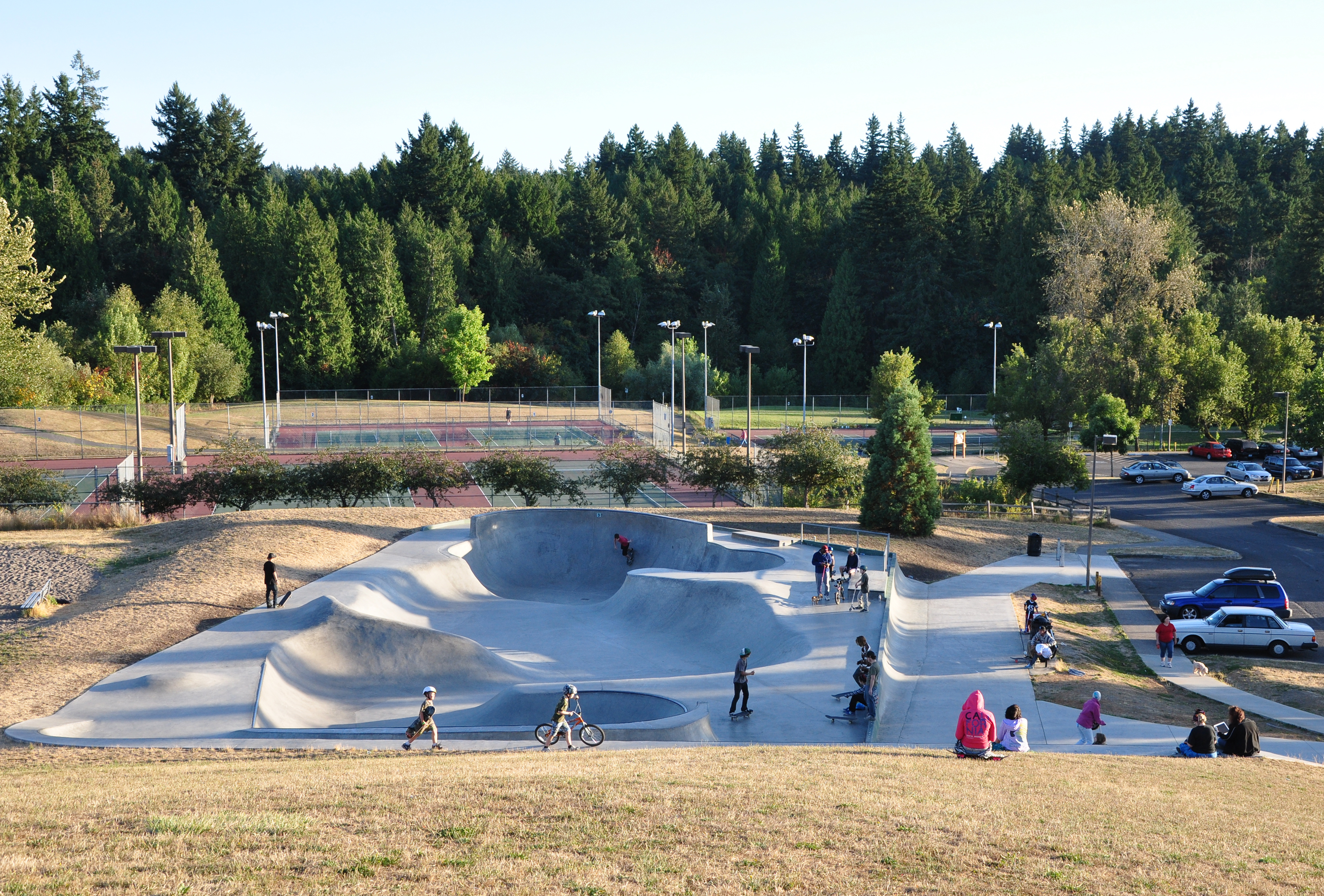
The skatepark at Gabriel Park, 2010

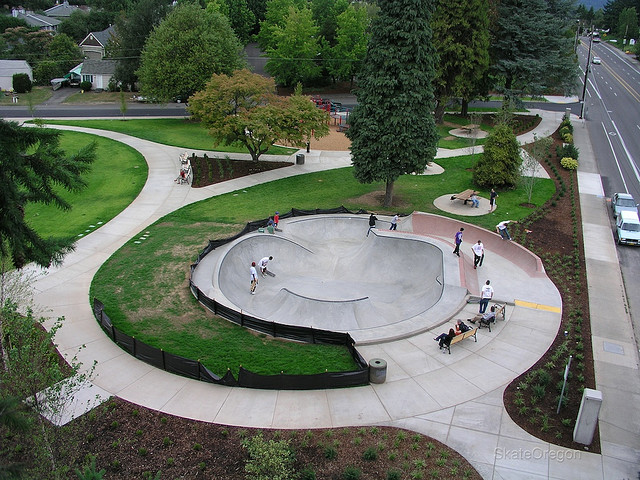
The skatepark at Holly Farm Park, 2007

The following parks operated by Portland Parks & Recreation (PP&R) have skateparks:

- Berrydale Park, Montavilla
- Ed Benedict Park, Powellhurst-Gilbert
- Errol Heights Park, Brentwood-Darlington
- Gabriel Park, Multnomah
- Gateway Discovery Park, Hazelwood
- Glenhaven Park, Madison South
- Holly Farm Park, West Portland Park
- Kʰunamokwst Park, Cully
- Luuwit View Park, Argay Terrace
- Parklane Park, Centennial
- Pier Park, St. Johns

PP&R hosts skateboarding programs annually.

Burnside Skatepark, located under the east side of the Burnside Bridge, is not operated by PP&R. It has been described as "one of the nation's meccas for skateboarding" and "part of the Portland lore". As of 2026, other "do it yourself" (DIY) skateparks in the city are along the south side of Laurelhurst Park, at Dream Plaza in southeast Portland, and at the intersection of Southeast 7th and Sandy Boulevard. Volunteers have also created "Feral Cat Cave" in the Lents neighborhood, along the Springwater Corridor near Southeast 100th Avenue. There is a DIY skatepark at Creston Park.

There is a skatepark at Portland State University's Northeast Campus. The Steel Bridge Skatepark is planned for Old Town Chinatown. The Rachel Grace Skate Plaza is in northeast Portland's Concordia neighborhood. A DIY skatepark in southeast Portland's Woodstock neighborhood, known as Appletree Park, was named the city's "best sidewalk skatepark" by Willamette Week in 2026.

== See also ==
- Livin' It, 2004 film
