= Discovery Park =

Discovery Park may refer to:

== Music ==
- "Discovery Park", a track on Gas Huffer's 1996 album The Inhuman Ordeal of Special Agent Gas Huffer
- Welcome to Discovery Park, 2002 studio album by the alternative rock band Brad

== Places ==
- Discovery Park (Burnaby), a research community at Burnaby Mountain, Burnaby, British Columbia, Canada
- Discovery Park, a park at Copernicus Science Centre, Warsaw, Poland

=== England ===
- Discovery Park Enterprise Zone, Kent
- Hidden Valley Discovery Park, a family-run visitor attraction near the town of Launceston, Cornwall
- Wildwood Discovery Park, a woodland discovery park in Herne, near Canterbury in Kent

=== Hong Kong ===
- Discovery Park (Hong Kong), a private housing estate in Tsuen Wan New Town, Hong Kong
- Discovery Park (constituency), in Tsuen Wan District, Hong Kong

=== United States ===
- Cambridge Discovery Park (also known as "CDP" or "the Park"), formerly known as Acorn Park, an office and laboratory campus in Cambridge, Massachusetts
- Discovery Park (Arizona), a scientific research and community area in Safford, Arizona
- Discovery Park (Chula Vista), California
- Discovery Park (Purdue), a research park at Purdue University, Indiana, United States
- Discovery Park (Sacramento), a park in Sacramento, California, part of the American River Parkway
- Discovery Park (Seattle), a park in the peninsular Magnolia neighborhood of Seattle, Washington
- Discovery Park, a park in Omaha, Nebraska
- Discovery Water Park, a defunct waterpark in Newberry Springs, California
- Discovery Park of America, museum and heritage park near Union City, Tennessee
- Gateway Discovery Park, a public park in northeast Portland, Oregon
- Dousman's Mill, formerly known as Historic Mill Creek State Park, Historic Mill Creek, Historic Mill Creek Discovery Park, and Old Mill Creek State Historic Park, a state park, nature preserve, and historic site in Michigan
- West Point Light, also known as the Discovery Park Lighthouse, a navigation aid on Seattle, Washington's West Point, which juts into Puget Sound, marking the northern extent of Elliott Bay
- University of North Texas Discovery Park, a satellite research facility of the University of North Texas

== See also ==
- Discovery Green, a public park in downtown Houston, Texas, United States
