= Mark "Monk" Hubbard =

American skatepark builder (1970–2018)

- Born: October 27, 1970; Seattle, Washington, U.S.
- Died: June 8, 2018 (aged 47); West Seattle
- Occupation(s): Skateboarder, Skatepark builder, artist

Mark "Monk" Hubbard (October 27, 1970 – June 8, 2018) was a skateboarder, artist, skatepark builder, and founder of Grindline Skateparks.

== Early life ==
Hubbard was born in West Seattle in 1970 and received his first skateboard in 1975 for his fifth birthday.

== Skatepark building ==
In regards to skateparks, Hubbard believed in DIY skate spots and building one's own skateboarding paradise, stating that there is nothing that compares to riding an obstacle you've built. Monk was involved in the Burnside Skatepark project.

=== Grindline Skateparks ===
On January 26, 2000 Monk founded Grindline Skateparks. As of 2015, Grindline had built over 300 parks across the world. During his life, Hubbard helped design and build hundreds of skate parks. Some consider Monk to be the originator of the modern skate park design.

==== Wounded Knee 4-Directions Toby Eagle Bull Memorial Skatepark ====
Hubbard was part of the core group, alongside Pine Ridge Native Walt Pourier, Jim Murphy, and Jeff Ament, that originated the idea to build the Wounded Knee 4-Directions Toby Eagle Bull Memorial Skatepark on the Pine Ridge Indian Reservation. Grindline designed and constructed the skatepark, completing the park in 2011.

=== Skatepark Highway System ===
In 2015, Hubbard predicted a future where major cities provide a skatepark system highway, intentionally connecting the skateparks.
