= Wounded Knee 4-Directions Toby Eagle Bull Memorial Skatepark =

Skatepark in Pine Ridge, South Dakota

- Type: Skatepark
- Location: Pine Ridge, South Dakota
- Opened: 2011
- Terrain: Concrete

The Wounded Knee 4-Directions Toby Eagle Bull Memorial Skatepark, also known as the Toby Eagle Bull Memorial Wounded Knee Four Directions Skate Park & the WK4-Directions TEB Memorial Skatepark, is a concrete skatepark located in Pine Ridge, South Dakota, United States, on the Pine Ridge Indian Reservation. Completed in 2011 by the local community with help from skateboarding organizations, the skatepark features a spectrum of skate obstacles and is dedicated to a young Lakota skater who died in a car accident: Toby Eagle Bull. The WK4D TOB Memorial Skatepark is located in the Youth Opportunity, or "YO," park, adjacent to the Oglala Lakota Nation powwow grounds, a picnic area, a playground, a basketball court as well as a baseball field.

== History ==
The WK4-Directions Skatepark originated as a DIY-wooden half-pipe located on a tennis court. Walter Pourier travelled to Pine Ridge and worked with students to repair the pipe. The following year, he brought in Grindline Skateparks, led by Mark Hubbard, who built a top-of-the-line skatepark at the location of the old wooden ramp.

The idea for the WK4-Directions Skatepark originated with the group of Pine Ridge Native Walt Pourier, Jim Murphy, Jeff Ament, and Mark "Monk" Hubbard who all shared a grand idea to build a skatepark on the Pine Ridge Indian Reservation. Pearl Jam and VANS collaborated on a skate shoe, donating they money raised from the shoe to help the skatepark raise the money to build the first stage of the skatepark. The Tony Hawk Foundation helped with the park as well, working with the Stronghold Society, a skateboarding non-profit founded by Walt Pourier and Jim Murphy.

=== Family of Toby Eagle Bull skateboard contest ===
The family of Toby Eagle Bull puts on a large skateboard competition every year during the Oglala Lakota Nation Fair and Rodeo.
