= Stronghold Society =

American nonprofit skateboarding organization

The Stronghold Society is a non-profit organization that advocates for skateboarding, with a focus on creating and sustaining skateparks in Native American communities.

== Organization ==
The Stronghold Society was founded by Walt Pourier, Mark "Monk" Hubbard, James Murphy, and Jeff Ament. Pourier is the current executive director of the organization.

=== Wounded Knee Four Directions Skatepark Program ===
Walt and the Stronghold Society teamed up with Wounded Knee Skateboards to bring the Wounded Knee 4-Directions Skatepark to kids on Pine Ridge reservation in South Dakota. The park opened in Pine Ridge Village in 2011.

=== Arts programs ===
The Stronghold Society runs arts programs for youth.

=== Mental health campaigns ===
The organization also runs media campaigns promoting youth mental health.
