= Steel Bridge =

Bridge in Portland, Oregon

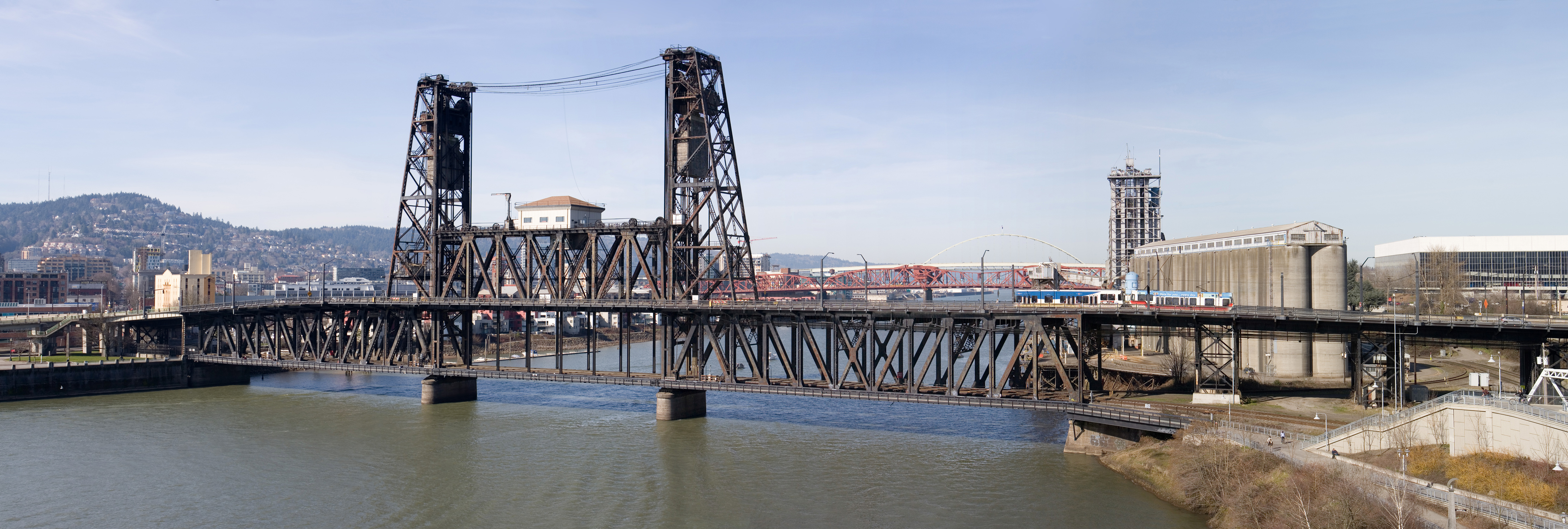
- Coordinates: 45°31′39″N 122°40′09″W
- Carries: Upper: 2 outer lanes for general traffic, 2 inner lanes solely for MAX Light Rail, and sidewalks on both sides Lower: Union Pacific Railroad (incl. Amtrak toward Eugene) and walkway
- Crosses: Willamette River
- Locale: Portland, Oregon
- Owner: Union Pacific Railroad
- Maintained by: Union Pacific Railroad

Characteristics
- Design: Through truss with a double vertical-lift span
- Width: 71 feet (22 m)
- Longest span: 211 feet (64 m)
- Clearance below: 26 feet (7.9 m) closed 72 feet (22 m) lower deck raised 163 feet (50 m) fully raised

History
- Opened: 1912 (replaced 1888 bridge)

Location
- Interactive map of Steel Bridge

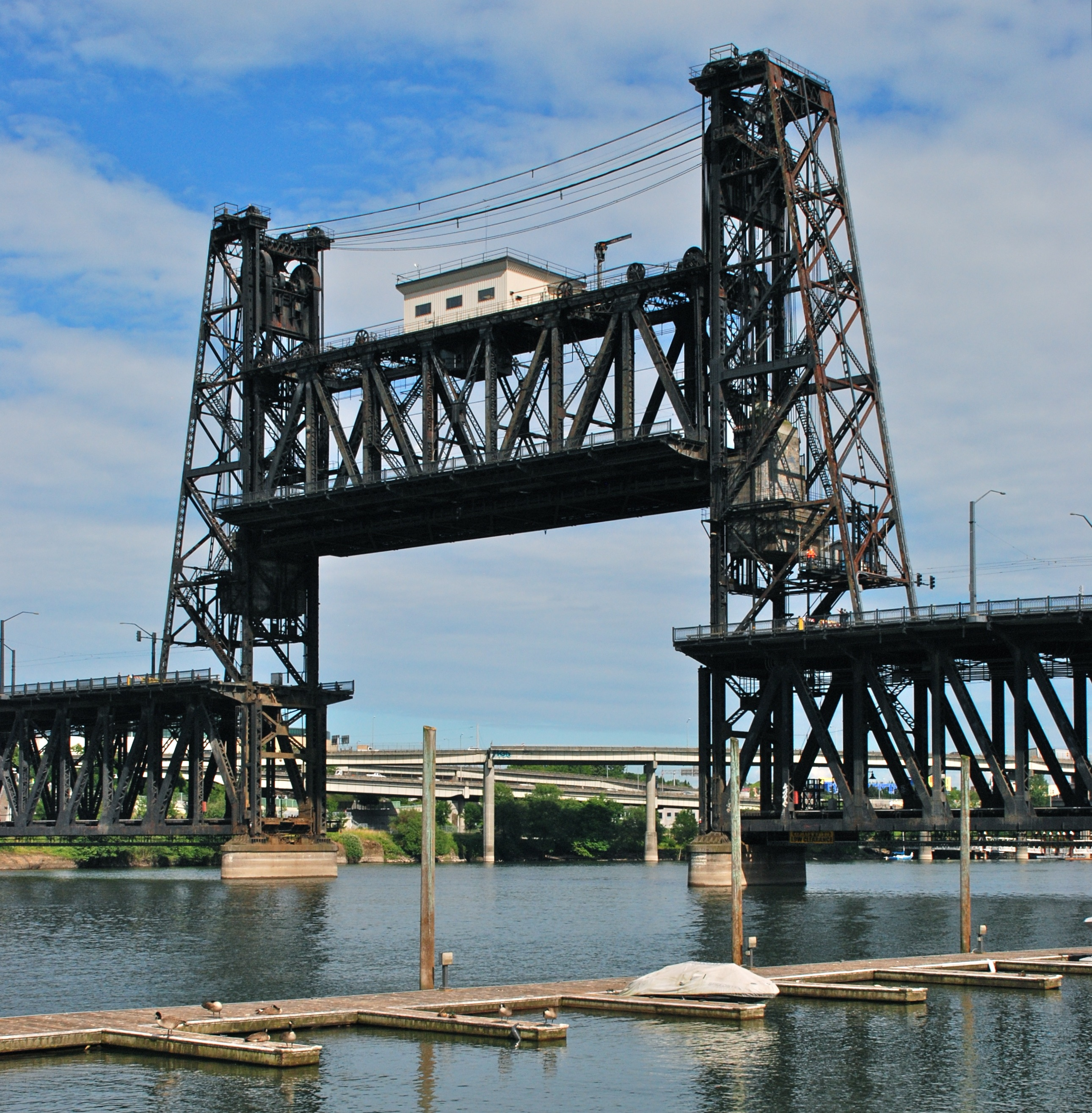
With lower deck telescoped into upper deck and lift span almost fully raised

The Steel Bridge is a through truss, double-deck vertical-lift bridge across the Willamette River in Portland, Oregon, United States, opened in 1912. Its lower deck carries railroad and bicycle/pedestrian traffic, while the upper deck carries road traffic (on the Pacific Highway West No. 1W, former Oregon Route 99W), and light rail (MAX), making the bridge one of the most multimodal in the world. It is the only double-deck bridge with independent lifts in the world and the second oldest vertical-lift bridge in North America, after the nearby Hawthorne Bridge. The bridge links the Rose Quarter and Lloyd District in the east to Old Town Chinatown neighborhood in the west.

== History ==
The bridge was completed in 1912 and replaced the previous Steel Bridge built in 1888 as a double-deck swing-span bridge. The 1888 structure was the first railroad bridge across the Willamette River in Portland. Its name originated because steel, instead of wrought iron, was used in the original bridge's construction, which was very unusual for the time. When the current Steel Bridge opened, it was simply given its predecessor's name.

The bridge was designed by the engineering firm of Waddell & Harrington, which was based in Kansas City, Missouri, but also had an office in Portland. The structure was built by Union Pacific Railroad and the Oregon-Washington Railroad and Navigation Company (OWR&N) at a cost of $1.7 million (equivalent to $57 million in 2025). It opened in July 1912 to rail traffic and on August 9, 1912, to automobiles.

The 1888 Steel Bridge (upper deck) had been crossed by horse-drawn streetcars from the time of its opening and then by the city's first electric streetcar line starting in November 1889. When the present Steel Bridge opened in 1912, the streetcar lines (all electric by then) moved to it, starting on September 8, 1912. Streetcar service across the Steel continued until August 1, 1948, when the last car lines using it, the Alberta and Broadway Lines, were abandoned. A single line of Portland's once-extensive trolley bus system also used the bridge; the Williams Avenue line crossed the Steel Bridge from 1937 until October 9, 1949. (Many years later, in 1986, electric transit vehicles returned to the bridge in the form of MAX Light Rail and later the Portland Vintage Trolley.)

The lower deck of the bridge was threatened by major floods in 1948, 1964, and 1996. The bridge was closed for three days because of the danger during the February 1996 floods.

In 1950, the Steel Bridge and its newly reconstructed approaches became part of a new U.S. 99W highway connecting Harbor Drive and Interstate Avenue.

In the 1960s, the bridge was sought for use by Interstate 5, which was later moved to the Marquam Bridge. Construction of the freeway instead brought the addition to the Steel Bridge of a new viaduct leading onto I-84 from the bridge's eastbound lanes.

In 1972, the bridge became part of Route 99W, replacing the US 99W designation. Harbor Drive, and by extension the ramps onto it from the bridge, was demolished from 1972 to 1974. It was replaced by Tom McCall Waterfront Park.

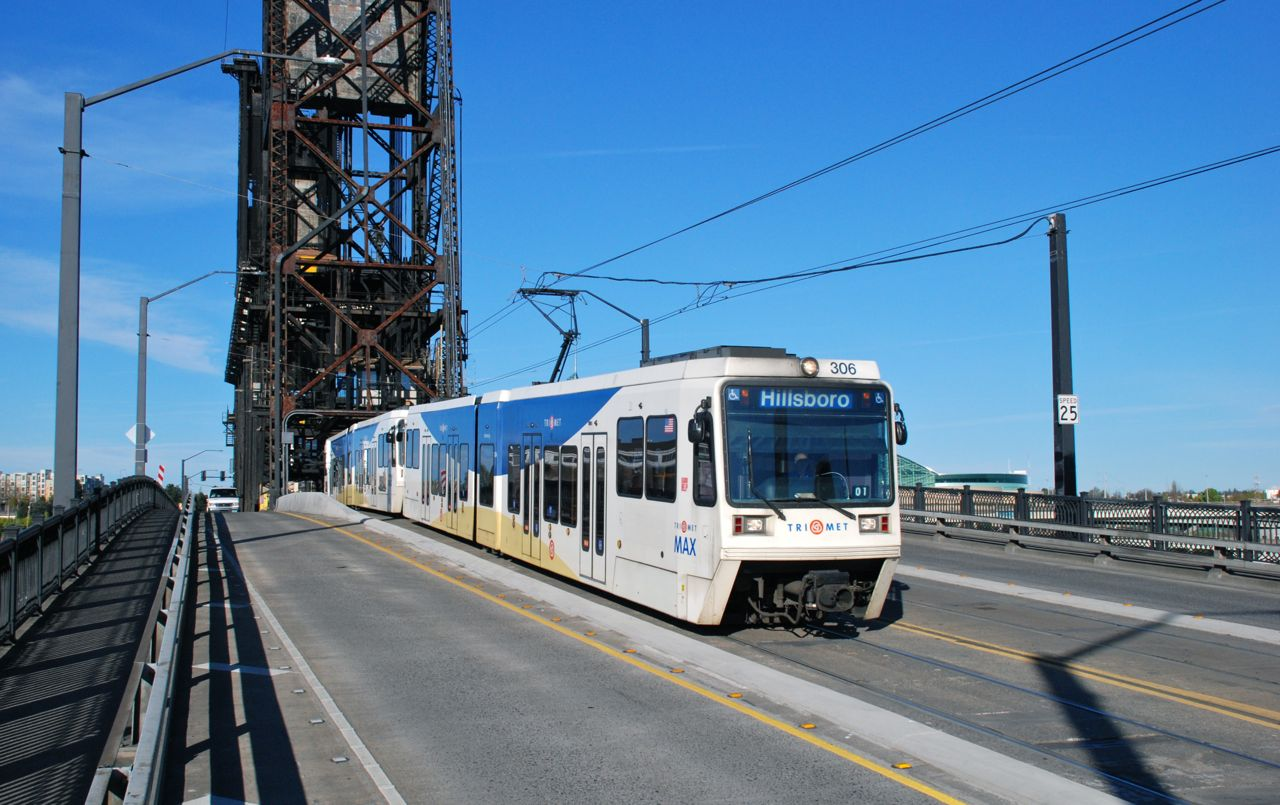
A westbound MAX Blue Line train crossing the bridge in 2009. Four of the five MAX lines cross the Steel Bridge. More than 600 MAX trips cross the bridge each weekday.

In the mid-1980s, the bridge underwent a $10 million renovation, including construction of the MAX light rail line of TriMet. Beginning in June 1984, the span was closed to all traffic for two years. It reopened on May 31, 1986. Completion and testing of the light-rail tracks and overhead wires across the bridge took place during the next three months and the light rail line opened for service on September 5, 1986. The renovation also saw the crossing gates blocking the roadway and sidewalks during raising of the upper-deck lift replaced and automated. For the current bridge's first 72 years, the gates had been manually operated, rotated horizontally across the roadway by two "gate tenders", one on each side of the lift span. Small shacks for the gatekeepers were positioned on the roadway deck, between the inner and outer traffic lanes, but these were removed during the 1980s rebuilding and replaced by a new gate tender house positioned above the roadway, in the west lift tower. Powered crossing gates replaced the manual ones, and operation of the gates is now controlled remotely, by the bridge operator.

A single-lane viaduct that connected the bridge's east approach to another viaduct (still in existence) that takes traffic from southbound Interstate 5 to Interstate 84 was closed in 1988 and was demolished in 1989, as part of roadway changes intended to improve traffic flow around the Oregon Convention Center. The center was under construction at that time and opened in 1990.

In 2001, a 220-foot-long (67 m) and 8-foot-wide (2.4 m) cantilevered walkway was installed on the southern side of the bridge's lower deck as part of the Eastbank Esplanade construction, raising the number of publicly accessible walkways across the bridge to three, including the two narrow sidewalks on the upper deck. The bridge is owned by Union Pacific with the upper deck leased to Oregon Department of Transportation, and subleased to TriMet, while the City of Portland is responsible for the approaches.

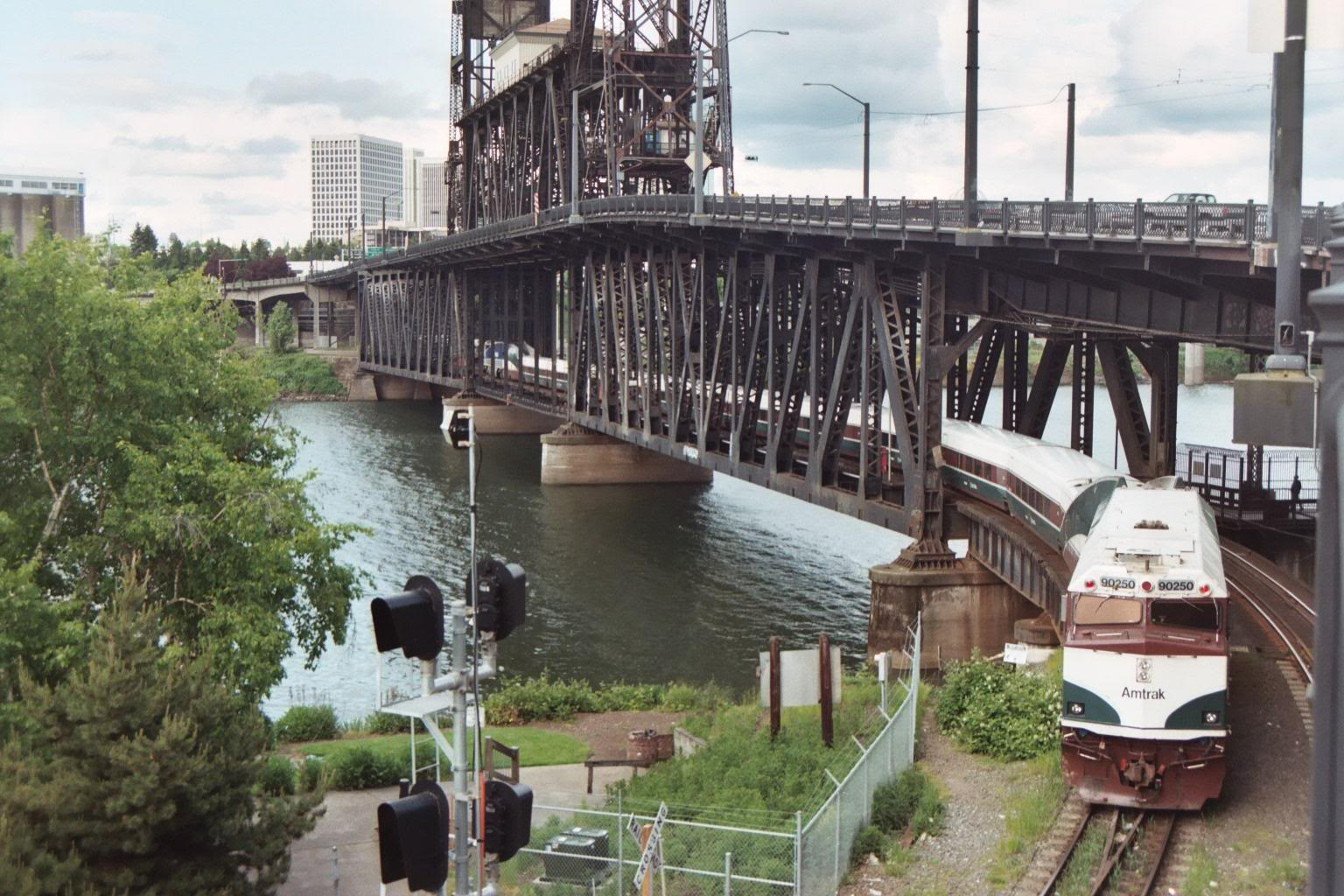
An Amtrak Cascades train crossing the bridge

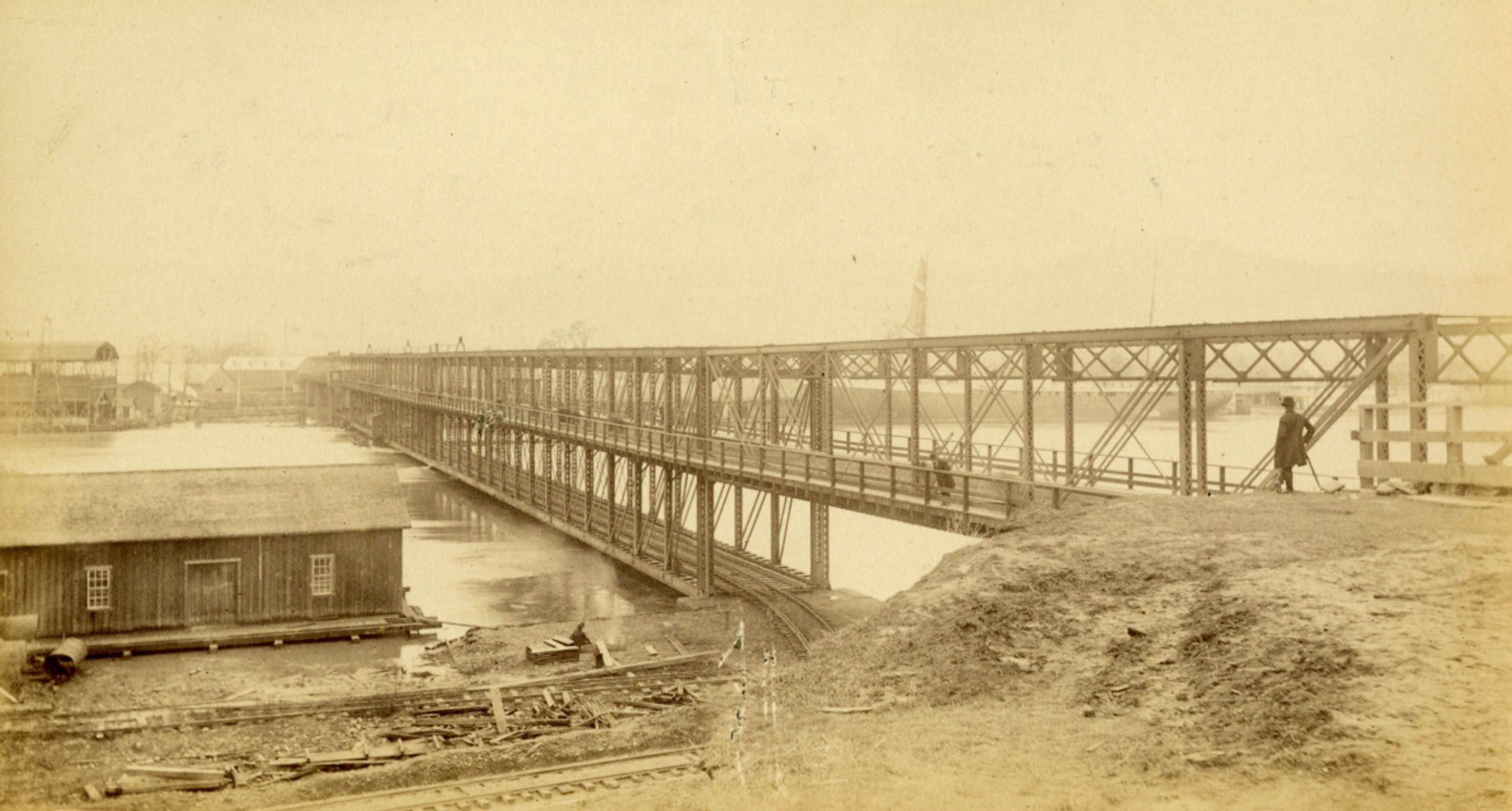
c1890 photo of the original steel bridge photographed from the east end

The average daily traffic in 2000 was 23,100 vehicles (including many TriMet buses), 200 MAX trains, 40 freight and Amtrak trains, and 500 bicycles. The construction of the lower-deck walkway connected to the Eastbank Esplanade resulted in a sharp increase in bicycle traffic, with over 2,100 daily bicycle crossings in 2005. MAX traffic has tripled since 2000, when only the Gresham–Hillsboro line (now the Blue Line) was using the bridge, to 605 daily crossings (weekdays) as of 2012. This resulted from the addition of three more MAX lines during that period: the Red, Yellow, Green Lines.

In the summer of 2008, the upper deck was closed for three weeks to allow a junction to be built at the west end connecting the existing MAX tracks with a new MAX line on the Portland Transit Mall. A change made at that time was that the two inner lanes became restricted to MAX trains only, with cars, buses and other motorized traffic permitted only in the two outer lanes.

In 2012, the Steel Bridge celebrated its 100th birthday. The Oregonian called it the "hardest-working" bridge on the Willamette River: "Cars, trucks, freight trains, buses, Amtrak, MAX, pedestrians, bicycles — you carry it all."

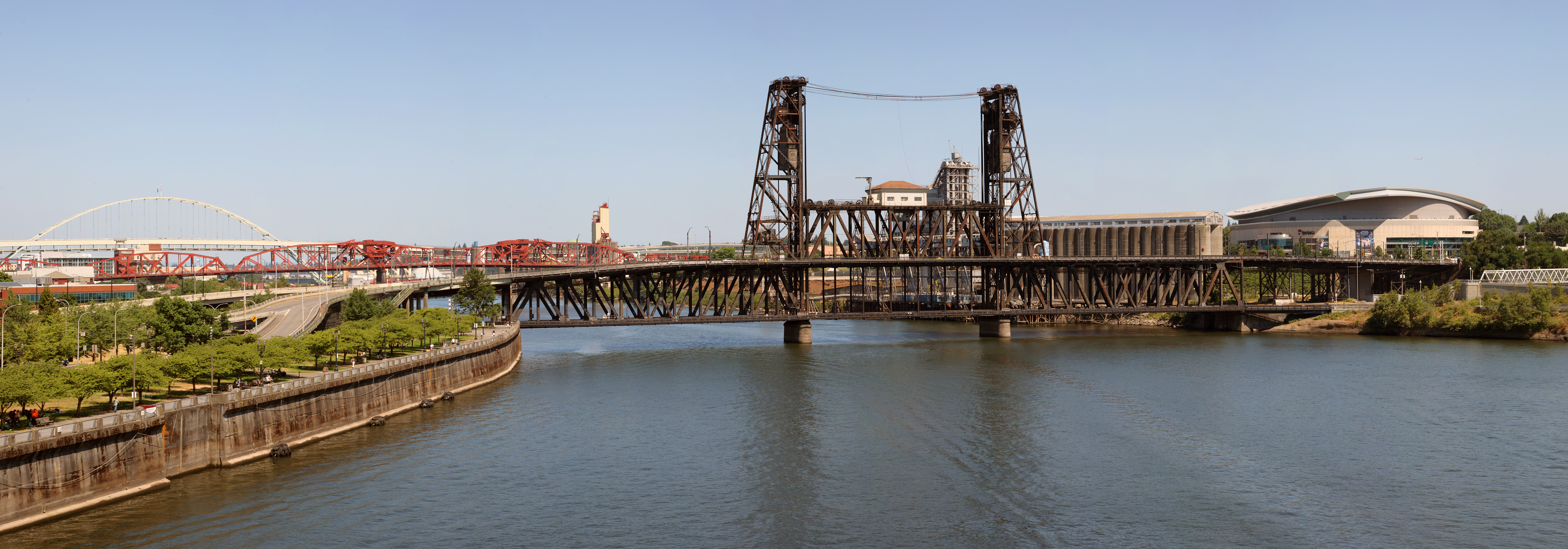
Steel Bridge panorama: at right is the Moda Center. Also visible in the background are the Fremont and Broadway bridges.

== Structure and lift operation ==
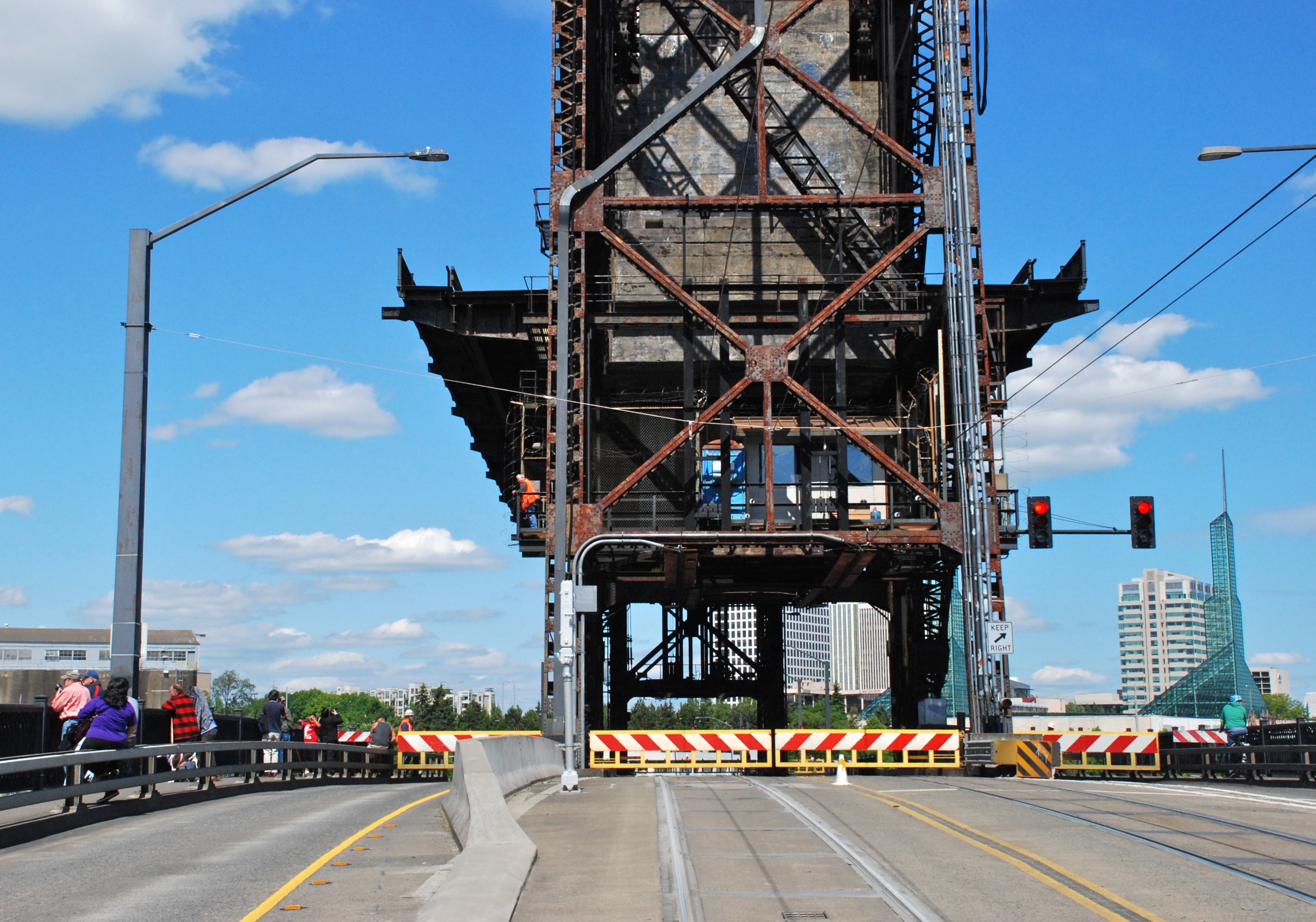
View from roadway during a lift-span opening

The lift span of the bridge is 211 feet (64 m) long. At low river levels, the lower deck is 26 feet (7.9 m) above the water, and 163 feet (50 m) of vertical clearance is provided when both decks are raised. Because of the independent lifts, the lower deck can be raised to 72 feet (22 m), telescoping into the upper deck but not disturbing it. Each deck has its own counterweights, two for the upper and eight for the lower, totaling 9 million pounds (4,500 short tons; 4,100 metric tons).

The machinery house sits atop the upper-deck lift truss. The operator's room is suspended from the top of the lift-span truss, directly below the machinery house, so that the operator can view river traffic as well as the upper deck. After the 2001 addition of a pedestrian walkway on the lower deck, cameras and closed-circuit television monitors were added to allow the operator to view the lower-deck walkway.

== Incidents ==
=== 2011 infrastructure spending protests ===
In November 2011, demonstrators lined the Steel Bridge to try to raise awareness about funding cuts for infrastructure maintenance in Portland and the overall state of the bridge. The bridge had been rated as being structurally deficient by an independent advocacy group, and the demonstrators had intended to use it as a symbol of decaying infrastructure in Oregon more broadly.

=== 2014 tightrope walking incident ===
Early in the morning of August 2, 2014, a man was seen attempting to tightrope walk across the steel cables used to help raise and lower the bridge's lift span, which are roughly 270 feet high. Bystanders, who suspected that the man was either suicidal or under the influence of drugs, contacted local authorities and the bridge's operation was shut down. The man appeared to take a photo of the sunrise before continuing to walk across the cables and then climbing down. Police later identified the man as 21-year-old Benjamin Lovitz of Portland, who was charged with trespassing and disorderly conduct.

=== 2024 freight train derailment ===
In the morning of April 29, 2024, several cars from a Union Pacific train derailed near the east end of the bridge. The bridge was shut down for several hours before reopening to traffic later that day.

== See also ==
- List of bridges documented by the Historic American Engineering Record in Oregon
- List of crossings of the Willamette River
- Steel Bridge Skatepark
