= Creston-Kenilworth, Portland, Oregon =

Creston-Kenilworth
- Neighborhood
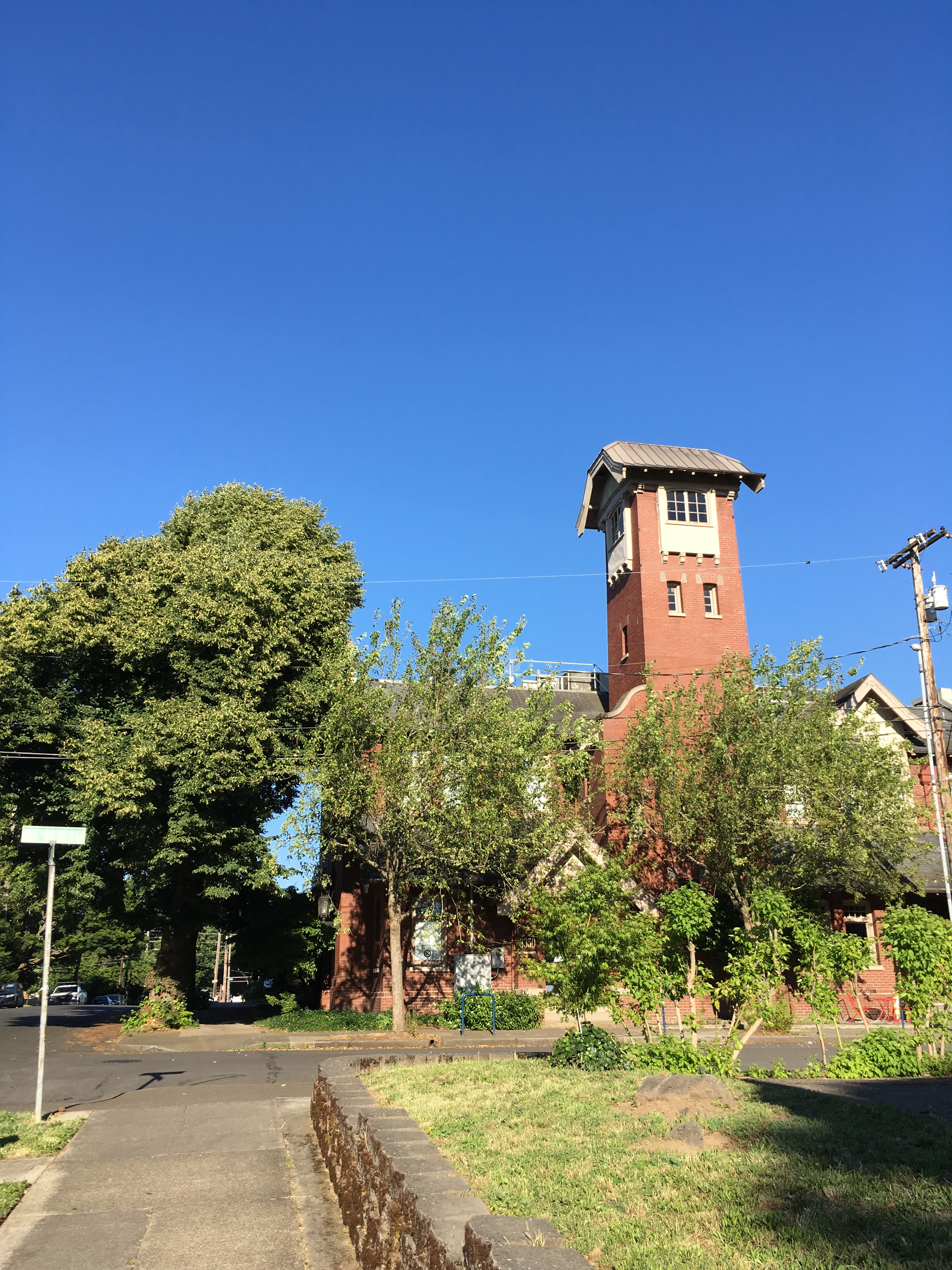
- Interactive map of Creston-Kenilworth
- Coordinates: 45°29′36″N 122°37′22″W
- Country: United States
- State: Oregon
- City: Portland

Government
  - Association: Creston-Kenilworth Neighborhood Association
  - Coalition: Southeast Uplift

Area
  - Total: 0.80 sq mi (2.08 km^{2})

Population (2020)
  - Total: 9,046
  - Density: 11,300/sq mi (4,350/km^{2})

Housing
  - No. of households: 4103
  - Occupancy rate: 95.7% occupied
  - Owner-occupied: 46%
  - Renting: 54%
  - Avg. household size: 2.2 persons

Creston-Kenilworth is a neighborhood in the Southeast section of Portland, Oregon, lying between SE 26th Ave. on the west and SE Foster Rd. (to SE 61st Ave.) on the east, and between SE Powell Blvd. on the north and SE Holgate Blvd. on the south. It is adjacent to the neighborhoods of Brooklyn to the west, Hosford-Abernethy, and Richmond to the north, Foster-Powell and Mt. Scott-Arleta to the east, and Reed and Woodstock to the south.

Parks include Creston Park (1920) and Kenilworth Park (1909).

According to Portland Parks & Recreation, the Kenilworth neighborhood was platted in 1889 and is "named after Sir Walter Scott's 1821 novel Kenilworth, a romantic novel set in Elizabethan England. Many of the streets in the neighborhood took their names from this novel and other novels by Scott."

== Demographics ==
In 2020, 9,046 people lived in Creston-Kenilworth, up 10% from 8,227 in 2010. 74% of people identified as white, 10.0% as Asian, 4.9% as Black or African American, 3.4% identified as American Indian or Alaska Native, 0.8% as Native Hawaiian or Pacific Islander, and 7.6% as some other race. 9.5% identified as Hispanic or Latino (any race). The median age in Creston-Kenilworth was 35.5. The median household income was listed at $68,000 and 23% of the neighborhood was covered by tree canopy. 70% of eligible residents voted in the 2020 general election.
