= Hayhurst, Portland, Oregon =

Hayhurst
- Neighborhood
- Street Sign Topper
- Interactive map of Hayhurst
- Coordinates: 45°28′52″N 122°43′31″W
- Country: United States
- State: Oregon
- City: Portland

Government
  - Association: Hayhurst Neighborhood Association
  - Coalition: District Four Coalition

Area
  - Total: 1.14 sq mi (2.95 km^{2})

Population (2000)
  - Total: 5,185
  - Density: 4,550/sq mi (1,760/km^{2})

Housing
  - No. of households: 2231
  - Occupancy rate: 97% occupied
  - Owner-occupied: 1452 households (65%)
  - Renting: 779 households (35%)
  - Avg. household size: 2.32 persons

Hayhurst is a residential neighborhood in the southwest section of Portland, Oregon, on the border with (and in some areas slightly extending into) Washington County. It borders Raleigh Hills and Beaverton (on the west), and the Portland neighborhoods of Bridlemile (on the north) along OR 10, Hillsdale (on the east), and Maplewood and Multnomah (on the south).

The community of Vermont Hills lies within the neighborhood (45°28′39″N 122°43′37″W).

In the western part of the neighborhood was Alpenrose Dairy (1916). It formerly featured a velodrome, baseball park, and replica Western frontier town ("Dairyville"). In February 2021, the property was closed to events and all other uses. The dairy was demolished in May 2025 as part of the Raleigh Crest development.

There are two SWTrails PDX that go through Hayhurst. The incomplete SW Trail 2 (Red Electric Line Trail) traverses east west, while SW Trail 7 runs north south.

== History ==
The neighborhood is named after Hayhurst School which is named after Elizabeth Hayhurst, the first president of the Oregon Parent Teacher Association in the early 1900s. The Red Electric Line ran through Hayhurst from 1914 to 1929.

== Notable residents ==
- James H. Allen - Rusty Nails the clown and TV host, inspiration for Simpsons character Krusty the Clown

== Parks ==
Pendleton Park (1955) is a green space with a playground, a baseball diamond, the Vermont Hills Community Garden, and an 8-foot rabbit sculpture entitled Vincent, Waiting for Alice by Keith Jellum. It is adjacent to Hayhurst Elementary School.

Gabriel Park and the Southwest Community Center border Hayhurst to the south.
