= Grindline Skateparks =

American skatepark build company

- Industry: Architecture
- Founded: 2002
- Founders: Mark Hubbard; Dave Palmer
- Headquarters: Seattle, United States
- Area served: Worldwide
- Products: Skateparks design
- Number of employees: 32
- Website: grindline.com

Grindline Skateparks is an American company that designs and builds skateboard parks. It has designed and built over 400 skateparks worldwide, including the second largest skatepark in America, Spring Park Texas.

== History ==
Mark Hubbard was working as a pool-building contractor. He helped with the construction of the Burnside Skatepark in Portland. Living in Seattle, he started to turn his friends' pools into half-pipes, and eventually created Grindline Skateparks with cofounder Dave Palmer. Grindline Skateparks was incorporated in 2002 by Mark Hubbard, who managed the company until his death on 8 June 2018.

In August 2014, Grindline Skateparks inaugurated the Spring Skatepark in Greenspoint, Texas, one of the world's largest skateparks.

In 2018, Grindline completely remodeled the Humboldt Avenue Skatepark in Chico. Tony Hawk shared his plan to copy the new Chico bowl at the Wilmington Skatepark he is developing.

== Description ==
Grindline Skateparks is specialized in building free-form shaped deep pools. Its creation process includes co-designing the skate parks with the local skaters. The company is based in Seattle.

The company has 32 employees (2018).

== Skateparks built ==
Photo	Name	Location	Year	Description
	Scott Stamnes Memorial Skate Park	Orcas Island		
	Rotary Skate Park	Brainbridge Island		Size: 14,000 square feet
	Spring Skatepark	Greenspoint		Size: 78,000 square feet
	Lee and Joe Jamail Skatepark	Houston		
	Pitcher Park Memorial Skate Park	Pittsburgh	2013	Size: 17,000 square feet Budget: $600,000 (co-financed by the Tony Hawk Foundation)
	Ogden Skatepark	Ogden	2017	Budget: $543,000 (co-financed by the Tony Hawk Foundation)
	Union Gap Skatepark	Union Gap		Budget: $192,000
	Kiwanis Skatepark	Lakewood		Size: 12,000 square feet
	Prosser Skatepark	Prosser		Size: 3,600 square feet
	Kapa‘a Skatepark	Kapa‘a, Kaua‘i, Hawaii‘i	2020	Size: 6,000 square feet Budget: $250,00
	Riverside Park Skatepark	Detroit	2021	Size: 15,000 square feet Budget: $800,000

|Bennington Skate Park Project |Bennington, VT |2025
