= Maplewood, Portland, Oregon =

Maplewood
- Neighborhood
- Interactive map of Maplewood
- Coordinates: 45°28′19″N 122°43′53″W
- Country: United States
- State: Oregon
- City: Portland

Government
  - Association: Maplewood Neighborhood Association
  - Coalition: District 4 Coalition

Area
  - Total: 0.62 sq mi (1.61 km^{2})

Population (2000)
  - Total: 2,558
  - Density: 4,120/sq mi (1,590/km^{2})

Housing
  - No. of households: 1021
  - Occupancy rate: 97% occupied
  - Owner-occupied: 838 households (82%)
  - Renting: 183 households (18%)
  - Avg. household size: 2.51 persons

Maplewood is a suburban neighborhood in Southwest Portland, Oregon, United States.

== Location ==
Maplewood is on Portland's western border with Garden Home and on Multnomah County's western border with Washington County. (Small portions of the neighborhood, and thus the city of Portland, extend into Washington County.) The neighborhood is defined as the area west of SW 45th Avenue to the city limit (at approximately SW 66th Avenue), between SW Vermont Street (the northern edge) and SW Multnomah Boulevard (the southern edge). There are many knolls and rolling hills in the neighborhood. Two tributaries of the Tualatin River and Fanno Creek traverse the area: Woods Creek and Vermont Creek. There are extensive green spaces. The street grid does not conform to that of Portland due to the topography. Some streets conform to the grid but dead end. Namesake Maplewood Road curves from the intersection with SW 45th Avenue and SW Multnomah Boulevard until it becomes SW 52nd Avenue near Maplewood Elementary School. The Ashcreek neighborhood borders to the south, Hayhurst to the north, Multnomah to the east, and Garden Home–Whitford CDP in unincorporated Washington County to the west.

== Business ==
Maplewood is almost exclusively a residential neighborhood with most commercial businesses along its outer edge; however, it includes several small businesses like within its borders.

== Neighborhood attractions ==
Well-hidden April Hill park contains a play structure, a soccer field, and a few trails leading to Woods Creek. Across 45th Ave from the neighborhood on its Northern corner is Gabriel Park and the Southwest Community Center. Just outside the neighborhood's Western edge is the Garden Home Recreation Center.

== Worship ==
The only church in the center of the neighborhood is West Hills Friends Church (a Quaker church, Oregon Meeting). There are several churches on the outskirts of Maplewood: St. Luke Lutheran Church (ELCA) and St. John Fisher Catholic Church near Vermont or 45th Avenue, and Multnomah Presbyterian Church on 45th Avenue.

== Education ==
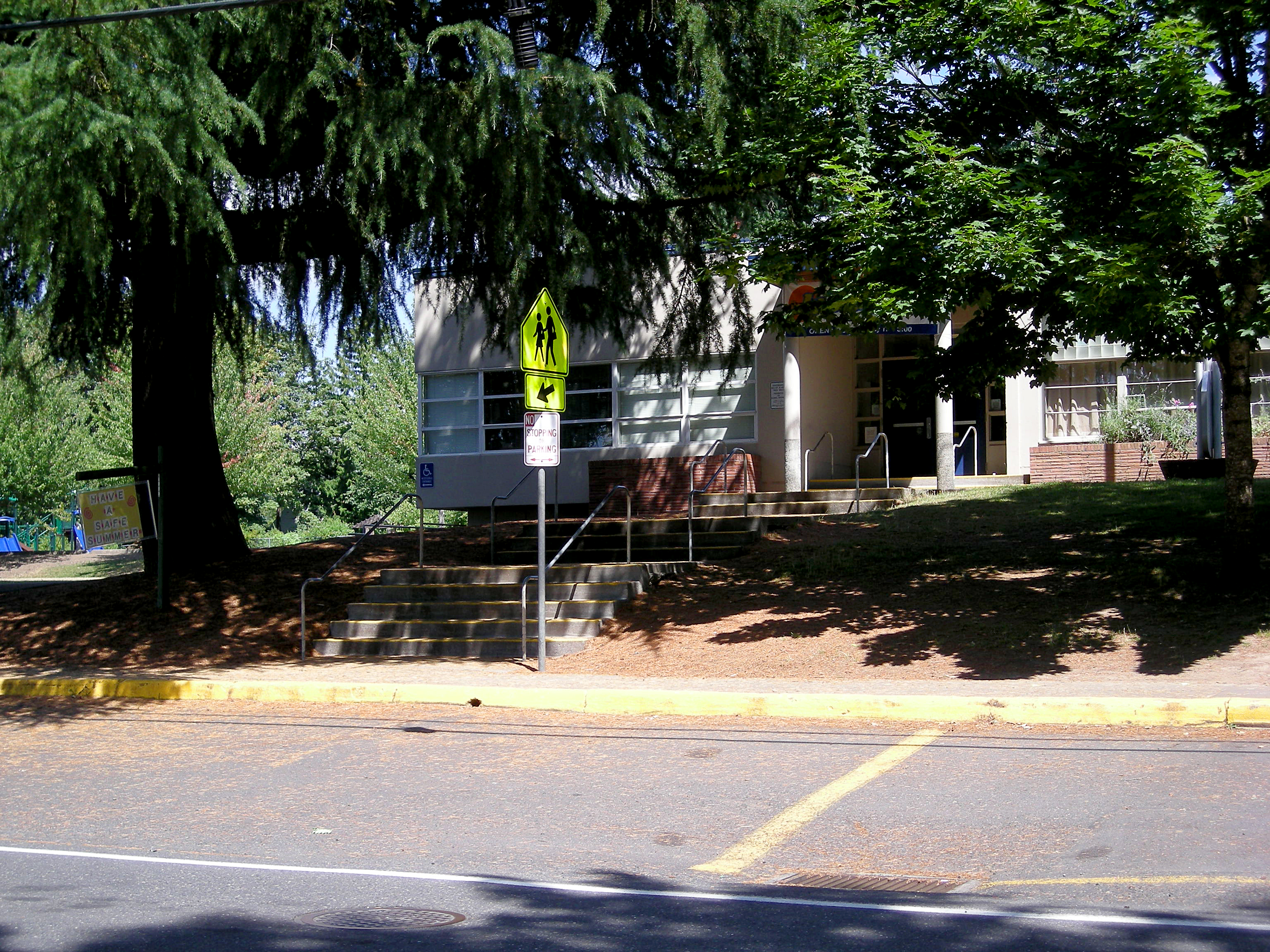
Maplewood Elementary School

There are several elementary schools in the neighborhood: Maplewood Elementary School, a K-5 school in the Portland Public Schools district, and St. John Fisher, a Roman Catholic school.

Maplewood residents may attend Portland Public Schools Jackson Middle School (grades 6–8) and Ida B. Wells-Barnett High School (grades 9–12) near the neighborhood.

== Neighborhood association ==
Maplewood has a small but active neighborhood association.
