= Pitcher Park Memorial Skate Park =

Coordinates: 40.40441°N 80.07355°W

- Founded: July 16th, 2008
- Founder: Mary Pitcher
- Purpose: Extreme sports, childhood obesity, and peace
- Location: Pittsburgh, Pennsylvania, US
- Region served: Allegheny County
- Method: Public Skatepark
- Members: c. 2,000
- Owner: Borough of Carnegie
- Key people: Mary Pitcher, Jonathan Pitcher, Brady Pitcher, Victoria Karabasz, Laurie Malka, Kim Lusardi
- Volunteers: 50
- Website: Pitcher Park.com

Pitcher Park Memorial Skate Park is a skatepark that was built in Carnegie, Pennsylvania. Members of the community of the South Hills of Pittsburgh undertook a grass roots effort to build this as a memorial to honor two brothers, Vincent and Stephen Pitcher, who drowned together on July 15, 2008, while on a camping trip at the Kinzua Dam next to the Allegheny Reservoir.

The skatepark located at Forsythe Road and Cook Lane is approximately 17,000-square-foot (1,600 m^{2}) concrete skatepark It is used by skateboarders, BMX bike riders, quad skaters & roller bladers.

Built by Grindline Skateparks of Seattle, Washington, this is the largest concrete skatepark near or in the city of Pittsburgh, Pennsylvania The skatepark boasts a full pipe that is 20 ft in diameter and 24 ft in length in between two bowls with a flowing street section with steps, rails, hubba ledges, quarter pipes, and granite ledges. The location in Carnegie Park, is very accessible by public transportation and located directly off the Parkway West and Interstate 79. This park has become a great asset to many youth & young adults who skateboard, etc. in the surrounding areas.

The Tony Hawk Foundation acknowledged the efforts of this community project with a $10,000 grant initially through NewSunRising.org 501c3 who was the sponsor of this grant. Initially, Pitcher Park supporters tried to place this in Dormont, PA, the home town of Vincent & Stephen Pitcher but this effort was unsuccessful.

After six years, the park is nearing completion with the installation of lights for early evening skating. The skatepark will then be donated to the Borough of Carnegie.

Pitcher Park Memorial Skatepark organization is a Non-Profit & Public Charity.
