= Hidden Valley Discovery Park =

Hidden Valley The Puzzle Park
- Previously known as Tredidon Trails, Hidden Valley Discovery Park
- Interactive map of Hidden Valley The Puzzle Park
- Location: Tredidon, Launceston, Cornwall, England
- Coordinates: 50°38′13″N 4°26′7.2″W
- Opened: 1994
- Owner: Pete Jones
- Operating season: April to October
- Area: 60 acres (240,000 m^{2})
- Website: hiddenvalley.co.uk

Hidden Valley The Puzzle Park is a family-run visitor attraction near the town of Launceston, Cornwall, England, UK. Founded in 1994 by Pete Jones, as a simple treasure hunt and play area, the park has expanded to include a "Forbidden Mansion" with mazes and team treasure hunts. It also includes a 7 1/4 in (184 mm) gauge miniature railway system around the site, encouraging 11,000 visitors each year.

== History ==
The park was founded in 1994 as Tredidon Trails, originally just including a treasure hunt and children's play area. The founder was Pete Jones, an engineering graduate who took much inspiration from the famous British engineer Isambard Kingdom Brunel.

The park currently receives about 27,000 visitors each year and includes several treasure hunt trails, a miniature railway and mazes. The reception area which resembles a pumping station from the Victorian era includes a Cafe and gift shop. The Forbidden Mansion in the grounds includes Victorian fixtures and fittings, but has been designed to include secret passageways and upside down rooms. Inside the mansion there are several treasure hunts for teams to work through to gain a crystal in the style of Crystal Maze. In 2024 the 'Study' was added, a quick escape room style experience, along with an Ames room.

The park's 7 1/4 in (184 mm) gauge miniature railway is named Porterswick Junction Light Railway. It was constructed in 2002 and was extended in 2003 to form a complete 900 yard loop. The line now includes four bridges which go over the top, as well as an engine shed, inspection pit and two locomotives which operate at the site.

Type	No.	Name	Wheel arrangement	Builder	Built
Steam	-	William	0–6–0	Frank Birchall	2008
Diesel	01	Albert	0-4-0PH	Roanoke of Barnstaple	1998

== See also ==
- Ridable miniature railway
