= Burnside Bridge =

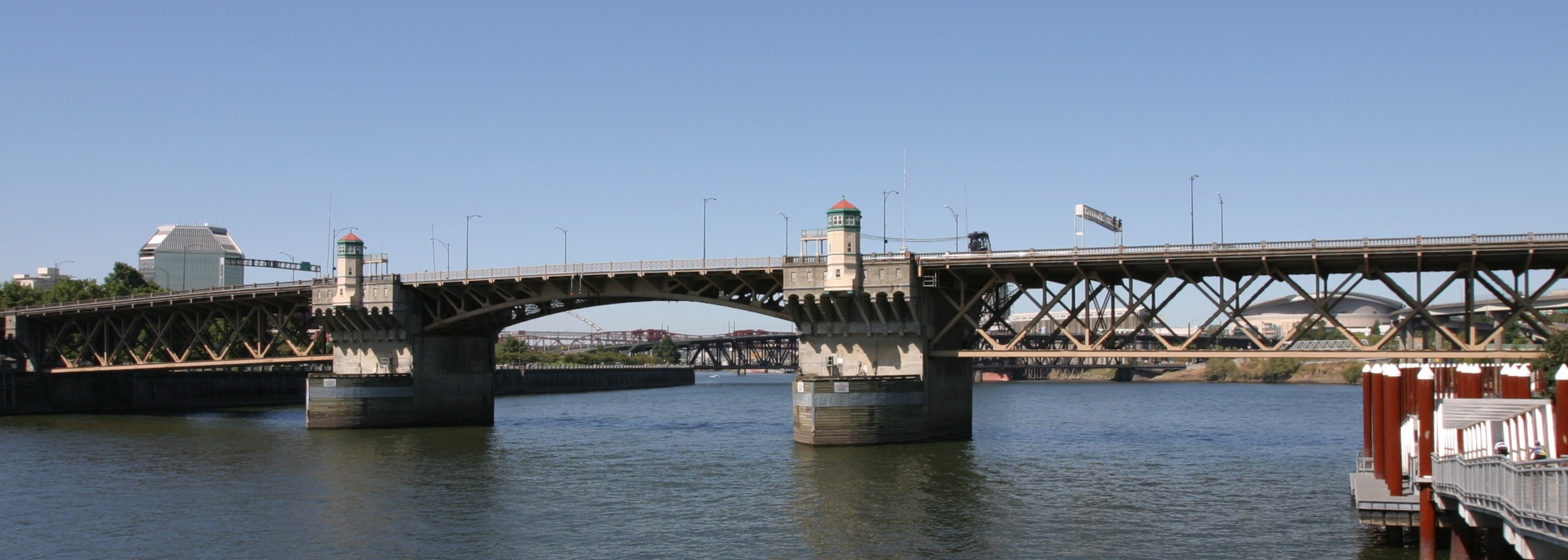
- Coordinates: 45°31′23″N 122°40′01″W
- Crosses: Willamette River
- Locale: Portland, Oregon
- Maintained by: Multnomah County
- ID number: 02757

Characteristics
- Design: Double-leaf "Strauss-type" bascule
- Total length: 1,382 ft (421 m)
- Width: 73.8 ft (22.5 m)
- Longest span: Fixed: 268 ft (82 m); Double-leaf bascule: 252 ft (77 m)
- Clearance below: 64 ft (20 m) closed

History
- Designer: Ira G. Hedrick; Robert E. Kremers
- Opened: May 28, 1926 (replaced 1894 bridge)
- Burnside Bridge
- U.S. National Register of Historic Places
- Location: Portland, Oregon; Willamette River at river mile 12.7
- MPS: Willamette River Highway Bridges of Portland, Oregon
- NRHP reference No.: 12000931
- Added to NRHP: November 14, 2012

The Burnside Bridge is a 1926-built bascule bridge that spans the Willamette River in Portland, Oregon, United States, carrying Burnside Street. It is the second bridge at the same site to carry that name. It was added to the National Register of Historic Places in November 2012.

== Design ==
The bridge was designed by Ira G. Hedrick and Robert E. Kremers, incorporating a bascule lift mechanism designed by Joseph Strauss.

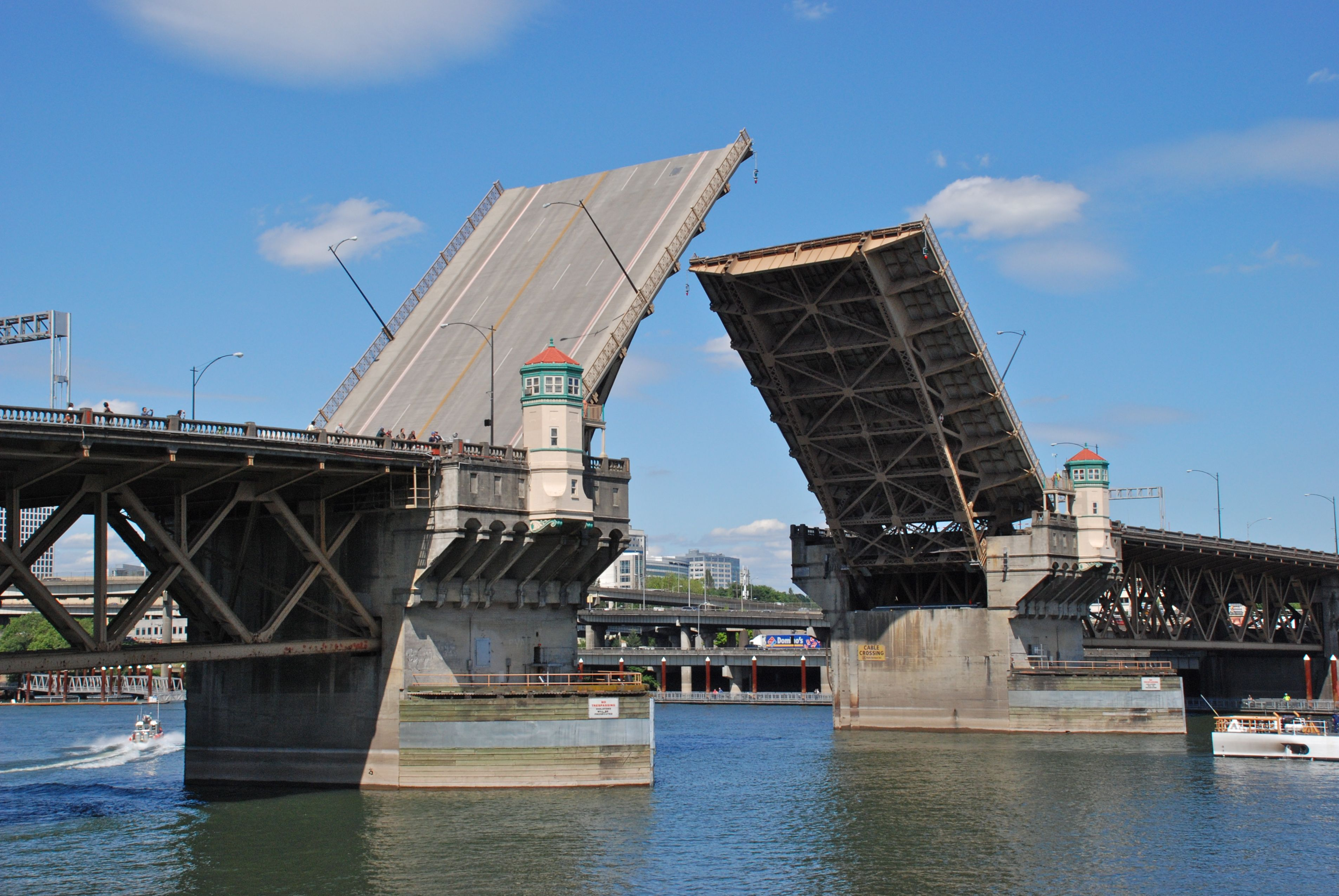
The bridge almost fully opened

Including approaches, the Burnside has a total length of 2,308 ft (703 m) and a 251 ft (77 m) center span. While lowered, this span is normally 64 ft (20 m) above the river. The deck is made of concrete, which contributes to its being one of the heaviest bascule bridges in the United States. The counterweights, housed inside the two piers, weigh 1,700 short tons (1,518 long tons; 1,542 t). The lifting is normally controlled by the Hawthorne Bridge operator, but an operator staffs the west tower during high river levels. As of 2005, the bridge opened for river traffic an average of 35 times a month.

The bridge provides shelter for the initially unauthorized Burnside Skatepark under the east end. On weekends, the Portland Saturday Market was held mostly under the bridge's west end for many years. The market was reoriented in 2009, but the Burnside Bridge continues to provide shelter for a few vendor stalls at the market's northern end.

== History ==
In 1891, Burnside Street was renamed from "B" street to take the name of Daniel Wyman Burnside, a local businessman who was a proponent of the 1866 dredging of the Willamette River. Construction of the original Burnside Bridge began in November 1892, and the bridge opened on July 4, 1894. It was a swing-span truss bridge made of wrought iron and steel.

The replacement was part of a $4.5 million bond that also included the construction of the Ross Island and Sellwood bridges. The public would later learn that the 1924 contract was given for $500,000 more than the lowest bid. Having moved the bridge location to profit by selling their land, three Multnomah County commissioners were recalled as a result of the scandal, and a new engineering company assumed control of the project. The Ku Klux Klan had backed the commissioners and enabled their system of kickbacks and grafts; the ensuing "rotten bridge scandal" removed much of their clout even by 1924.

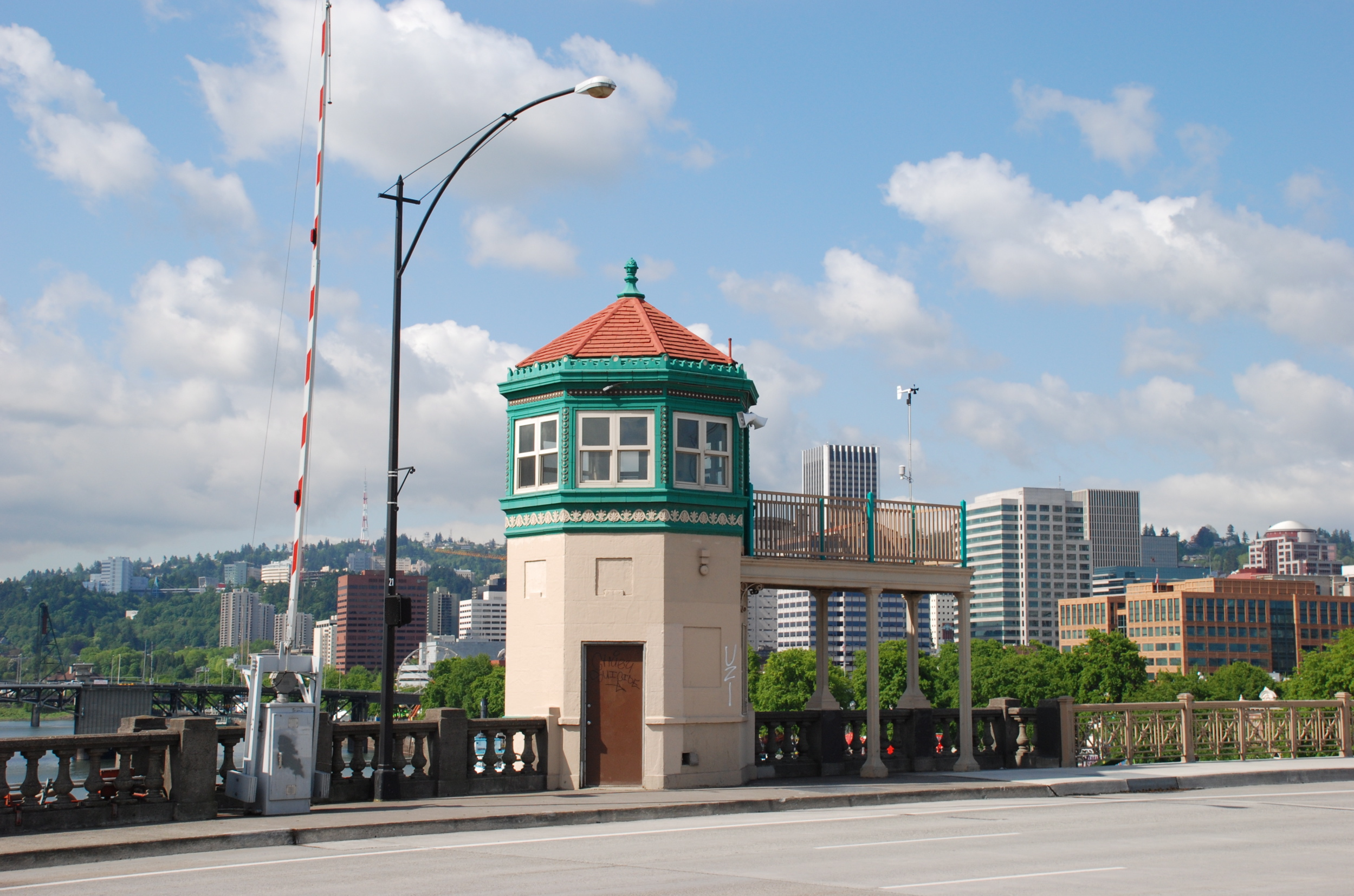
One of the bridge's two ornate towers

The bridge opened on May 28, 1926, at a final cost of $4.5 million (including approaches). It was the first Willamette River bridge in Portland designed with input from an architect. This led to the Italian Renaissance towers and decorative metal railings. The bascule system was designed by Joseph Strauss. The initial principal engineer for the bridge construction was the firm of Hedrick & Kremers. The bridge was then completed by Gustav Lindenthal, who also supervised its construction.

Streetcars crossed the Burnside Bridge until 1950, and electric trolleybuses serving the Sandy Blvd. route did so from 1936 to 1958. Currently, three TriMet bus routes use the bridge.

In the 1990s the Burnside Bridge was made a Regional Emergency Transportation Route, the one non-freeway bridge to be used by emergency vehicles. In 1995 one of the six lanes was removed to accommodate new bicycle lanes. From March until November 2002 the bridge underwent a $2.1 million seismic retrofit, making it the first bridge operated by Multnomah County to receive earthquake protection.

The bridge was under construction in 2006 in order to replace the deck. The electric streetcar tracks, abandoned in 1950, were visible during the construction. This project was budgeted at $9 million and the majority of the work was completed on December 9, 2007. The bridge was added to the National Register of Historic Places in November 2012.

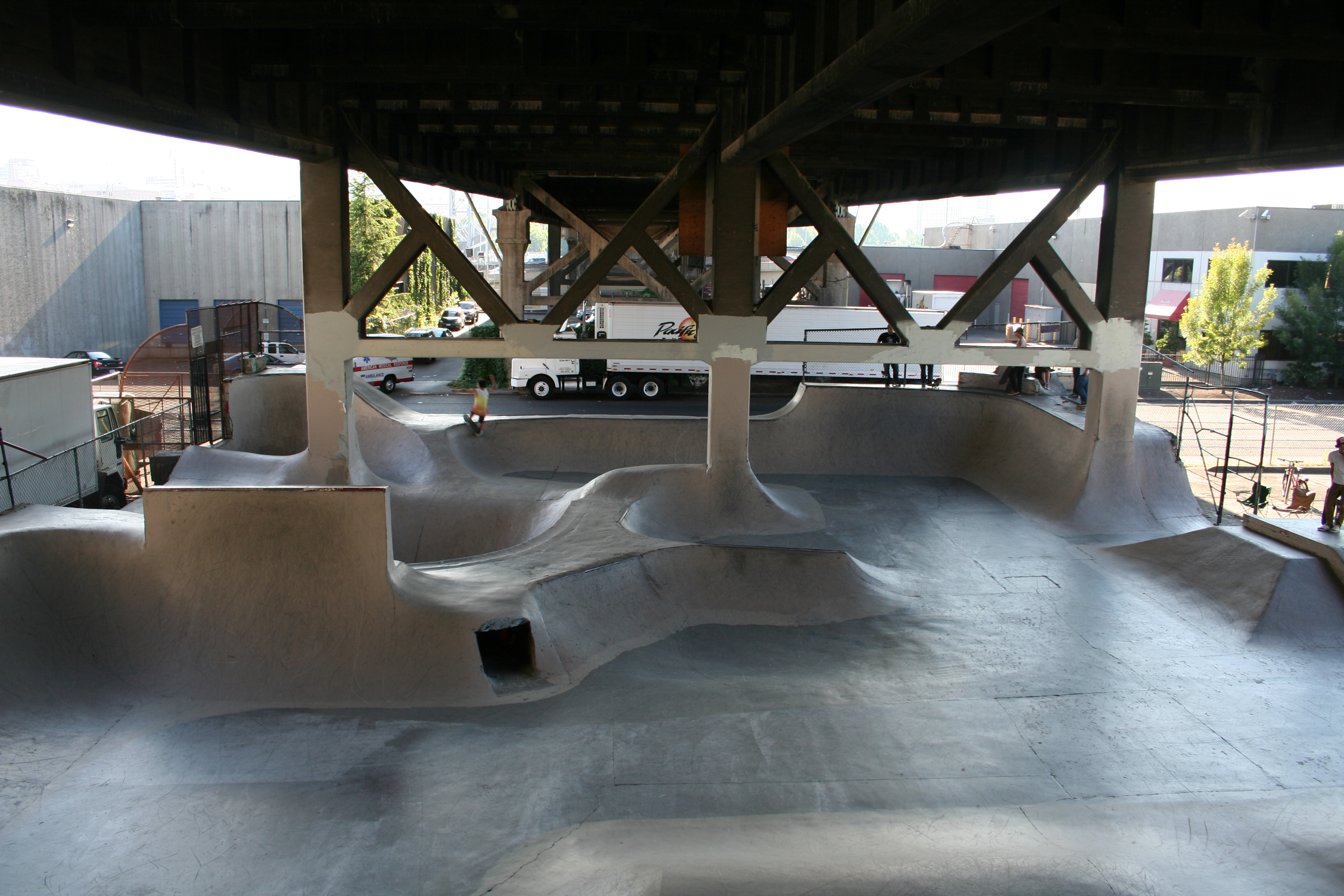
Burnside Skatepark

The Eastbank Esplanade, which opened in 2001, is connected to the bridge by stairs added during the esplanade's construction. However, because of the bridge's age, it cannot support any extra weight, so the stairways must be supported by separate pilings.

In 2020, the Earthquake Ready Burnside Bridge project deemed that the current short-span bridge would not survive a major earthquake, and recommended a replacement long-span bridge. Early concepts for the new bridge included designs that resembled nearby Willamette River bridges; the six finalists, organized into cable-stayed and tied-arch designs, were presented for a public vote in July 2024. The replacement is estimated to cost $895 million and has been delayed due to ongoing uncertainty of federal funds. No new start date has been determined.

== See also ==
- Joseph Strauss (engineer)
- List of bascule bridges
- List of bridges documented by the Historic American Engineering Record in Oregon
- List of bridges on the National Register of Historic Places in Oregon
- List of crossings of the Willamette River
