= Gabriel Park =

Public park in Portland, Oregon, U.S.

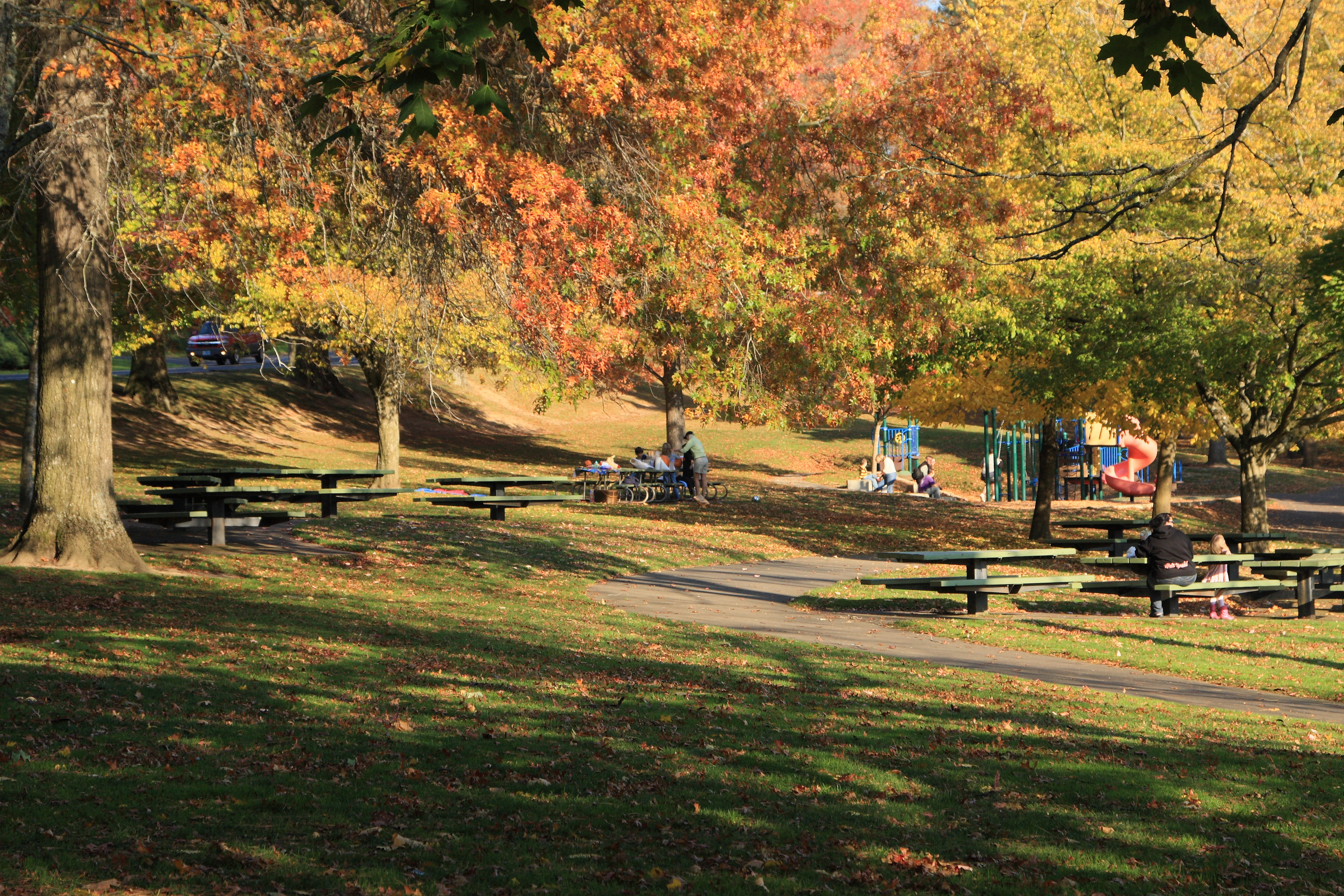
- Picnic area and playground, 2007
- Interactive map of Gabriel Park
- Type: Public, city
- Location: SW 45th Ave. and Vermont St. Portland, Oregon
- Coordinates: 45.474217°N 122.719155°W
- Area: 89.67 acres (36.29 ha)
- Created: October 1950
- Operator: Portland Parks & Recreation
- Status: Day use only (5 am - midnight)

Gabriel Park is a 90.65-acre (366,800 m^{2}) public park in Portland, Oregon, United States. It features a baseball field, softball field, soccer field, basketball courts, tennis courts, skatepark, volleyball courts, disabled access play area, disabled access restrooms, dog off-leash area, paved and unpaved paths, reservable picnic sites, and WiFi. The park is located between the Maplewood, Multnomah, and Hayhurst neighborhoods of Southwest Portland at 45th Avenue and Vermont Street.

The Southwest Community Center is located at the Northwest corner of Gabriel Park. Amenities include indoor swimming pool, indoor basketball court, fitness room, gymnasium, rock climbing wall, weight room, kitchen, meeting room, party room, and wireless Internet access.

== History ==
In October 1950, the Parks Bureau purchased an 87-acre (350,000 m^{2}) tract of land featuring two small creeks and wooded areas between Vermont and Canby Streets for $120,000. The land had been bought in 1890 by a Swiss immigrant named Ulrich Gabriel, who farmed this land and operated the Pine Creek Dairy as well. In July 1995, Portland Parks & Recreation offered a 1.75-acre (7,100 m^{2}) dog off-leash area on a six-month trial basis in Gabriel Park. The Southwest Community Center was funded by Measure 26-10 and opened in June 1999.

== Features and use ==
The park costs the city approximately $231,000 per year in maintenance.

=== Dog off-leash area ===
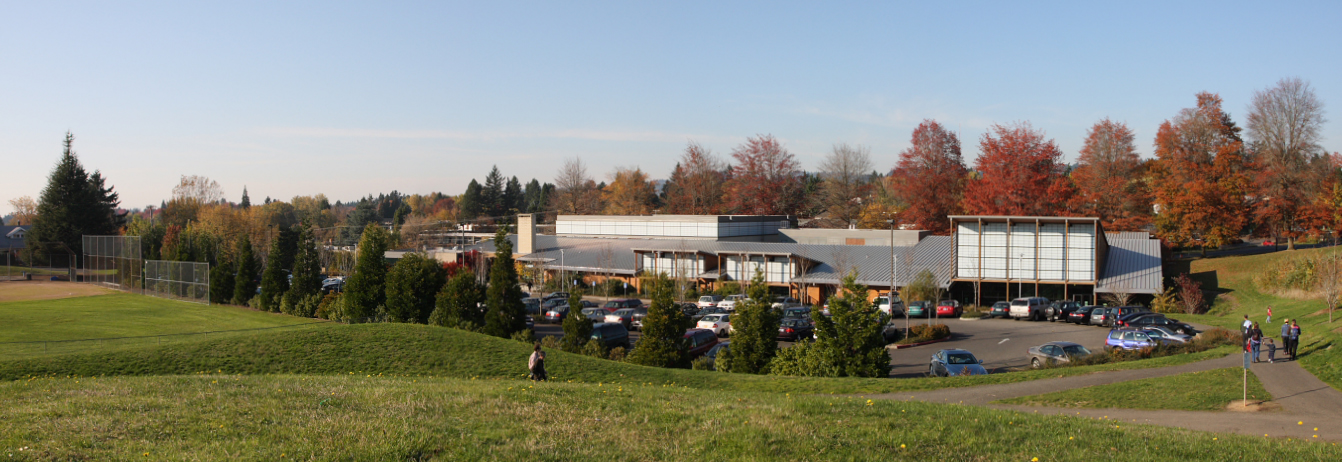
The Southwest Community Center

Gabriel Park includes two fenced, 1.75-acre (7,100 m^{2}) dog off-leash areas, one open for the winter season and one open for the summer. Water fountains, feces cleanup bags, picnic tables and benches help make these some of the area's most popular off-leash areas.

=== Skatepark ===
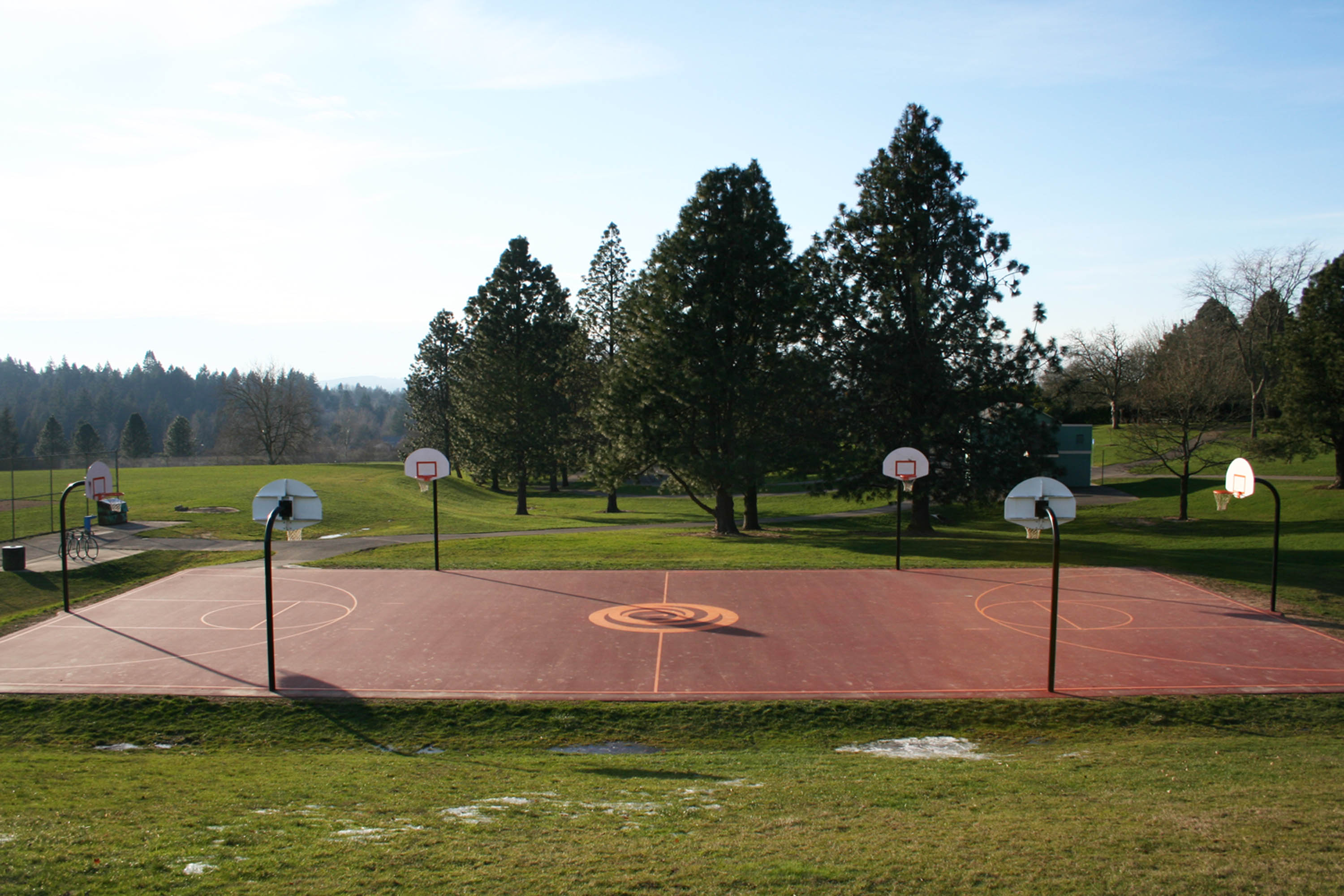
Basketball Courts inside the park

In November 2006, Portland Parks & Recreation Commissioner Dan Saltzman recommended funding for the construction of a skatepark at Gabriel Park. Later that month, the City Council approved the funding for the Gabriel Park Skatepark along with another skatepark at Ed Benedict Park in Southeast Portland. The skateparks grand opening was July 12, 2008. The design and construction of the park was done by Airspeed Skateparks of Reedsport, Oregon.

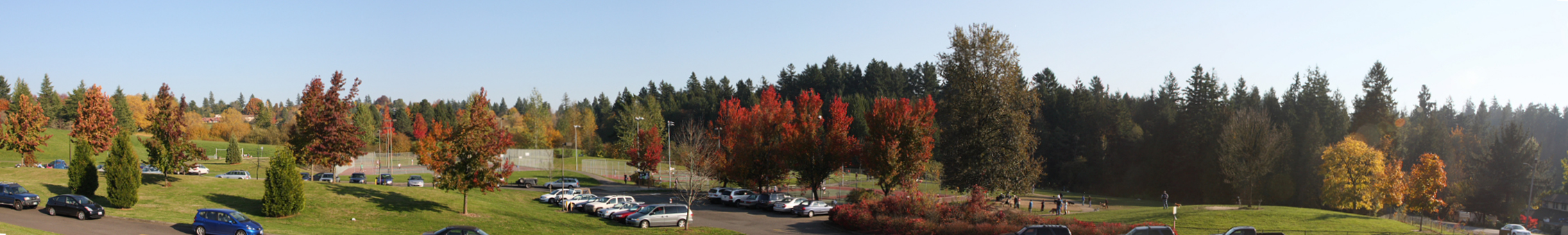
Features at west edge of park, looking south, from left to right: volleyball courts, tennis courts, dog off-leash area, 45th Street
