= Steel Bridge Skatepark =

Planned skatepark in Portland, Oregon, U.S.

- Location: Portland, Oregon, U.S.
- Location within Portland, Oregon
- Coordinates: 45°31′33″N 122°40′16″W

The Steel Bridge Skatepark is a planned 35,000-square-foot skatepark in Portland, Oregon, United States.

== See also ==
- Skateboarding in Portland, Oregon
