= Burnside Skatepark =

Skatepark in Portland, Oregon, U.S.

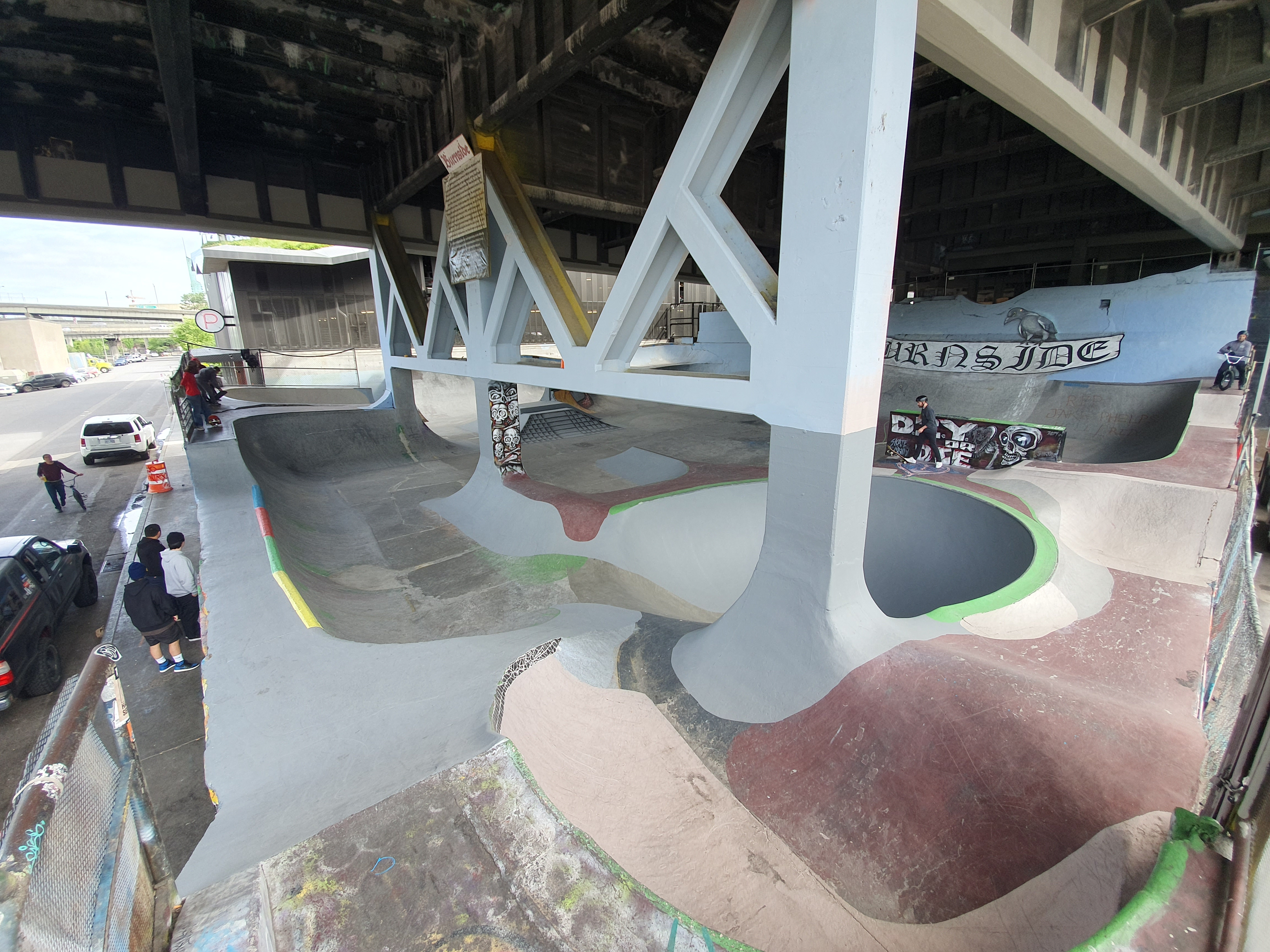
- The skatepark as of May 18, 2019. Taken from the southwest corner of the skatepark.
- Interactive map of Burnside Skatepark
- Type: DIY concrete skatepark
- Location: Burnside Bridge
- Nearest city: Portland, Oregon, U.S.
- Coordinates: 45.522964°N 122.663555°W
- Created: October 31, 1990

The Burnside Skatepark is a DIY concrete skatepark located in Portland, Oregon, United States. Burnside was the first DIY skatepark project. It is located under the east end of the Burnside Bridge. The project was started without permission from the city of Portland before being accepted as a public skatepark. Its features include many hips, pools, pyramids, and vertical sections. The skatepark receives no funding from the city of Portland. The park is regarded as an on-going project that is funded by donations.

== History ==
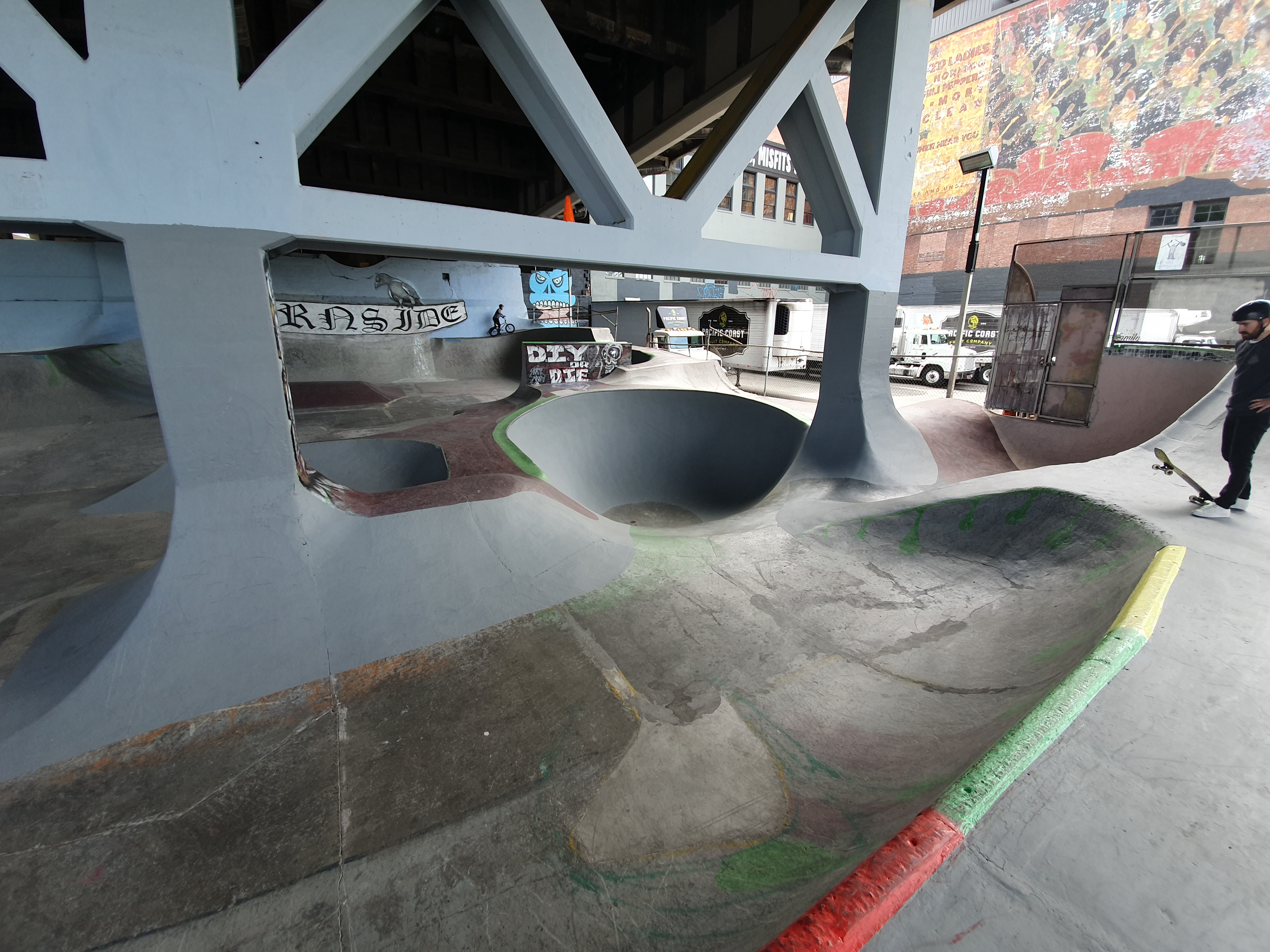
The Burnside Skatepark as of May 18, 2019. Taken from the west wall of the skatepark.

The DIY project was begun by skateboarders Halloween night of 1990 by pouring concrete against Burnside's main wall, creating a vertical transition obstacle in the empty parking lot below the east-end of the Burnside bridge. The skateboarders found inspiration to do so because the area was covered and protected from Portland's rainy season, allowing the park's riders to skate all year long. With a spare couple of bags of cement, the project was begun. The founders created a bank obstacle three feet by three feet in dimensions. The second obstacle created was another bank against the same wall, this time with the dimensions of five by six feet. The banks were eventually merged into a single bank. The second major obstacle built was a mini bowl pocket along the north-end support beam of the bridge. Following these initial small obstacles, the founders of the DIY project struck a deal with nearby construction workers, employed by Ross Island Cement, building the I-84 on-ramp. The skateboarders convinced the workers to give them leftover cement from the I-84 on-ramp construction. From then on, the project's construction exploded, with the skaters re-paving the ground of the parking lot.

Prior to the beginning of the skatepark project, the spot was overrun with illegal activity.

In 2016, an apartment complex known as Yard was constructed west of the Burnside skatepark. There was a lot of speculation on what would happen to the park, with supporters of the skatepark creating petitions to preserve the skatepark. Ultimately, the skatepark did not experience any loss of territory, just a loss of sunlight from the building blockage. The construction of the apartment complex obstructed sunlight from the skatepark, causing Burnside to be much darker during the day. To compensate for this, Yard's chief developer agreed to install lights for the skatepark.

== Influence ==
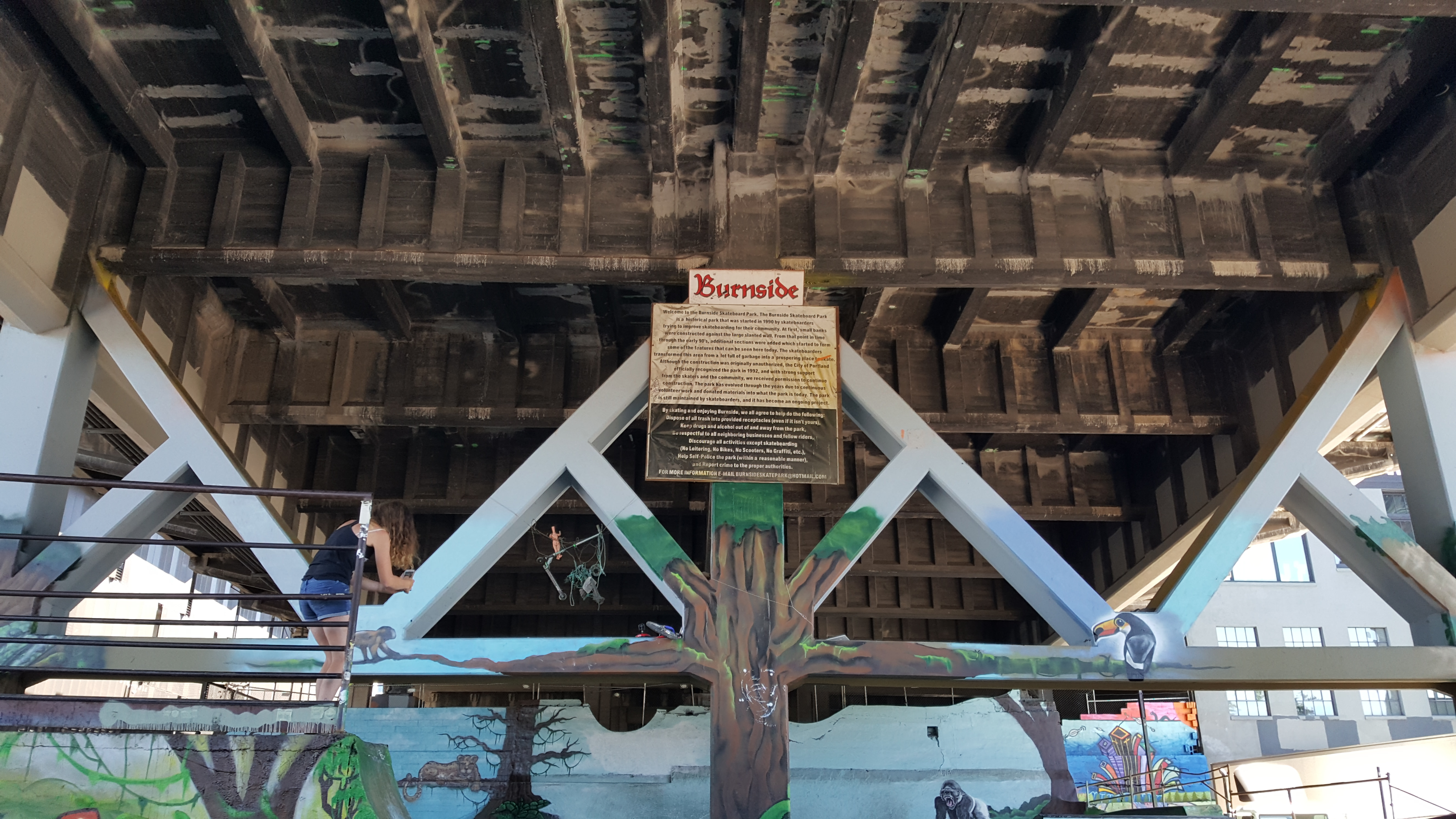
Signage above the skatepark, 2020

Burnside is credited with the start of the DIY movement in the skateboarding industry. Its foundation lead to two of the largest skatepark-construction companies, Grindline Skateparks and Dreamland Skateparks, both of which have gone to build hundreds of additional skateparks across America.

In a 2009 article the Wall Street Journal attributes Burnside as being instrumental in transforming Portland into "the skateboarding capital of the world" and the site serves as a memorable landmark on the "Portland Walking Tour."

== See also ==
- List of skateparks
- Skateboarding in Portland, Oregon
