= Jim Murphy (skateboarder) =

American skateboarder (born 1965)

Personal information
- Full name: James Murphy
- Occupation(s): Skateboarder, community activist, skate entrepreneur
- Website: www.woundedkneeskateboards.net

Sport
- Sport: Skateboarding

James Murphy (born October 11, 1965) is an American skateboarder, writer, artist, skateboard company owner, and skateboarding activist.

== Early life ==
Murphy is of Lenni-Lenape and Irish descent. Murphy started skateboarding in 1976.

== Professional skateboarding career ==
In the 1980s, Murphy turned pro the day after graduating from Rutger's University in New Brunswick, NJ, home to Tom Groholski's ramp. Murphy later toured with the Alva skateboard company.

== Stronghold Society ==
Murphy and Walt Pourier co-founded the Stronghold Society. Murphy is the skate parks director for the Stronghold Society.

=== Wounded Knee Four Directions Skatepark Program ===
Murphy and Pourier developed the Wounded Knee Four Directions Skatepark Program dedicated to creating and sustaining skateparks in Native American communities. The program operates out of the 501(c) organization Stronghold Society.

==== Wounded Knee 4-Directions Toby Eagle Bull Memorial Skatepark ====
Murphy and Wounded Knee Skateboards, with Pourier and the Stronghold Society, lead a successful skatepark campaign for the Wounded Knee 4-Directions Skatepark on the Pine Ridge reservation in South Dakota. The park opened in Pine Ridge Village in 2011.

== Wounded Knee Skateboard Manufacturing and Propaganda ==
Murphy and Andy Kessler started the Wounded Knee Skateboard Manufacturing and Propaganda company in 1998. Murphy and Kessler decided to use the Wounded Knee name to spread awareness about Native American history and the Wounded Knee Massacre. Additionally, Murphy and Kessler envisioned that the company would one day give back to the Lakota people, the tribe massacred at Wounded Knee, by building skateboard parks for their youth.

== Nibwaakaawin (Wisdom) ==
Murphy partnered with Todd Harder in founding Nibwaakaawin (Wisdom), a Native American nonprofit whose mission is to "foster creativity, build courage, enable cultural identity and pride, and promote nonviolent and healthy physical activity through skateboarding."
