= Walt Pourier =

Native-American skateboarding activist and artist

Walt Pourier is an American skateboarder, artist, designer, and skateboarding activist. Pourier is Oglala Lakota.

== Early life ==
Pourier started skating growing up on Pine Ridge. As a child, he moved with his mother to Orange County, California for a period of time. In California, Pourier began hopping fences and skating pools. Pourier returned to Pine Ridge, where he worked as an artist, eventually starting his own business, Nakota Designs.

== Art career ==
Pourier is an artist who paints and designs on skateboards, canvas, and other materials. He was Artist in Residence at the Denver Art Museum in 2017.

== Stronghold Society ==
Pourier and Jim Murphy co-founded the Stronghold Society. Walt Pourier is the executive director for the Stronghold Society.

=== Wounded Knee Four Directions Skatepark Program ===
Murphy and Pourier developed the Wounded Knee Four Directions Skatepark Program dedicated to creating and sustaining skateparks in Native American communities. The program operates out of the 501(c) organization Stronghold Society.

==== Wounded Knee 4-Directions Toby Eagle Bull Memorial Skatepark ====
Murphy and Wounded Knee Skateboards, with Pourier and the Stronghold Society; as well as, Jeff Ament, lead a successful skatepark campaign for the Wounded Knee 4-Directions Skatepark on the Pine Ridge reservation in South Dakota. The park opened in Pine Ridge Village in 2011.

=== Live Life Call To Action Campaigns ===
Stronghold Society runs campaigns aimed at tribal youth, aiming to instill hope and support native youth movements. Pourier describes the work of the Stronghold Society and these Call to Action Campaigns as a subliminal mental health effort.

=== Recognition ===
Pourier received the 2014 Governor's Creative Leadership Award from the State of Colorado for his work with the Stronghold Society.

== Nakota Designs ==
Pourier is the founder and creative director of Nakota Designs, a graphic design and branding consultancy based out of Colorado. Nakota Designs works with a range of clients including the Tribal College Journal.
