= Creston Park =

Public park in Portland, Oregon, U.S.

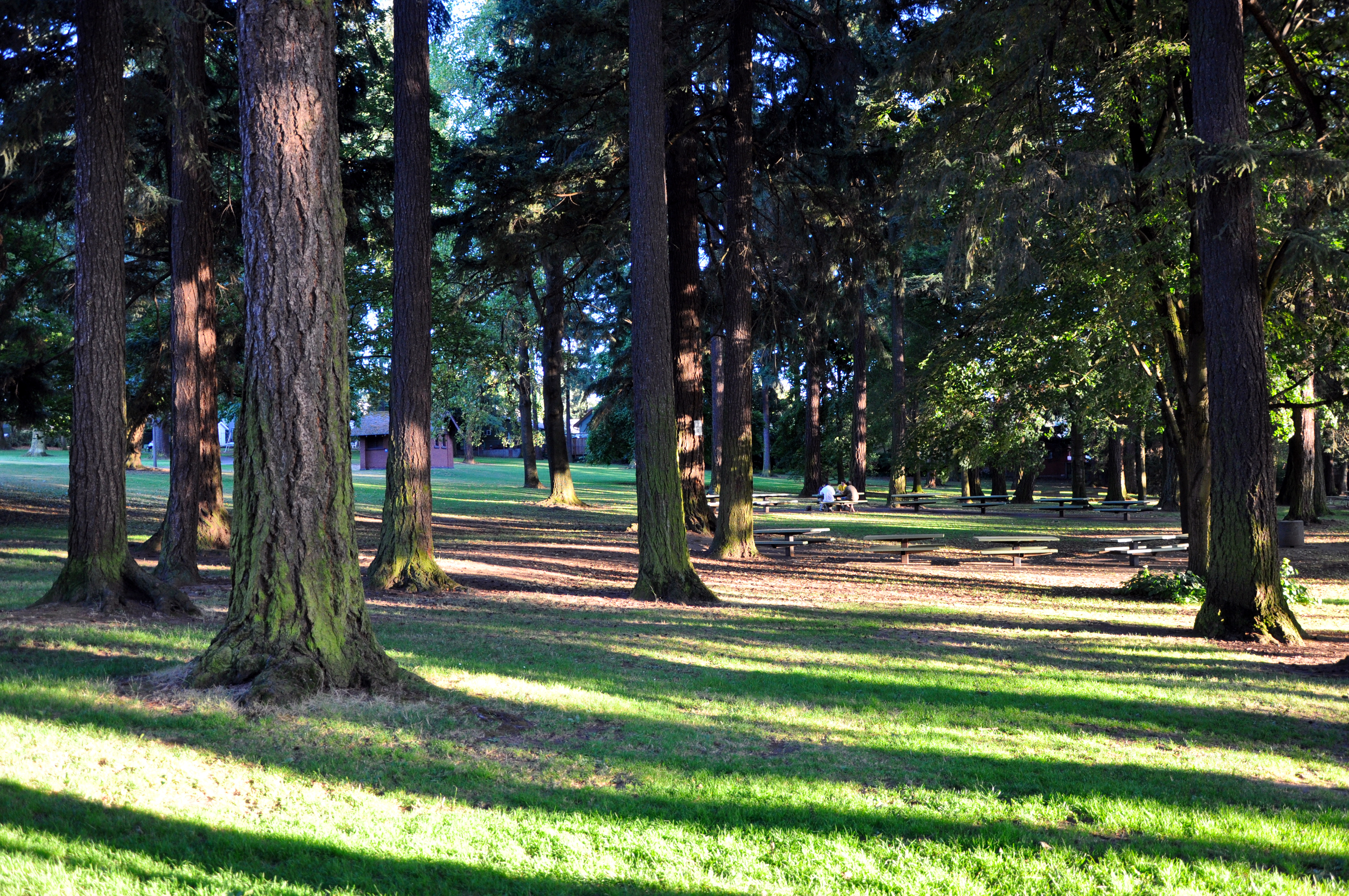
- The park in 2010

- Location within Portland, Oregon
- Location: SE 44th Ave. and Powell Blvd. Portland, Oregon
- Coordinates: 45°29′47″N 122°37′0″W
- Area: 14.38 acres (5.82 ha)
- Operator: Portland Parks & Recreation

Creston Park is a 14.38-acre (5.82 ha) public park in southeast Portland, Oregon's Creston-Kenilworth neighborhood, in the United States. The space was acquired in 1920.
