= Gateway Discovery Park =

Public park in Portland, Oregon, U.S.

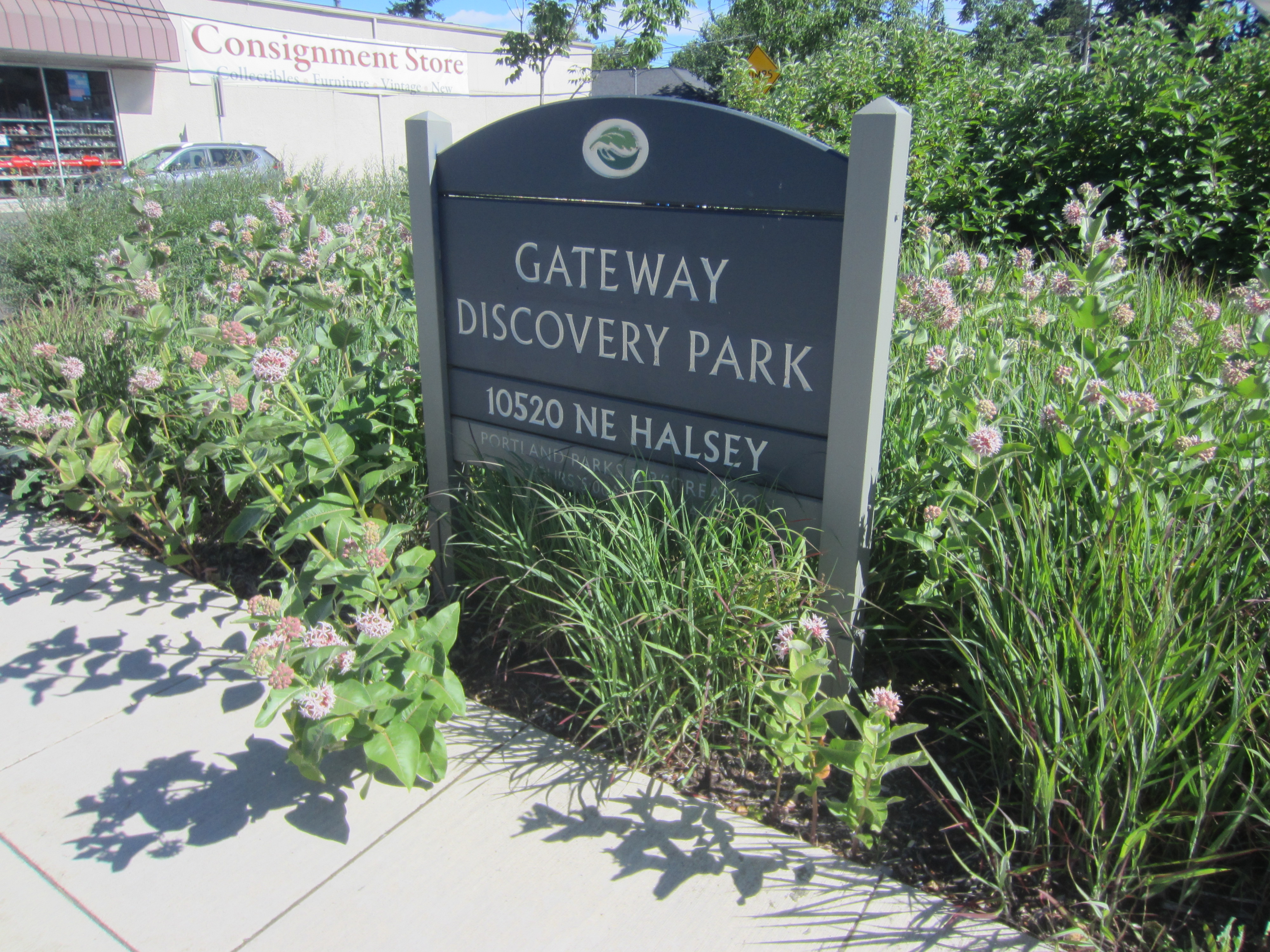
- Park sign, 2022
- Interactive map of Gateway Discovery Park
- Location: Portland, Oregon, U.S.
- Coordinates: 45°31′57″N 122°33′16″W

Gateway Discovery Park is a 3.01-acre (1.22 ha) public park in northeast Portland, Oregon. The park was acquired in 2009, and opened in 2018.
