= Parelius =

Parelius is a given name and surname. Notable people with the name include:

- Parelius Hjalmar Bang Berntsen (1910–1995), Norwegian politician
- Parelius Finnerud, Norwegian long-distance runner
- Parelius Mentsen, Norwegian trade unionist
- Carl Peter Parelius Essendrop (1818–1893), Norwegian politician, clergyman, and educator
- Sofie Parelius, Norwegian actress

== Other ==
- Martin Parelius Fourplex, Historic building in Portland, Oregon, U.S.
