= Herman Vetter House =

Historic building in Portland, Oregon, U.S.

- U.S. National Register of Historic Places
- Portland Historic Landmark
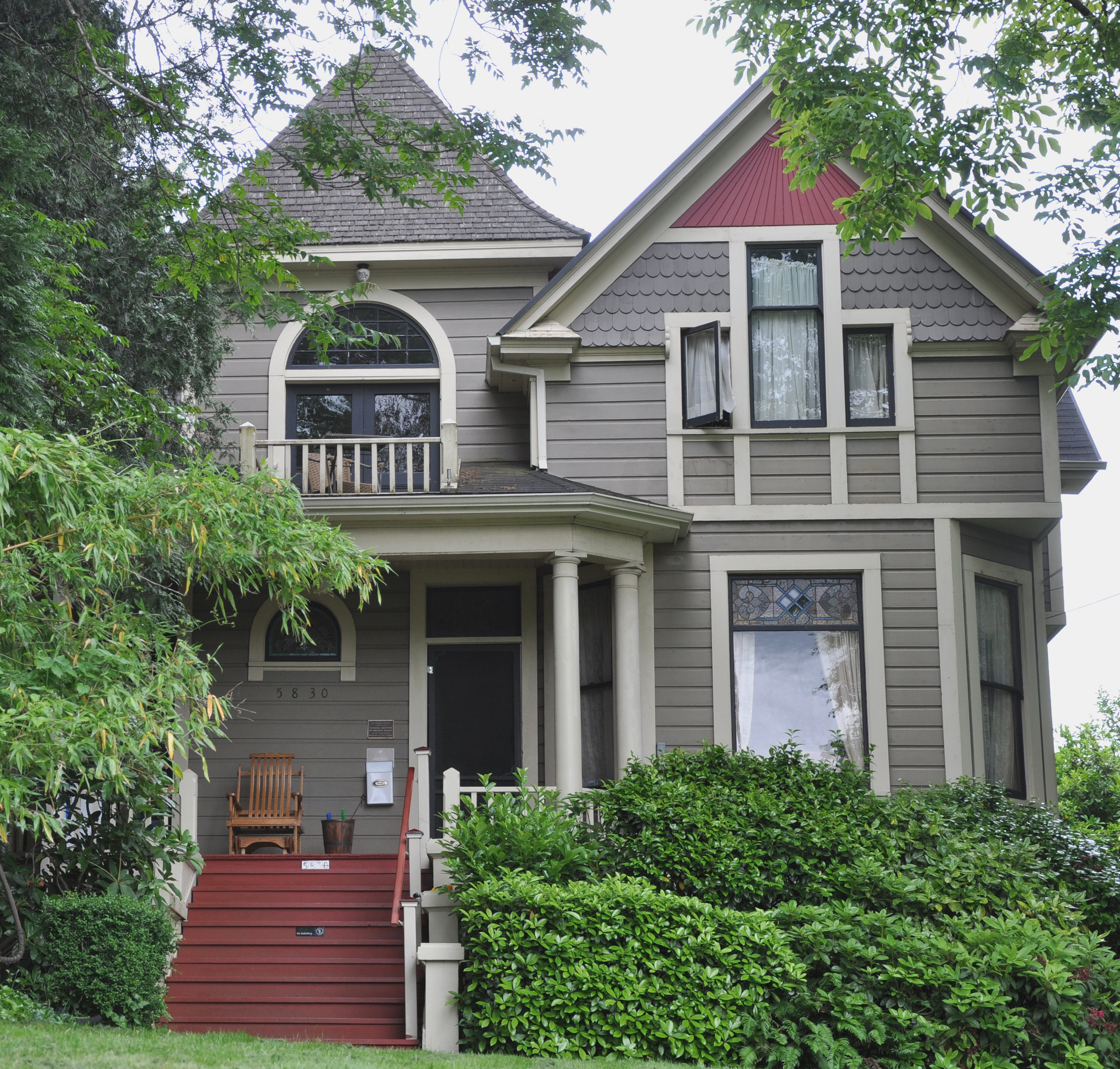
- The Vetter House in 2011

- Location within Portland, Oregon
- Location: 5830 SE Taylor Street; Portland, Oregon
- Coordinates: 45°30′52″N 122°36′12″W
- Area: 0.4 acres (0.16 ha)
- Built: 1890
- Architectural style: Queen Anne, Vernacular Queen Anne
- NRHP reference No.: 92000660
- Added to NRHP: June 4, 1992

The Herman Vetter House is a house in southeast Portland, Oregon listed on the National Register of Historic Places.

== See also ==
- National Register of Historic Places listings in Southeast Portland, Oregon
