= Clarence H. Jones House =

Historic building in Portland, Oregon, U.S.

- U.S. National Register of Historic Places
- Portland Historic Landmark
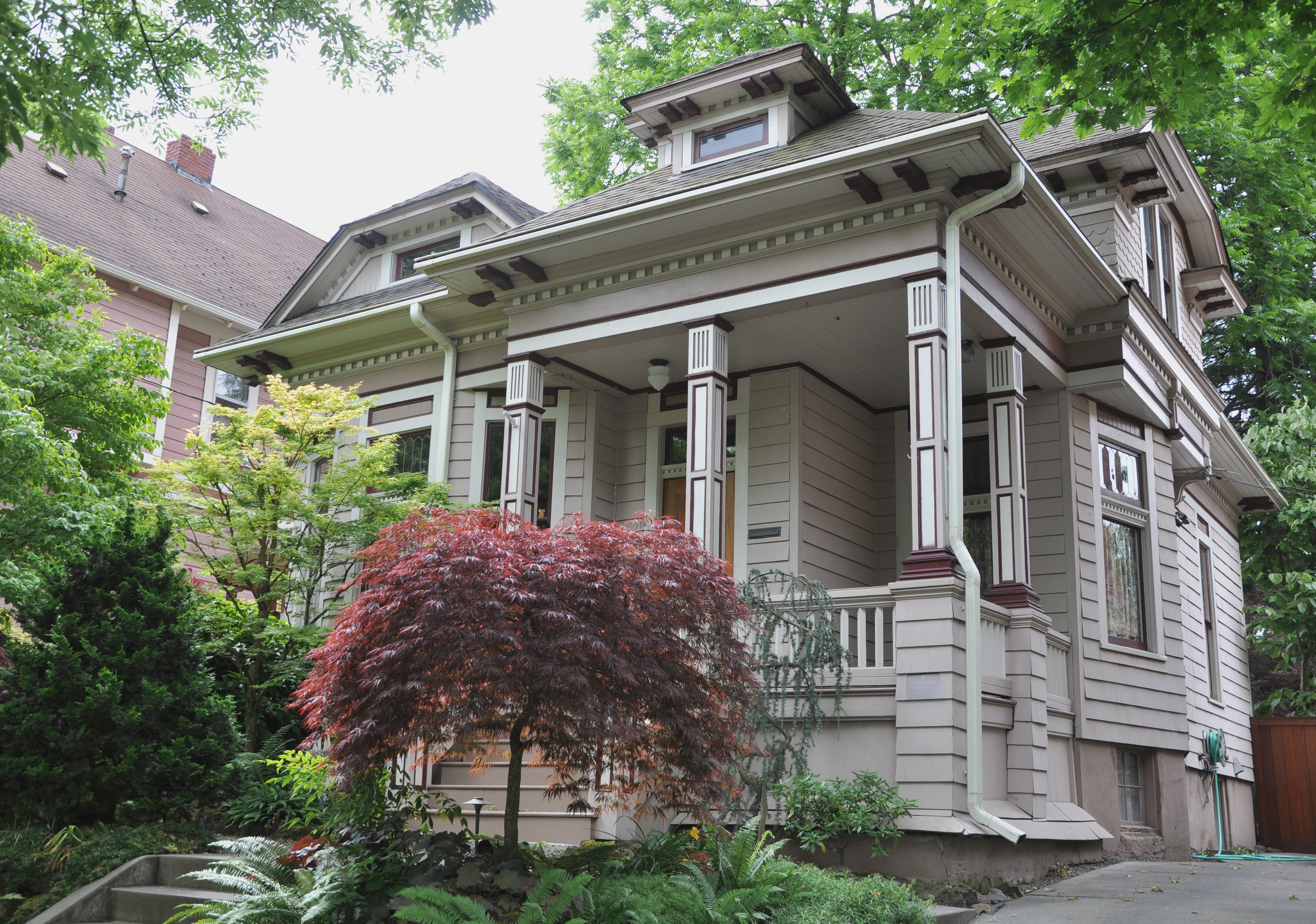
- Clarence H. Jones House in 2011
- Location: 1834 SE Ankeny Street; Portland, Oregon
- Coordinates: 45°31′19″N 122°38′48″W
- Built: 1901
- Architect: Richard L. Zeller
- Architectural style: Queen Anne
- MPS: Portland Eastside MPS
- NRHP reference No.: 89000085
- Added to NRHP: March 8, 1989

The Clarence H. Jones House is a house located in southeast Portland, Oregon listed on the National Register of Historic Places.

== See also ==
- National Register of Historic Places listings in Southeast Portland, Oregon
