= Edward D. Dupont House =

Historic building in Portland, Oregon, U.S.

- U.S. National Register of Historic Places
- Portland Historic Landmark
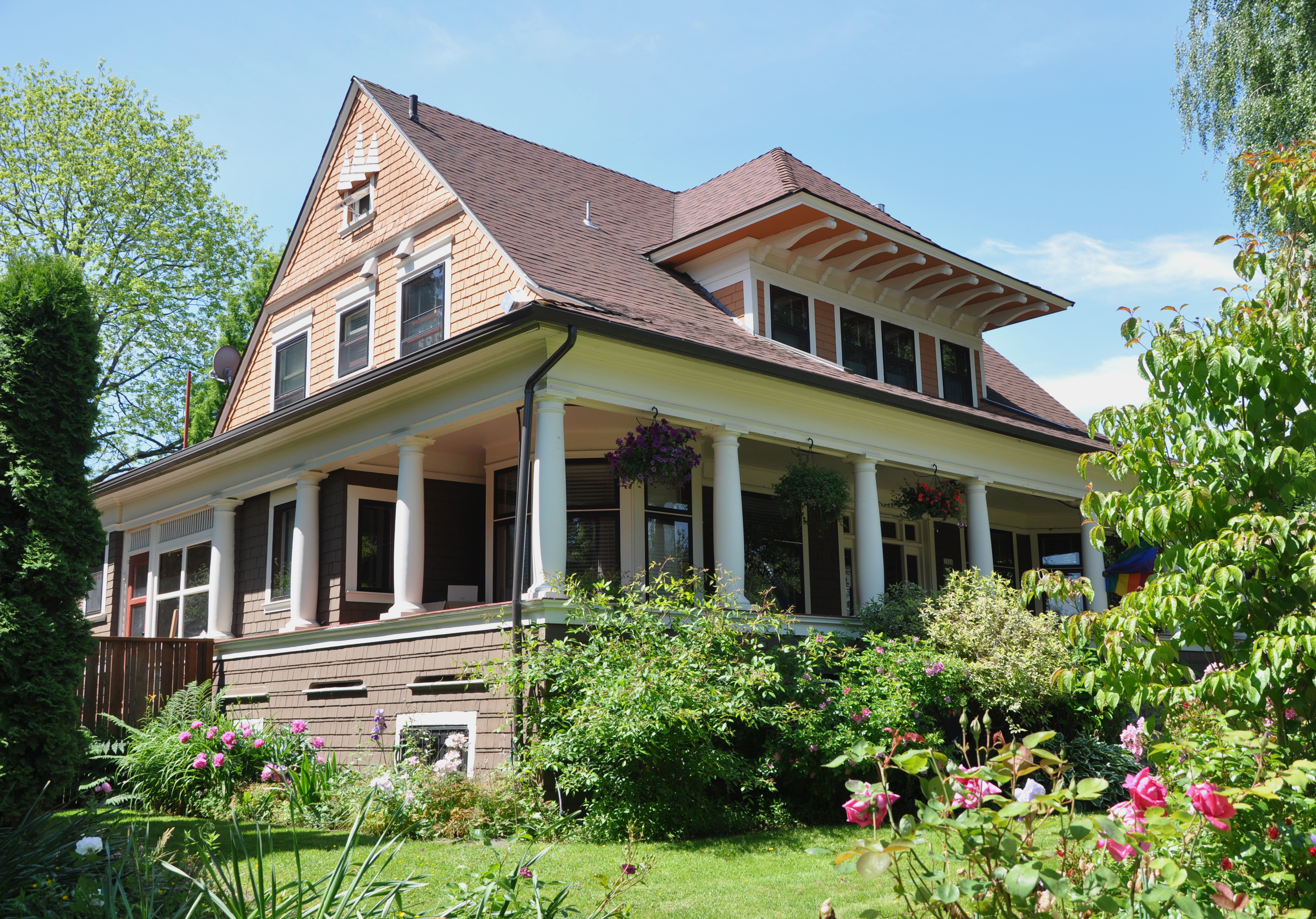
- Edward D. Dupont House in 2011

- Location within Portland, Oregon
- Location: 3326 SE Main Street; Portland, Oregon
- Coordinates: 45°30′48″N 122°37′49″W
- Built: 1905
- Architectural style: Bungalow/Craftsman, Shingle Style
- MPS: Portland Eastside MPS
- NRHP reference No.: 89000095
- Added to NRHP: March 8, 1989

The Edward D. Dupont House is a house in southeast Portland, Oregon listed on the National Register of Historic Places.

== See also ==
- National Register of Historic Places listings in Southeast Portland, Oregon
