= Postal Employees Credit Union =

Historic building in Portland, Oregon, U.S.

Coordinates: 45.5196°N 122.6560°W

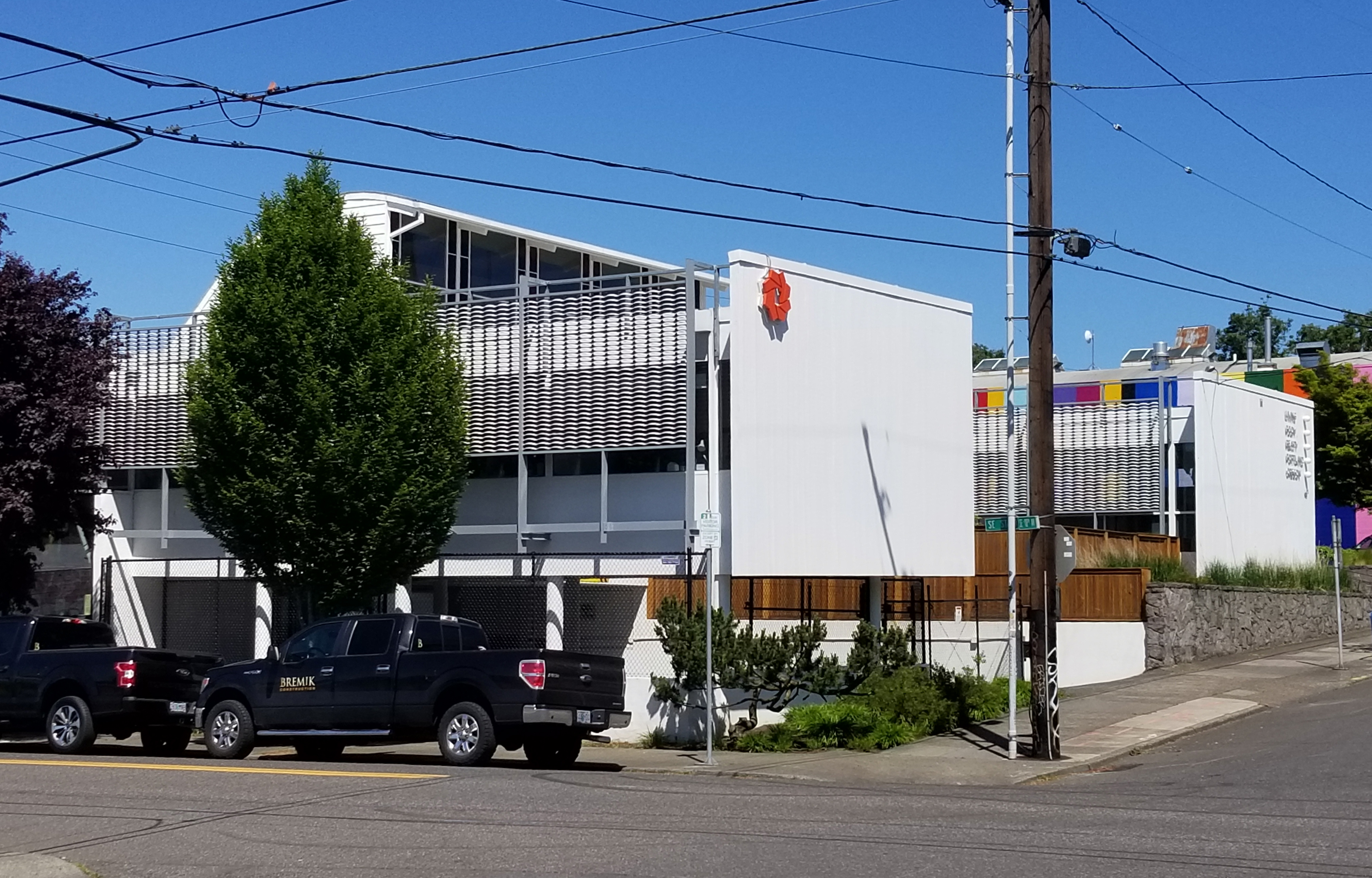
The building's exterior in 2021

The Postal Employees Credit Union is a historic building in Portland, Oregon. Located in southeast Portland's Buckman neighborhood, it is listed on the National Register of Historic Places.

== See also ==
- National Register of Historic Places listings in Southeast Portland, Oregon
