= National Register of Historic Places listings in Southeast Portland, Oregon =

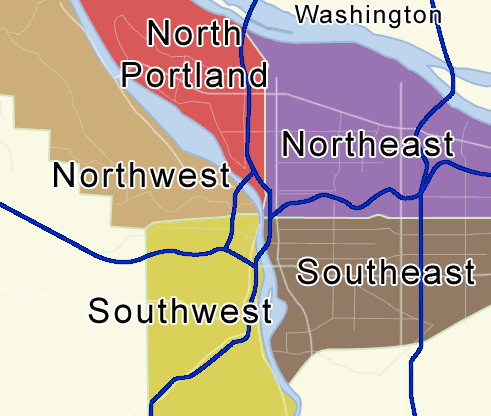
Locator map showing five of Portland's six quadrants. Click a quadrant to go to its National Register list. (South Portland listings are included on the Southwest Portland list.)

This list presents the full set of buildings, structures, objects, sites, or districts designated on the National Register of Historic Places in Southeast Portland, Oregon, United States, and offers brief descriptive information about each of them. The National Register recognizes places of national, state, or local historic significance across the United States. Out of over 90,000 National Register sites nationwide, Oregon is home to over 2,000, and over one-fourth of those are found partially or wholly in Portland. While these sites are widely spread across all six of Portland's quadrants, heavy concentrations are found in the Downtown and Southwest Hills neighborhoods of the Southwest quadrant, and the Northwest District neighborhood of the Northwest quadrant.

Only historic places within the municipal boundaries of Portland are shown in this list and its four companion lists for the other quadrants. Some sites beyond city limits will appear in other lists showing "Portland" as a general locality, but are excluded here. Although Portland's legal boundaries extend into Clackamas and Washington counties, all of the city's National Register sites lie within Multnomah County.

This National Park Service list is complete through NPS recent listings posted June 26, 2026.

== Current listings ==
	Name on the Register	Image	Date listed	Location	Description
1	H. Russell Albee House	H. Russell Albee House	October 22, 1992 (#92001332)	3360 SE Ankeny Street; 45°31′19″N 122°37′43″W	H. Russell Albee (1867–1950) was Mayor of Portland (1913–1917) during its complex transition to a new form of commission-based government. A. E. Doyle (1877–1928) designed this 1912 house for him, and it remains one of the finest and best-preserved Colonial Revival houses in Doyle's body of work. Albee lived here for the duration of his mayoral administration and until 1918.
2	Arleta Branch Library	Arleta Branch Library	March 15, 2016 (#16000088)	4420 SE 64th Avenue; 45°29′26″N 122°35′50″W	
3	Auto Freight Transport Building of Oregon and Washington	Auto Freight Transport Building of Oregon and Washington	June 30, 2005 (#05000641)	1001 SE Water Avenue; 45°30′56″N 122°39′58″W	
4	Louis J. Bader House and Garden	Louis J. Bader House and Garden	October 30, 1989 (#89001856)	3604 SE Oak Street; 45°31′12″N 122°37′38″W	
5	Bagdad Theatre	Bagdad Theatre	March 8, 1989 (#89000099)	3702–3726 SE Hawthorne Boulevard; 45°30′42″N 122°37′31″W	
6	Barber Block	Barber Block	February 15, 1977 (#77001109)	532–538 SE Grand Avenue; 45°31′08″N 122°39′37″W	
7	Gustave Bartman House	Gustave Bartman House	March 8, 1989 (#89000098)	1817 SE 12th Avenue; 45°30′35″N 122°39′14″W	
8	Blake McFall Company Building	Blake McFall Company Building	March 9, 1990 (#90000371)	215 SE Ankeny Street; 45°31′21″N 122°39′48″W	
9	Charles O. and Carie C. Blakely House	Charles O. and Carie C. Blakely House	March 6, 2019 (#100003451)	2203 SE Pine Street; 45°31′15″N 122°38′36″W	Portland Eastside MPS
10	USS Blueback (submarine)	USS Blueback (submarine)	September 18, 2008 (#08000947)	Moored on the east bank of the Willamette River, at 1495 SE Water Avenue; 45°30′28″N 122°40′01″W	This Barbel-class diesel-electric submarine, launched in 1959, was the last non-nuclear submarine to join the U.S. Navy and the last to be decommissioned. The Barbels' teardrop-shaped hulls were revolutionary for their time and became the standard for subsequent classes of submarine worldwide. Beginning in 1994, Blueback was converted into a museum ship.
11	William E. Brainard House	William E. Brainard House	March 1, 1979 (#79002128)	5332 SE Morrison Street; 45°31′02″N 122°36′29″W	This 1888 Italianate structure is one of the few stately homes remaining from the late-19th century period when Mount Tabor was one of Portland's most prestigious neighborhoods. It was occupied by a series of residents prominent in business, including farmer, real estate investor, and banker William E. Brainard; stock broker and investment banker George W. Davis; and dentist and dental supplier John C. Welch.
12	Buckler–Henry House	Buckler–Henry House	February 12, 1980 (#80003358)	2324 SE Ivon Street; 45°30′14″N 122°38′31″W	Built in 1891 by John Buckler for Charles K. Henry, who platted the neighborhood in 1890, this house is one of Portland's few remaining examples of 19th century brick residential construction. Prominent later residents included Grace Olivier Peck, who served in the Oregon House of Representatives for 22 years between 1948 and 1977.
13	Philip Buehner House	Philip Buehner House	October 24, 1980 (#80003359)	5511 SE Hawthorne Boulevard; 45°30′44″N 122°36′23″W	
14	Burnside Bridge	Burnside Bridge	November 14, 2012 (#12000931)	Spanning the Willamette River at river mile 12.7; 45°31′23″N 122°40′03″W	Opened in 1926 as a centerpiece of Portland's transportation system, the Burnside Bridge was embroiled in a public corruption scandal during its development. Part of a three-bridge package funded by a public bond issue, it was one of the final works in bridge engineer Gustav Lindenthal's impressive career. (Note: The three bridges in the bond-funded package were the Burnside Bridge, Ross Island Bridge, and Sellwood Bridge (which has since been demolished and replaced). Lindenthal was the supervising engineer for the construction of all three bridges. He was responsible for the design of the Ross Island and Sellwood bridges, but for the Burnside Bridge he adapted a design by Ira G. Hedrick and Robert E. Kremers. Hedrick and Kremers were removed from the project due to the corruption scandal.) It is one of the country's heaviest bascule bridges, and the earliest to use a concrete deck on the lift span.
15	Burrell Heights Apartments	Burrell Heights Apartments	February 21, 1997 (#97000120)	2903–2919 SE Clay Street; 45°30′41″N 122°38′09″W	
16	Walter F. Burrell House	Walter F. Burrell House	October 25, 1990 (#90001593)	2610 SE Hawthorne Boulevard; 45°30′42″N 122°38′19″W	
17	Samuel Cobb House	Samuel Cobb House	May 20, 1999 (#99000607)	1314 SE 55th Avenue; 45°30′48″N 122°36′23″W	
18	Jacob H. and Etna M. Cook House	Jacob H. and Etna M. Cook House	February 5, 2021 (#100006123)	5631 SE Belmont Street; 45°31′01″N 122°36′19″W	
19	John Deere Plow Company Building	John Deere Plow Company Building	March 8, 1989 (#89000097)	215 SE Morrison Street; 45°31′03″N 122°39′48″W	
20	Douglas Building	Douglas Building	March 8, 1989 (#89000096)	3525–3541 SE Hawthorne Boulevard; 45°30′44″N 122°37′41″W	
21	Edward D. Dupont House	Edward D. Dupont House	March 8, 1989 (#89000095)	3326 SE Main Street; 45°30′48″N 122°37′49″W	
22	Eastmoreland Historic District	Eastmoreland Historic District	December 7, 2022 (#100008367)	Generally bounded by SE Woodstock Blvd., Eastmoreland Golf Course, Johnson Cr., and SE Crystal Springs Blvd. 45°28′13″N 122°38′08″W	
23	East Portland Branch, Public Library of Multnomah County	East Portland Branch, Public Library of Multnomah County	September 8, 1987 (#87001491)	1110 SE Alder Street; 45°31′04″N 122°39′15″W	This 1911 library, designed by Portland architect A.E. Doyle and built with funding from the Carnegie Foundation, became one of the earliest public library branches outside downtown Portland. It has since been converted to an office building.
24	East Portland Grand Avenue Historic District	East Portland Grand Avenue Historic District	March 4, 1991 (#91000126)	Along SE Grand Avenue within the rectangle bounded by SE Martin Luther King Jr. Boulevard, SE Ankeny Street, SE 7th Avenue, and SE Main Street. 45°31′04″N 122°39′39″W	
25	Enterprise Planing Mill	Enterprise Planing Mill	March 2, 2006 (#06000097)	50 SE Yamhill Street; 45°30′56″N 122°39′56″W	
26	Eugenia Apartments	Eugenia Apartments	March 8, 1989 (#89000094)	1314 SE Salmon Street; 45°30′51″N 122°39′08″W	
27	Franklin W. Farrer House	Franklin W. Farrer House	March 8, 1989 (#89000093)	2706 SE Yamhill Street; 45°30′56″N 122°38′17″W	
28	William D. Fenton House	William D. Fenton House	August 29, 1979 (#79002145)	626 SE 16th Avenue; 45°31′05″N 122°38′57″W	
29	Thaddeus Fisher House	Thaddeus Fisher House	March 8, 1989 (#89000092)	913–915 SE 33rd Avenue; 45°30′58″N 122°37′53″W	
30	Frances Building and Echo Theater	Frances Building and Echo Theater	January 28, 1994 (#93001566)	3628–3646 SE Hawthorne Boulevard; 45°30′42″N 122°37′34″W	
31	Frigidaire Building	Frigidaire Building	March 8, 1989 (#89000091)	230 E Burnside Street; 45°31′22″N 122°39′47″W	
32	Gatehouse, Portland City Reservoir No. 2	Gatehouse, Portland City Reservoir No. 2	June 1, 1990 (#90000834)	6007 SE Division Street; 45°30′20″N 122°36′05″W	
33	Genoa Building	Genoa Building	June 13, 1997 (#97000580)	2832 SE Belmont Street; 45°30′59″N 122°38′11″W	
34	Elizabeth B. Gowanlock House	Elizabeth B. Gowanlock House	March 8, 1989 (#89000089)	808 SE 28th Avenue; 45°31′01″N 122°38′13″W	
35	Thomas Graham Building	Thomas Graham Building	March 5, 1992 (#92000134)	6031 SE Stark Street; 45°31′10″N 122°36′06″W	
36	Grand Central Public Market	Grand Central Public Market	November 15, 2006 (#06001034)	808 SE Morrison Street; 45°31′01″N 122°39′26″W	
37	Harry A. and Ada Green House	Harry A. and Ada Green House	September 30, 2013 (#13000805)	3316 SE Ankeny Street; 45°31′18″N 122°37′45″W	
38	Hawthorne Bridge	Hawthorne Bridge	November 14, 2012 (#12000932)	Spanning the Willamette River at river mile 13.1; 45°30′48″N 122°40′15″W	Part of the Willamette River Highway Bridges of Portland, Oregon MPS
39	Rachel Louise Hawthorne House	Rachel Louise Hawthorne House	March 8, 1989 (#89000090)	1007 SE 12th Avenue; 45°30′56″N 122°39′14″W	
40	Herschell–Spillman Noah's Ark Carousel	Herschell–Spillman Noah's Ark Carousel	August 26, 1987 (#87001380)	5 SE Spokane Street; 45°28′22″N 122°39′44″W	
41	James Hickey House	James Hickey House	October 17, 1990 (#90001514)	6719 SE 29th Avenue; 45°28′28″N 122°38′01″W	
42	William B. Holden House	William B. Holden House	May 20, 1999 (#99000605)	6347 SE Yamhill Street; 45°30′54″N 122°35′57″W	Boundary decrease November 4, 2016.
43	International Harvester Company Warehouse	International Harvester Company Warehouse	March 8, 1989 (#89000088)	79 SE Taylor Street; 45°30′55″N 122°39′54″W	
44	Italian Gardeners and Ranchers Association Market Building	Italian Gardeners and Ranchers Association Market Building	March 8, 1989 (#89000087)	1305–1337 SE Martin Luther King Jr. Boulevard; 45°30′48″N 122°39′44″W	
45	Jacobs–Wilson House	Jacobs–Wilson House	December 10, 1981 (#81000516)	6461 SE Thorburn Street; 45°31′15″N 122°35′51″W	
46	Jones Cash Store	Jones Cash Store	October 4, 2005 (#05001148)	111 SE Belmont Street; 45°31′01″N 122°39′52″W	
47	Clarence H. Jones House	Clarence H. Jones House	March 8, 1989 (#89000085)	1834 SE Ankeny Street; 45°31′19″N 122°38′48″W	
48	Juniper House	Juniper House	February 10, 2025 (#100011448)	2006 SE Ankeny Street; 45°31′20″N 122°38′43″W	
49	Joseph Kendall House	Joseph Kendall House	August 29, 1979 (#79002134)	3908–3916 SE Taggart Street; 45°30′09″N 122°37′20″W	
50	F. M. Knight Building	F. M. Knight Building	March 8, 1989 (#89000086)	3300 SE Belmont Street; 45°30′59″N 122°37′51″W	
51	Nettie Krouse Fourplex	Nettie Krouse Fourplex	March 8, 1989 (#89000084)	2106–2112 SE Main Street; 45°30′48″N 122°38′39″W	
52	Henry Kuehle Investment Property	Henry Kuehle Investment Property	March 8, 1989 (#89000083)	201–213 SE 12th Avenue; 45°31′17″N 122°39′14″W	
53	Ladd's Addition Historic District	Ladd's Addition Historic District	August 31, 1988 (#88001310)	Bounded by SE Division Street, SE Hawthorne Boulevard, ane SE 12th and 20th Avenues; 45°30′31″N 122°38′58″W	
54	Laurelhurst Historic District	Laurelhurst Historic District	March 18, 2019 (#100003462)	Roughly bounded by SE Stark Street, NE Senate Street, and 32nd and 44th Avenues (See also Northeast Portland.); 45°31′18″N 122°37′23″W	Built starting in 1910, this is an exceptional case of a streetcar suburb planned, developed, and marketed by a single entity. Its winding streets combined with radial thoroughfares make an unusually full expression of the ideals of the City Beautiful movement. The c. 1700 houses in the district illustrate the popular trends in domestic architecture through the 1940s. Aimed at the middle and upper class market for single-family homes, Laurelhurst's exclusionary rules were accentuated by zoning codes and racially restrictive deed covenants.
55	Laurelhurst Manor Apartments	Laurelhurst Manor Apartments	October 3, 1996 (#96001069)	3100 SE Ankeny Street; 45°31′19″N 122°37′58″W	
56	Laurelhurst Park	Laurelhurst Park	February 16, 2001 (#01000134)	3554 SE Ankeny Street; 45°31′17″N 122°37′35″W	
57	George P. Lent Investment Properties	George P. Lent Investment Properties	March 8, 1989 (#89000082)	1921–1927 SE 7th Avenue and 621–637 SE Harrison Street; 45°30′32″N 122°39′33″W	
58	Lone Fir Cemetery	Lone Fir Cemetery	August 16, 2007 (#07000824)	2115 SE Morrison Street; 45°31′05″N 122°38′32″W	Pioneer cemetery formally established in 1855, the oldest interment dating to 1846. It provides the final resting place of a broad cross-section of Portland society, from many of its most prominent citizens to over 1,100 early Chinese American immigrants.
59	Claude Hayes Miller House	Claude Hayes Miller House	May 20, 1999 (#99000606)	13051 SE Claybourne Street; 45°28′30″N 122°31′43″W	
60	Mizpah Presbyterian Church of East Portland	Mizpah Presbyterian Church of East Portland	May 19, 1983 (#83002174)	2456–2462 SE Tamarack Avenue; 45°30′19″N 122°38′48″W	
61	Wilhelmina Mohle House	Wilhelmina Mohle House	March 8, 1989 (#89000081)	734 SE 34th Avenue; 45°31′02″N 122°37′45″W	
62	Monastery of the Precious Blood	Monastery of the Precious Blood	February 14, 1985 (#85000294)	1208 SE 76th Avenue; 45°30′51″N 122°35′05″W	
63	Morrison Bridge	Morrison Bridge	November 14, 2012 (#12000933)	Spanning the Willamette River at river mile 12.8; 45°31′04″N 122°40′11″W	Part of the Willamette River Highway Bridges of Portland, Oregon MPS
64	Mount Tabor Park	Mount Tabor Park	September 22, 2004 (#04001065)	Roughly bounded by SE Division Street, SE 60th Avenue, SE Yamhill Street, and SE Mountainview Drive; 45°30′43″N 122°35′39″W	
65	Mount Tabor Park Reservoirs Historic District	Mount Tabor Park Reservoirs Historic District	January 15, 2004 (#03001446)	1900 SE Reservoir Loop; 45°30′40″N 122°35′47″W	
66	William O. Munsell House	William O. Munsell House	March 8, 1989 (#89000080)	1507 SE Alder Street; 45°31′05″N 122°39′01″W	
67	Paul C. Murphy House	Paul C. Murphy House	February 28, 1991 (#91000145)	3574 E Burnside Street; 45°31′22″N 122°37′33″W	
68	Otto W. and Ida L. Nelson House	Otto W. and Ida L. Nelson House	August 2, 2001 (#01000831)	203 SE 15th Avenue; 45°31′17″N 122°39′03″W	
69	New Logus Block	New Logus Block	February 1, 1980 (#80003371)	523–535 SE Grand Avenue; 45°31′08″N 122°39′40″W	
70	Olympic Cereal Mill	Olympic Cereal Mill	March 8, 1989 (#89000115)	107 SE Washington Street; 45°31′09″N 122°39′51″W	
71	Oregon Portland Cement Building	Oregon Portland Cement Building	March 8, 1989 (#89000114)	111 SE Madison Street; 45°30′47″N 122°39′52″W	
72	Oriental Apartments	Oriental Apartments	October 15, 1992 (#92001377)	3562 SE Harrison Street; 45°30′31″N 122°37′38″W	
73	Osborn Hotel	Osborn Hotel	March 27, 1980 (#80003373)	203–207 SE Grand Avenue; 45°31′17″N 122°39′40″W	
74	Palestine Lodge	Palestine Lodge	October 4, 2005 (#05001149)	6401 SE Foster Road; 45°29′24″N 122°35′48″W	
75	Pallay Apartments	Pallay Apartments	February 9, 2021 (#100006124)	631 SE Taylor Street; 45°30′54″N 122°39′32″W	
76	Martin Parelius Fourplex	Martin Parelius Fourplex	March 8, 1989 (#89000112)	423–439 SE 28th Avenue; 45°31′10″N 122°38′15″W	
77	Peacock Lane Historic District	Peacock Lane Historic District	October 30, 2017 (#100001774)	Roughly along SE Peacock Lane between SE Stark and Belmont Streets; 45°31′05″N 122°37′18″W	
78	Phoenix Pharmacy	Phoenix Pharmacy	June 21, 2022 (#100007861)	6615 SE Foster Road; 45°29′20″N 122°35′40″W	
79	Charles Piper Building	Charles Piper Building	March 8, 1989 (#89000111)	3610–3624 SE Hawthorne Boulevard; 45°30′43″N 122°37′35″W	
80	James S. Polhemus House	James S. Polhemus House	March 8, 1989 (#89000110)	135 SE 16th Avenue; 45°31′18″N 122°38′59″W	
81	Portland Fire Station No. 7	Portland Fire Station No. 7	May 8, 1989 (#89000109)	1036 SE Stark Street; 45°31′09″N 122°39′18″W	
82	Portland Fire Station No. 23	Portland Fire Station No. 23	May 8, 1989 (#89000108)	1917 SE 7th Avenue; 45°30′33″N 122°39′33″W	
83	Portland Railway, Light and Power Sellwood Division Carbarn Office and Clubhouse	Portland Railway, Light and Power Sellwood Division Carbarn Office and Clubhouse	June 20, 2002 (#02000670)	8825 SE 11th Avenue; 45°27′32″N 122°39′19″W	
84	Portland Sanitarium Nurses' Quarters	Portland Sanitarium Nurses' Quarters	July 3, 2017 (#100001275)	6012 SE Yamhill Street; 45°30′57″N 122°36′06″W	
85	Postal Employees Credit Union	Postal Employees Credit Union	October 26, 2020 (#100005726)	421 SE 10th Avenue; 45°31′10″N 122°39′22″W	
86	Johan Poulsen House	Johan Poulsen House	March 14, 1977 (#77001113)	3040 SE McLoughlin Boulevard; 45°30′04″N 122°39′36″W	
87	Capt. George Raabe House	Capt. George Raabe House	March 8, 1989 (#89000107)	1506–1508 SE Taylor Street; 45°30′54″N 122°39′01″W	
88	Jessie M. Raymond House	Jessie M. Raymond House	March 8, 1989 (#89000106)	2944 SE Taylor Street; 45°30′53″N 122°38′06″W	
89	Jacques and Amelia Reinhart House	Jacques and Amelia Reinhart House	December 2, 1985 (#85003081)	7821 SE 30th Avenue; 45°28′04″N 122°37′58″W	
90	Rex Arms Apartments	Rex Arms Apartments	February 21, 2024 (#100009991)	1230 SE Morrison Street; 45°31′02″N 122°39′10″W	
91	St. John's Episcopal Church	St. John's Episcopal Church	December 27, 1974 (#74001712)	455 SE Spokane Street; 45°27′55″N 122°39′41″W	
92	W. S. Salmon House	W. S. Salmon House	January 21, 1994 (#93001496)	923 SE 13th Avenue; 45°30′58″N 122°39′10″W	
93	San Farlando Apartments	San Farlando Apartments	February 21, 1997 (#97000122)	2903–2925 SE Hawthorne Boulevard; 45°30′44″N 122°38′09″W	
94	Santa Barbara Apartments	Santa Barbara Apartments	March 8, 1989 (#89000105)	2052 SE Hawthorne Boulevard; 45°30′42″N 122°38′40″W	
95	Leslie M. Scott House	Leslie M. Scott House	March 8, 1989 (#89000104)	2936 SE Taylor Street; 45°30′53″N 122°38′07″W	
96	Sellwood Branch YMCA	Sellwood Branch YMCA	November 15, 2006 (#06001033)	1436 SE Spokane Street; 45°27′53″N 122°39′04″W	
97	Henry Sensel Building	Henry Sensel Building	March 8, 1989 (#89000103)	3556–3562 SE Hawthorne Boulevard; 45°30′43″N 122°37′39″W	
98	John and Sarah Sheffield House	John and Sarah Sheffield House	March 1, 1991 (#91000139)	4272 SE Washington Street; 45°31′06″N 122°37′05″W	
99	Charles O. Sigglin Flats	Charles O. Sigglin Flats	March 7, 2019 (#100003453)	701–709 SE 16th Avenue; 45°31′04″N 122°38′59″W	Portland Eastside MPS
100	Blaine Smith House	Blaine Smith House	June 19, 1991 (#91000798)	5219 SE Belmont Street; 45°31′00″N 122°36′33″W	
101	Spokane, Portland and Seattle Railway Steam Locomotive	Spokane, Portland and Seattle Railway Steam Locomotive	January 25, 2006 (#05001557)	Oregon Rail Heritage Center, 2250 SE Water Avenue; 45°30′26″N 122°39′42″W	Unmodified since its manufacture in 1938 and still fully functional, SP&S 700 represents the zenith of steam locomotive technology and practice at the end of the "Age of Steam". By 2006, it was the third-largest and second-most powerful steam locomotive remaining in the world.
102	James B. Stephens House	James B. Stephens House	February 21, 1997 (#97000134)	1825 SE 12th Avenue; 45°30′35″N 122°39′14″W	
103	Troy Laundry Building	Troy Laundry Building	March 8, 1989 (#89000102)	1025 SE Pine Street; 45°31′16″N 122°39′19″W	
104	Herman Vetter House	Herman Vetter House	June 4, 1992 (#92000660)	5830 SE Taylor Street; 45°30′52″N 122°36′12″W	
105	John M. Wallace Fourplex	John M. Wallace Fourplex	May 8, 1989 (#89000101)	3645–3655 SE Yamhill Street; 45°30′57″N 122°37′34″W	
106	Washington High School	Washington High School	November 9, 2015 (#15000779)	1300 SE Stark Street; 45°31′08″N 122°39′08″W	
107	Alfred Webb Investment Properties	Alfred Webb Investment Properties	March 8, 1989 (#89000100)	822 SE 15th Avenue and 1503–1517 SE Belmont Street; 45°31′00″N 122°39′01″W	
108	Wells–Guthrie House	Wells–Guthrie House	February 23, 1990 (#90000278)	6651 SE Scott Drive; 45°31′06″N 122°35′42″W	
109	Nathaniel West Buildings	Nathaniel West Buildings	April 26, 1984 (#84003095)	711–719 SE Grand Avenue; 45°31′03″N 122°39′40″W	
110	West's Block	West's Block	October 10, 1980 (#80003378)	701–707 SE Grand Avenue; 45°31′04″N 122°39′40″W	
111	Willamette National Cemetery	Willamette National Cemetery	July 5, 2016 (#16000426)	11800 SE Mount Scott Boulevard; 45°27′43″N 122°32′26″W	
112	Yale Union Laundry Building	Yale Union Laundry Building	July 19, 2007 (#07000759)	800 SE 10th Avenue; 45°31′01″N 122°39′20″W	

== Former listings ==
	Name on the Register	Image	Date listed	Date removed	Location	Description
1	Portland General Electric Company Station "L" Group	Portland General Electric Company Station "L" Group	December 2, 1985 (#85003090)	December 2, 2020	1841 SE Water Street; 45°30′31″N 122°39′59″W	

== See also ==
- National Register of Historic Places listings in Oregon
- National Register of Historic Places listings in Multnomah County, Oregon
- Listings in neighboring counties: Clackamas, Clark, Columbia, Hood River, Skamania, Washington
- Historic preservation
- History of Portland, Oregon
- Lists of Oregon-related topics
