= William B. Holden House =

Historic building in Portland, Oregon, U.S.

- U.S. National Register of Historic Places
- Portland Historic Landmark
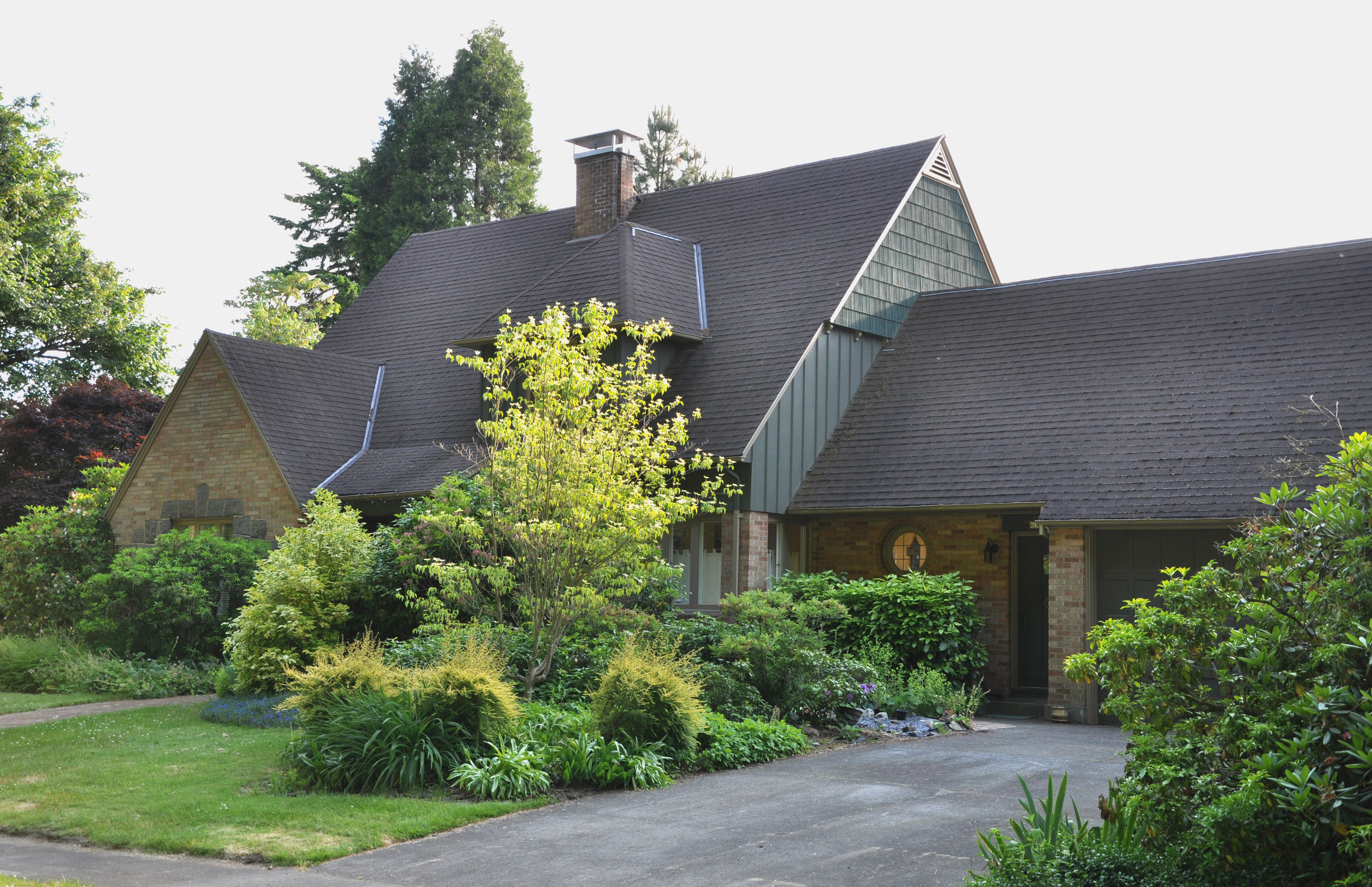
- The house's exterior in 2011
- Location: 6347 SE Yamhill Street; Portland, Oregon
- Coordinates: 45°30′54″N 122°35′57″W
- Area: 0.7 acres (0.28 ha)
- Built: 1929
- Architect: Roscoe Hememway
- Architectural style: Tudor Revival
- NRHP reference No.: 99000605; 16000755 (decrease)

Significant dates
- Added to NRHP: May 20, 1999
- Boundary decrease: November 4, 2016

The William B. Holden House is a house located in southeast Portland, Oregon listed on the National Register of Historic Places. The property was deemed significant for its architecture, for its landscape architecture, and for its association with the life of Dr. W. B. Holden (1873–1955). The house was designed by architect Roscoe Hememway. The landscape architecture was designed by John Alexander Grant. The property included a rose garden.

The listing for the William B. Holden House was for a .75-acre (0.30 ha) property located at 6347 Southeast Yamhill, that consisted of the entire tax lot of Lot I, Belmont Villa, Portland, Oregon.

In 2016, the National Register recorded a boundary decrease listing with address 6353 SE Yamhill, with property name William R. Holden House. This appears to indicate that the 6347 property has been split, and the original .75 acre property is no longer intact. Further the middle initial appears to indicate a typo; the listing would have made sense as a boundary decrease to the William B. Holden House listing. (Note: By Google Maps' Streetview, with photography dating from June 2016, the next residence is a modern residence at 6359 SE Yamhill. In between the William B. Holden House and the 6359 property, there appears to be space adequate for another house to be inserted. In November 2016, the Multnomah County assessor's office map system shows parcel with address 6353 running between the 6347 and 6359 properties. The 6347 property is wrapped on three sides by SE Yamhill, which ascends in the rear (west edge) of the property, turns around the south side, and comes across the front (east side) of the property. The 6353 property adjoins the 6347 property with its rear (west) and its front (east) both on SE Yamhill.)

== See also ==
- National Register of Historic Places listings in Southeast Portland, Oregon
