= Rex Arms Apartments =

Building in Portland, Oregon, U.S.

- U.S. National Register of Historic Places
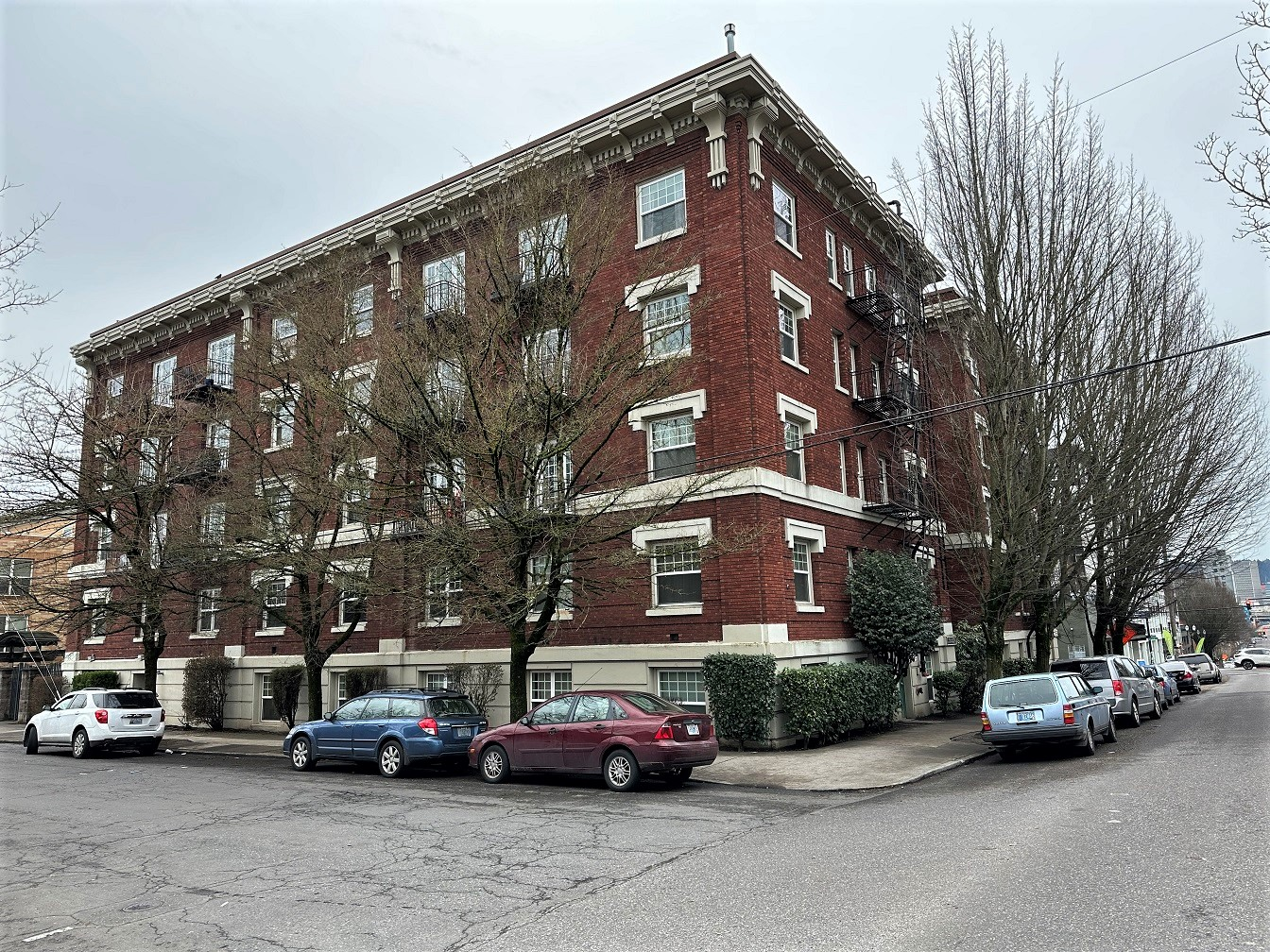
- The building's exterior in 2024

- Location within Portland, Oregon Location within Oregon Location within the United States
- Location: Portland, Oregon, U.S.
- Coordinates: 45°31′01″N 122°39′11″W
- Built: 1913
- Architectural style: Renaissance Revival
- NRHP reference No.: 100009991
- Added to NRHP: February 21, 2024

The Rex Arms Apartments in Portland, Oregon, is a building listed on the National Register of Historic Places. The Renaissance Revival style building was completed in 1913.

== See also ==
- National Register of Historic Places listings in Southeast Portland, Oregon
