= Wilhelmina Mohle House =

Historic building in Portland, Oregon, U.S.

- U.S. National Register of Historic Places
- Portland Historic Landmark
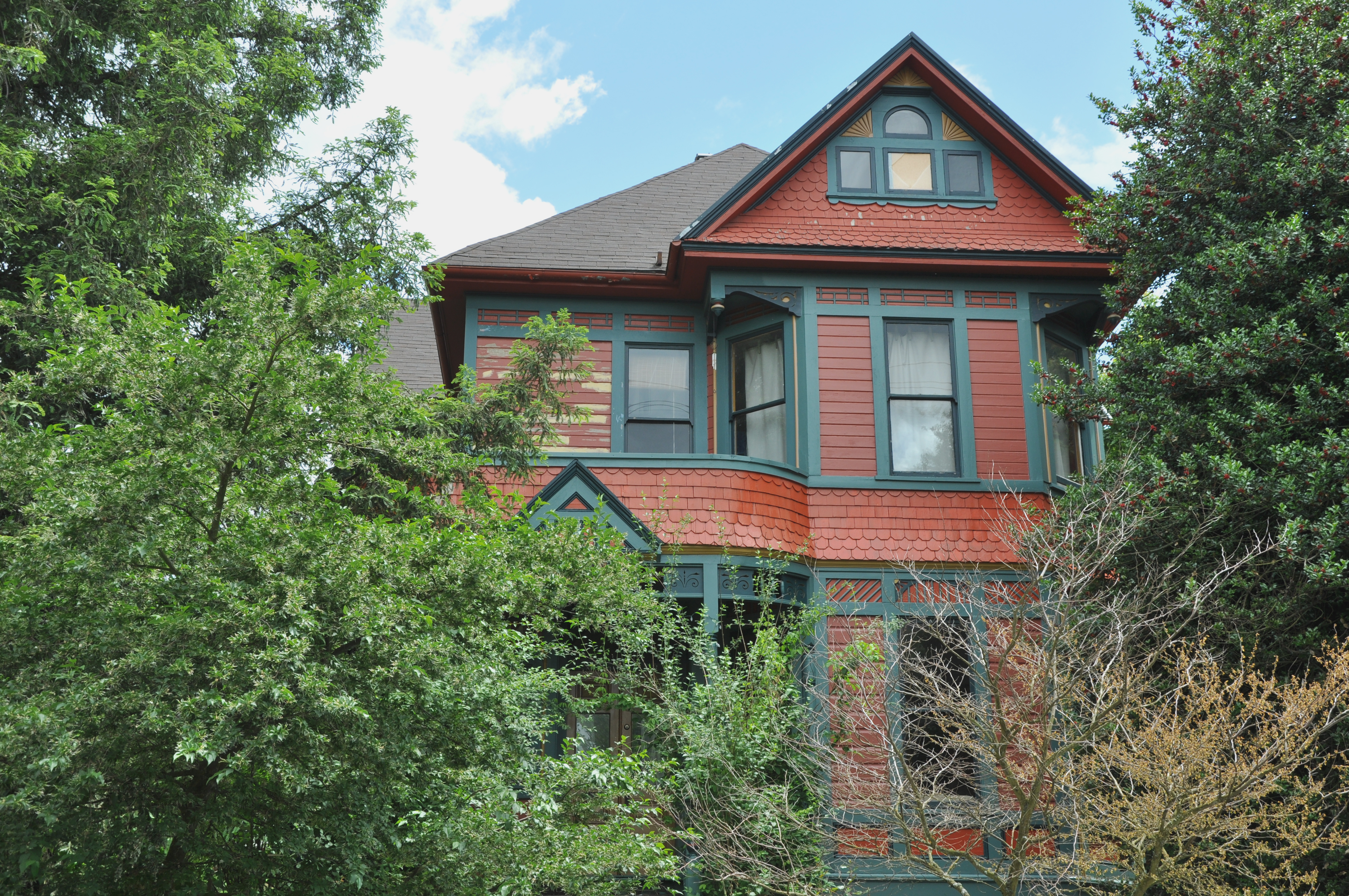
- Wilhelmina Mohle House in 2011

- Location within Portland, Oregon
- Location: 734 SE 34th Avenue; Portland, Oregon
- Coordinates: 45°31′02″N 122°37′45″W
- Built: 1890
- Architectural style: Queen Anne
- MPS: Portland Eastside MPS
- NRHP reference No.: 89000081
- Added to NRHP: March 8, 1989

The Wilhelmina Mohle House is a house in southeast Portland, Oregon, United States, listed on the National Register of Historic Places.

== See also ==
- National Register of Historic Places listings in Southeast Portland, Oregon
