= Laurelhurst Manor Apartments =

Historic building in Portland, Oregon, U.S.

- U.S. National Register of Historic Places
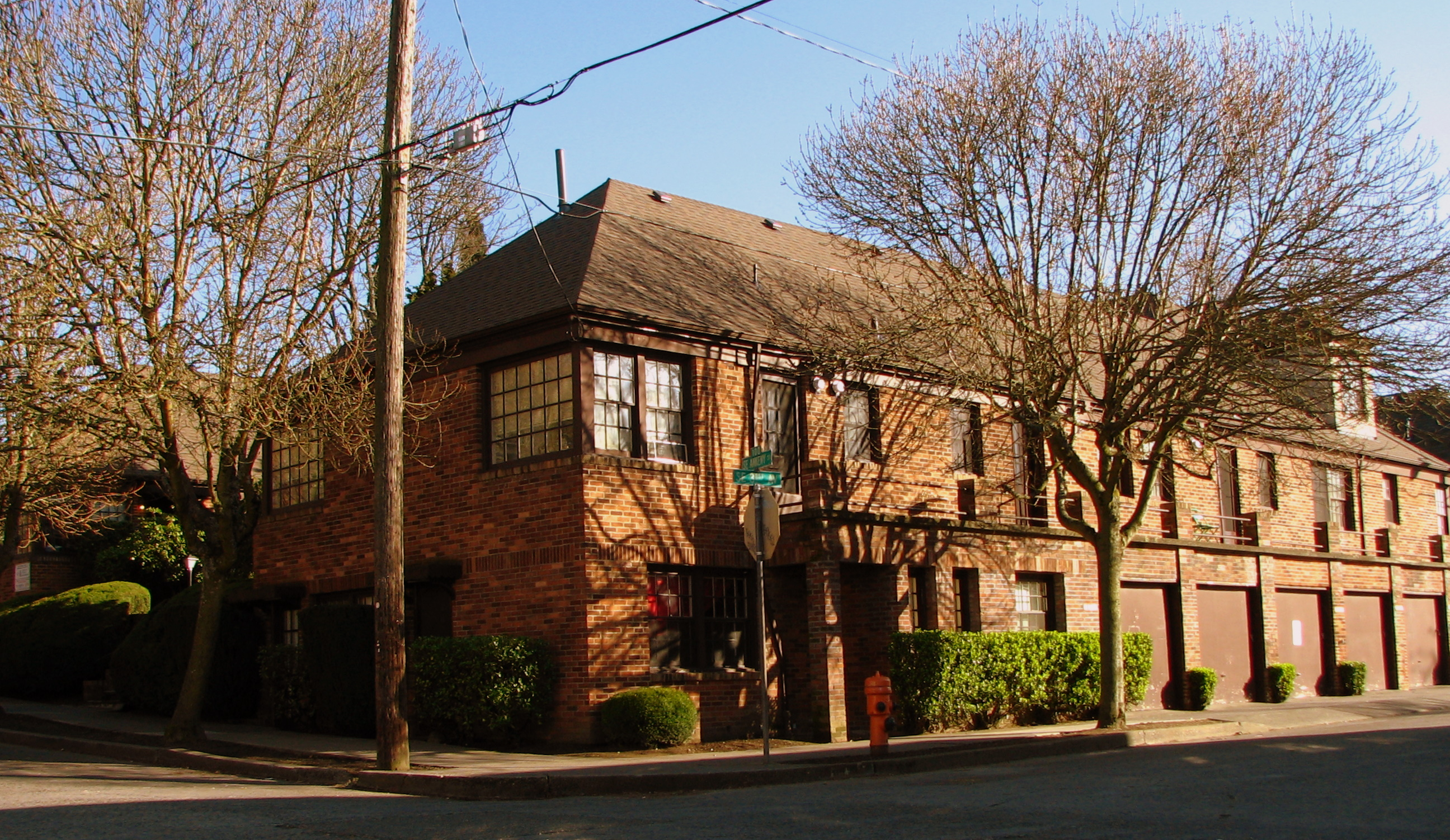
- Laurelhurst Manor Apartments in 2010
- Location: 3100 SE Ankeny Street; Portland, Oregon
- Coordinates: 45°31′19″N 122°37′58″W
- Built: 1941
- Architect: Howard L. Gifford
- Architectural style: Bungalow/Craftsman
- NRHP reference No.: 96001069
- Added to NRHP: October 3, 1996

The Laurelhurst Manor Apartments is a building complex in southeast Portland, Oregon listed on the National Register of Historic Places.

== See also ==
- National Register of Historic Places listings in Southeast Portland, Oregon
