= Elizabeth B. Gowanlock House =

Historic building in Portland, Oregon, U.S.

- U.S. National Register of Historic Places
- Portland Historic Landmark
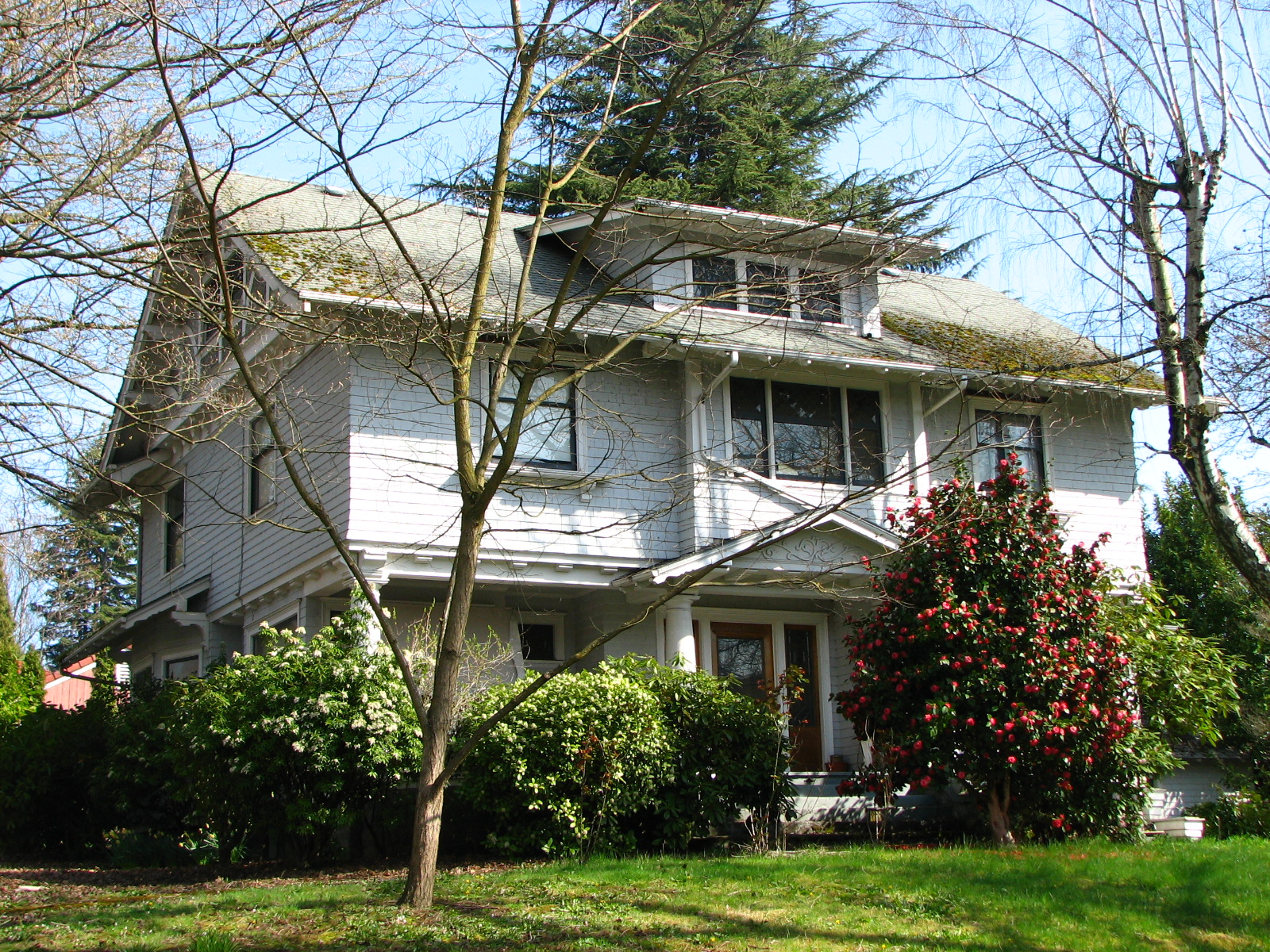
- Elizabeth B. Gowanlock House in 2009

- Location within Portland, Oregon
- Location: 808 SE 28th Avenue; Portland, Oregon
- Coordinates: 45°31′01″N 122°38′13″W
- Built: 1908
- Architectural style: Colonial Revival, Bungalow/Craftsman
- MPS: Portland Eastside MPS
- NRHP reference No.: 89000089
- Added to NRHP: March 8, 1989

The Elizabeth B. Gowanlock House is a house in southeast Portland, Oregon listed on the National Register of Historic Places.

== See also ==
- National Register of Historic Places listings in Southeast Portland, Oregon
