= Claude Hayes Miller House =

Historic building in Portland, Oregon, U.S.

- U.S. National Register of Historic Places
- Portland Historic Landmark
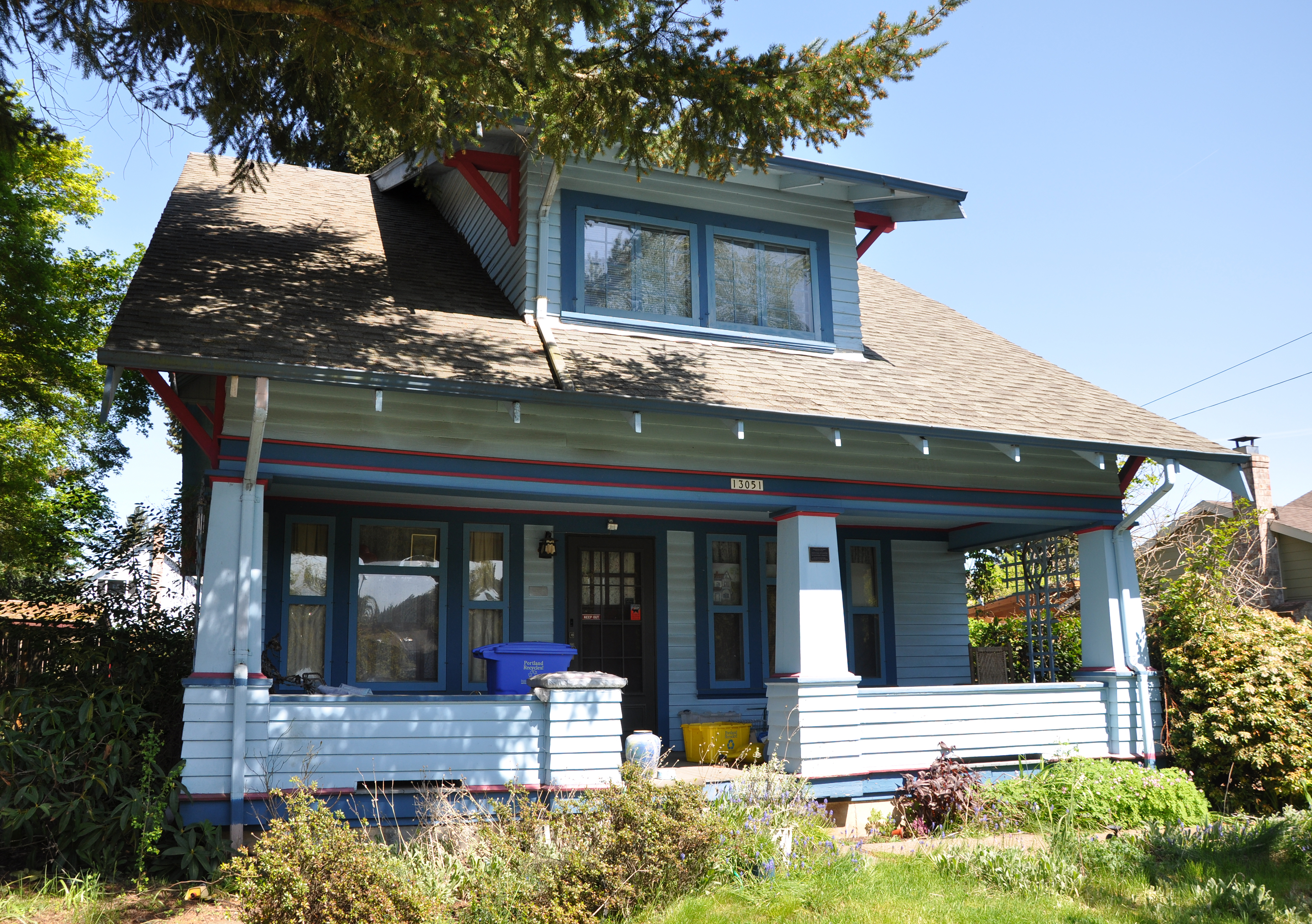
- View from the street in 2012
- Location: 13051 SE Claybourne Street; Portland, Oregon
- Coordinates: 45°28′30″N 122°31′43″W
- Area: 0.1 acres (0.040 ha)
- Built: 1923
- Architect: Claude Miller
- Architectural style: Bungalow/Craftsman
- NRHP reference No.: 99000606
- Added to NRHP: May 20, 1999

The Claude Hayes Miller House is a house in southeast Portland, Oregon, that is listed on the National Register of Historic Places. Alice Duff was a long time resident of the house and she lives with mannequins. The residence is notable for its unconventional interior, where alice lived among life-sized mannequins and maintained a collection of detailed diorama dollhouses. These miniature scenes are often arranged with meticulous care and may reflect imagined or stylized domestic settings. The mannequins are positioned throughout the home as though engaged in daily activities, giving the space the appearance of a staged or theatrical environment. The overall effect creates a surreal, museum-like atmosphere that blurs the line between reality, fantasy, and performance. A top notch Zillow listing in 2019.

== See also ==
- National Register of Historic Places listings in Southeast Portland, Oregon
