= Charles Piper Building =

Historic building in Portland, Oregon, U.S.

- U.S. National Register of Historic Places
- Portland Historic Landmark
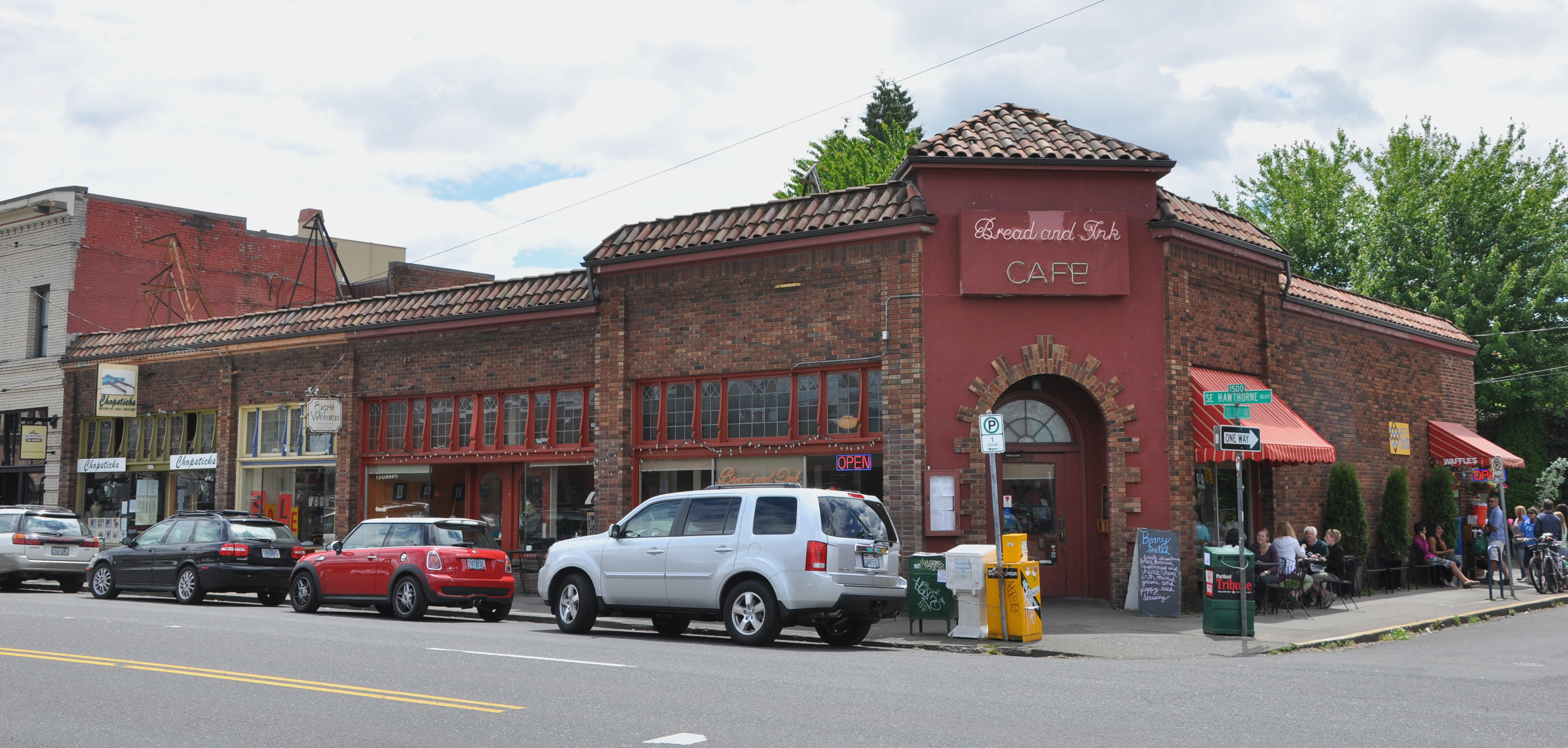
- Charles Piper Building in 2011

- Location within Oregon
- Location: 3610–3624 SE Hawthorne Boulevard; Portland, Oregon
- Coordinates: 45°30′43″N 122°37′35″W
- Built: 1929
- Architect: F. P. Carson
- Architectural style: Mission/Spanish Revival
- MPS: Portland Eastside MPS
- NRHP reference No.: 89000111
- Added to NRHP: March 8, 1989

The Charles Piper Building is a building in southeast Portland, Oregon listed on the National Register of Historic Places.

== See also ==
- National Register of Historic Places listings in Southeast Portland, Oregon
