= Walter F. Burrell House =

Historic house in Portland, Oregon, U.S.

- U.S. National Register of Historic Places
- Portland Historic Landmark
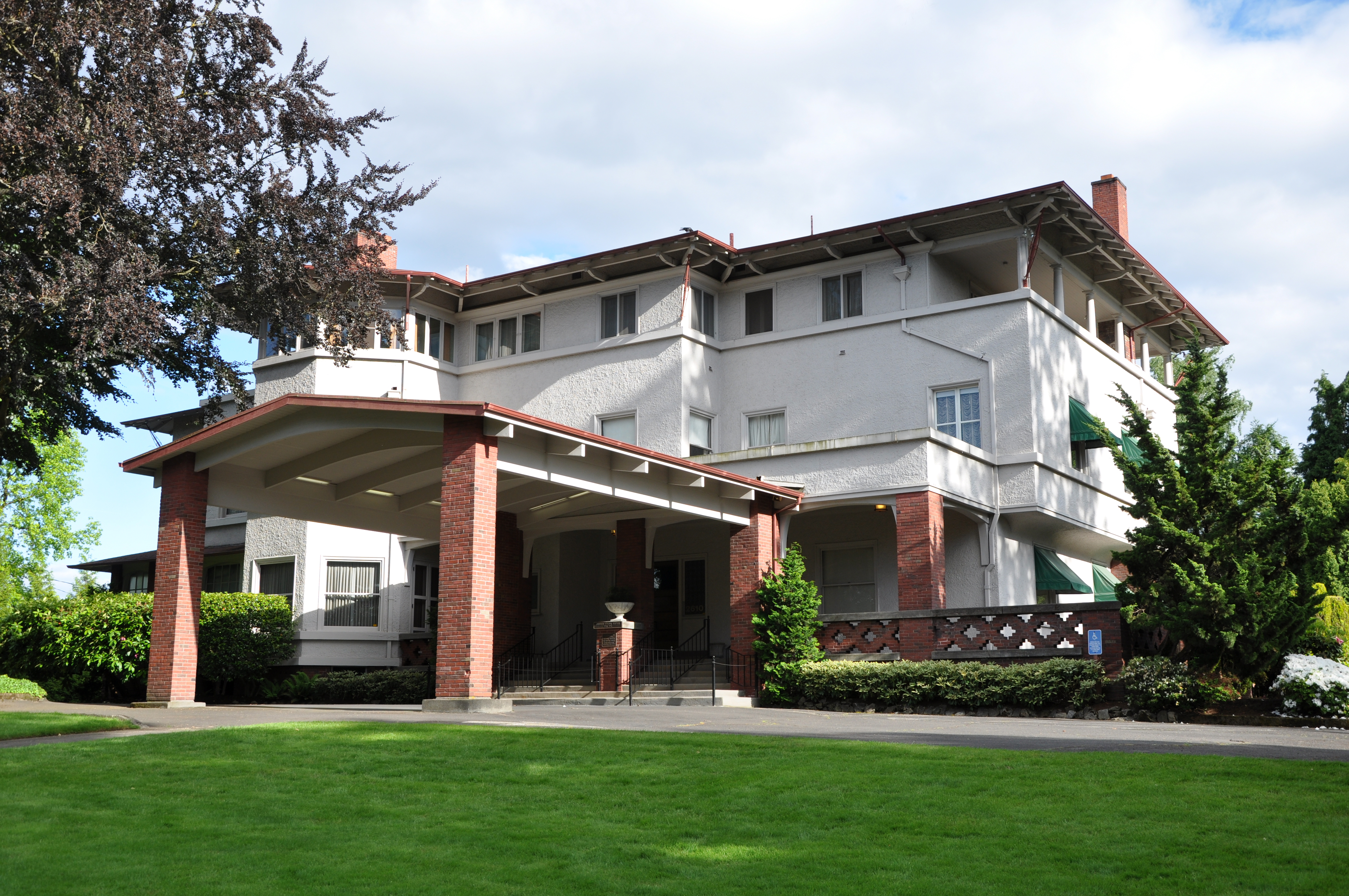
- Walter F. Burrell House in 2011
- Location: 2610 SE Hawthorne Boulevard; Portland, Oregon
- Coordinates: 45°30′42″N 122°38′19″W
- Area: 1.36 acres (0.55 ha) (original); 1.64 acres (0.66 ha) (increase)
- Built: 1901
- Architect: Whidden & Lewis; McKenzie & Wallace
- Architectural style: Prairie School
- NRHP reference No.: 90001593 (original); 91000975 (increase)

Significant dates
- Added to NRHP: October 25, 1990
- Boundary increase: July 26, 1991

The Walter F. Burrell House is a house in southeast Portland, Oregon, listed on the National Register of Historic Places. It is currently a funeral home, having been purchased from the Burrell's in 1923 by the Holman family.

== See also ==
- National Register of Historic Places listings in Southeast Portland, Oregon
