= Pallay Apartments =

Historic building in Portland, Oregon, U.S.

Coordinates: 45.5153°N 122.6591°W

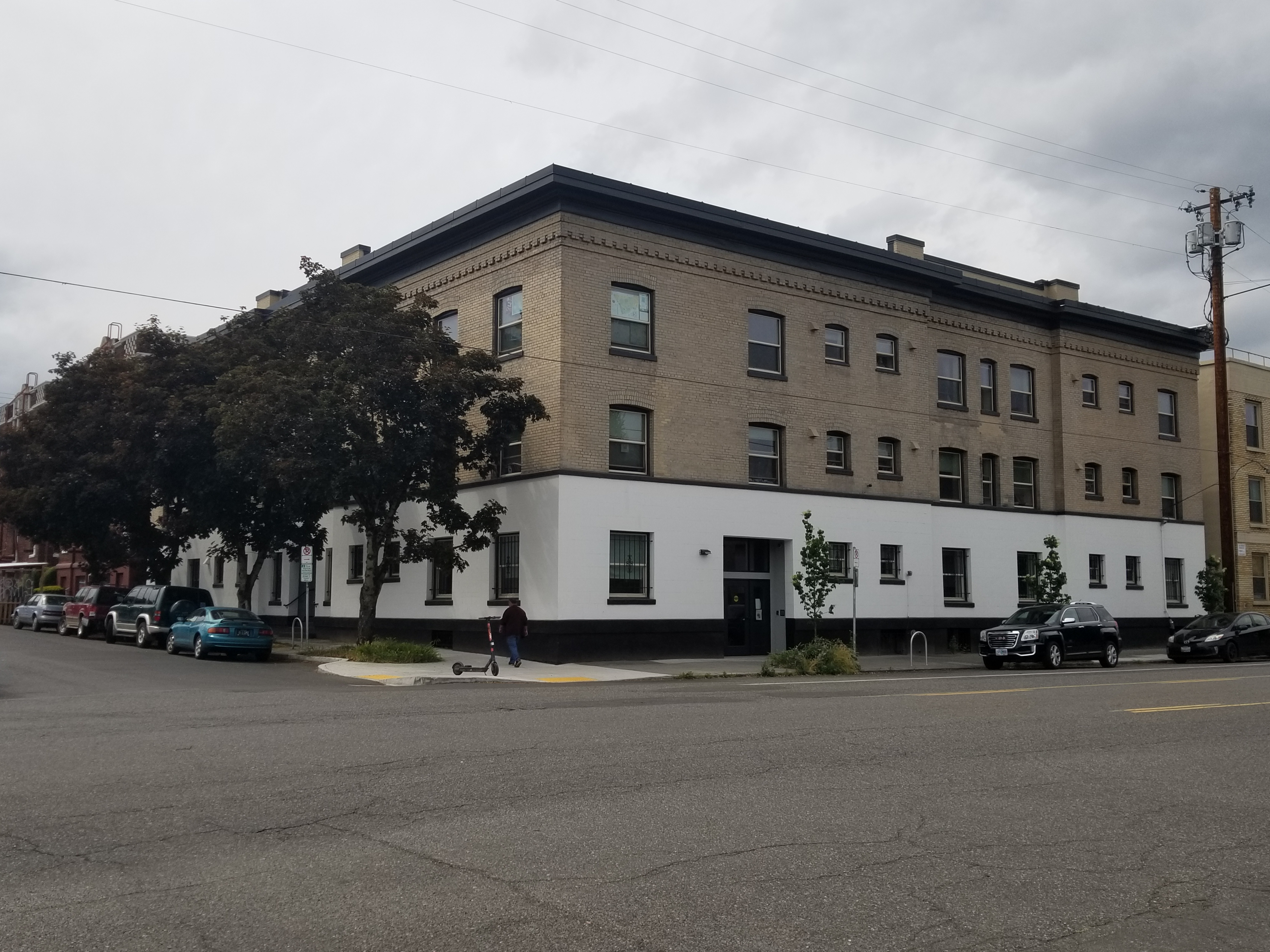
The building's exterior, 2021

The Pallay Apartments is a historic building in southeast Portland, Oregon's Buckman neighborhood. It is listed on the National Register of Historic Places. It was recognized in 2021.

== See also ==
- National Register of Historic Places listings in Southeast Portland, Oregon
