= Henry Kuehle Investment Property =

Historic building in Portland, Oregon, U.S.

- U.S. National Register of Historic Places
- Portland Historic Landmark
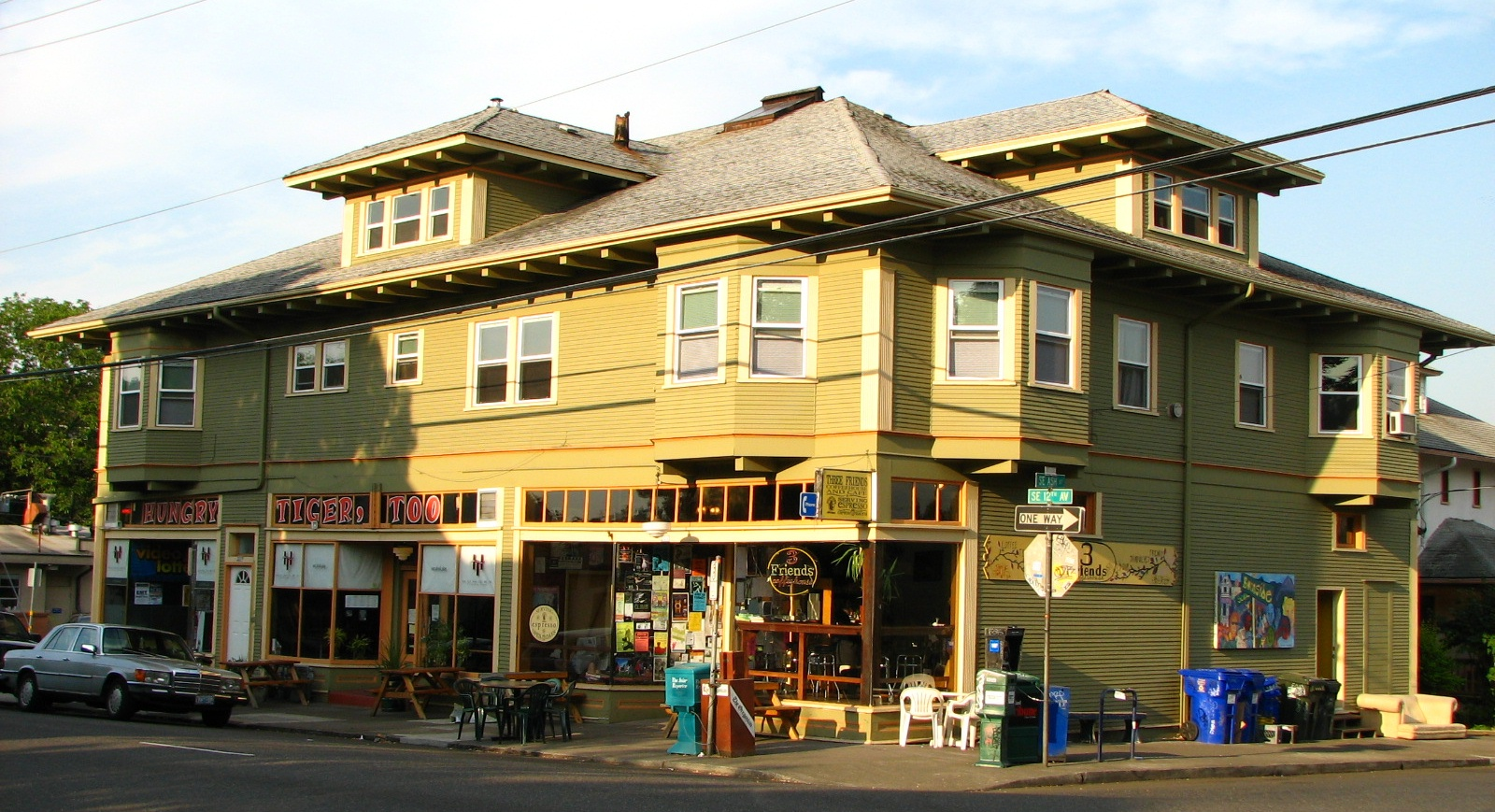
- Kuehle Property in 2008
- Location: 201–213 SE 12th Avenue; Portland, Oregon
- Coordinates: 45°31′17″N 122°39′14″W
- Area: 60 by 40 feet (18 by 12 m)
- Built: 1909
- Architectural style: Bungalow/Craftsman
- MPS: Portland Eastside
- NRHP reference No.: 89000083
- Added to NRHP: March 8, 1989

The Henry Kuehle Investment Property, also known as the Gottsacker Grocery Building, in southeast Portland in the U.S. state of Oregon is a two-story commercial building listed on the National Register of Historic Places. Built in Bungalow/Craftsman style in 1909, it was added to the register in 1989.

The building is a nearly intact example of the wooden commercial-residential buildings that were common in central southeast Portland in the early 20th century. Features include a hip roof, hip dormers, red brick chimneys, exaggerated eaves, and narrow lapped siding. Along the first-floor front of the building are three storefront bays. Two polygonal bays project from opposite ends of the front of the second floor, while two similar bays project from the north face of the second floor.

Originally, the ground floor was meant to accommodate three storefronts, each with its own entrance, but the building was altered to allow a single business to use the combined space. The second floor was designed for residential apartments, which were entered through a separate entrance opening on a stairway leading to an upstairs lobby, access halls, and stairs to the attic.

== History ==
After the construction of bridges over the Willamette River in the late 19th century and subsequent extension of trolley lines over the river, southeast Portland expanded rapidly. By World War I, dense neighborhoods had replaced the scattered housing and open farmland that had characterized the area in the 1880s. Mixed commercial and residential properties came to dominate the first 12 blocks east of the river.

During this period, Henry Kuehle invested money from his successful carriage and automobile business in other ventures. These included construction of the Henry Kuehle Investment Property, which stayed in the Kuehle family until 1972. In 1910, Edward J. and Anna Gottsacker, renting from Kuehle, opened Gottsacker Grocery and Meats on the first floor and lived in one of the second-floor apartments. Moving to Oregon from Wisconsin in the 1880s, they operated a bakery and candy store elsewhere in the city before starting the grocery. The Gottsacker family ran the store for more than 30 years.

== See also ==
- National Register of Historic Places listings in Southeast Portland, Oregon
