= John Deere Plow Company Building =

Historic building in Portland, Oregon, U.S.

- U.S. National Register of Historic Places
- Portland Historic Landmark
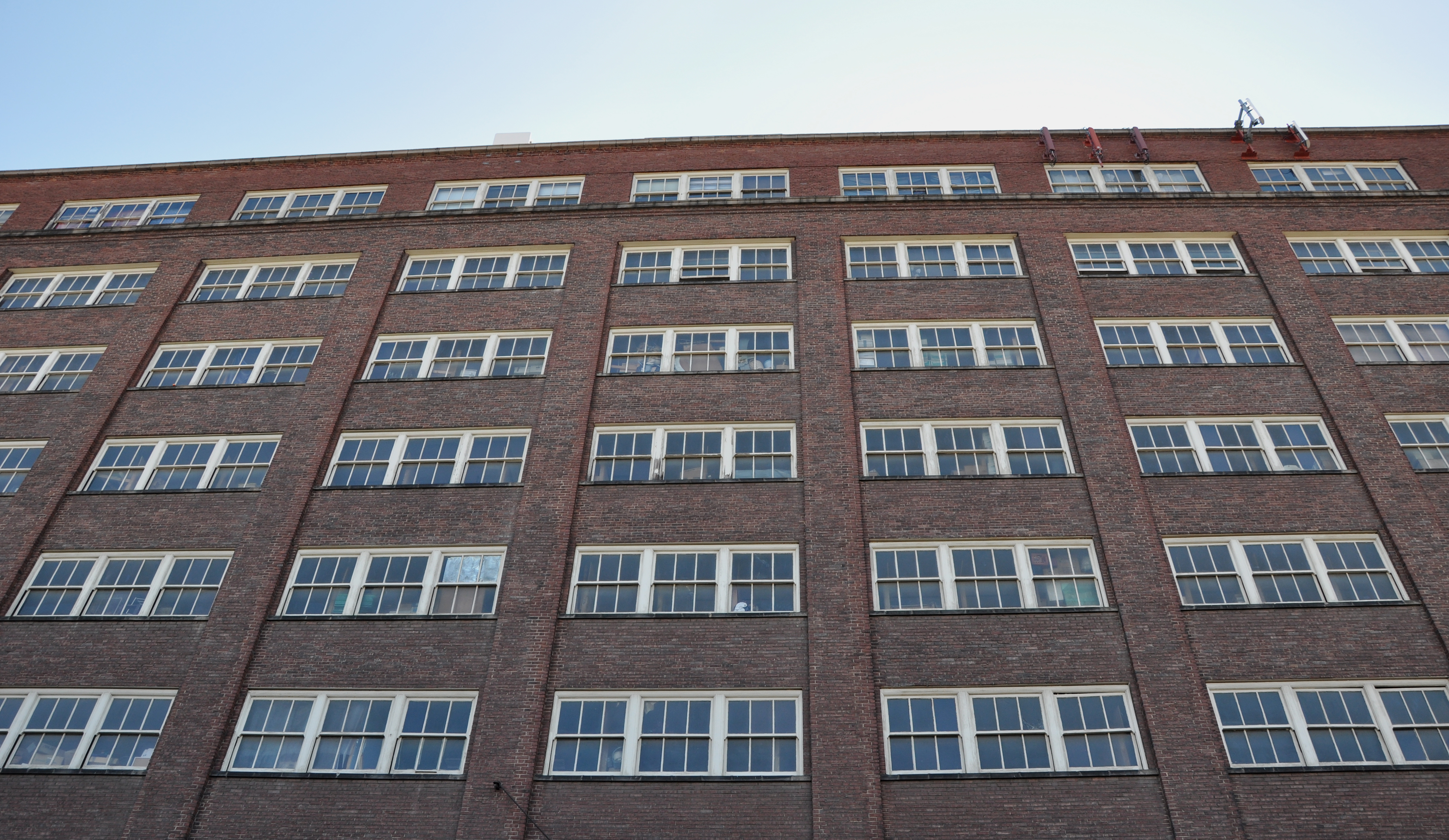
- West face, top six floors, in 2011

- Location within Portland, Oregon
- Location: 215 SE Morrison Street; Portland, Oregon
- Coordinates: 45°31′03″N 122°39′48″W
- Built: 1911
- MPS: Portland Eastside MPS
- NRHP reference No.: 89000097
- Added to NRHP: March 8, 1989

The John Deere Plow Company Building is a building in southeast Portland, Oregon listed on the National Register of Historic Places.

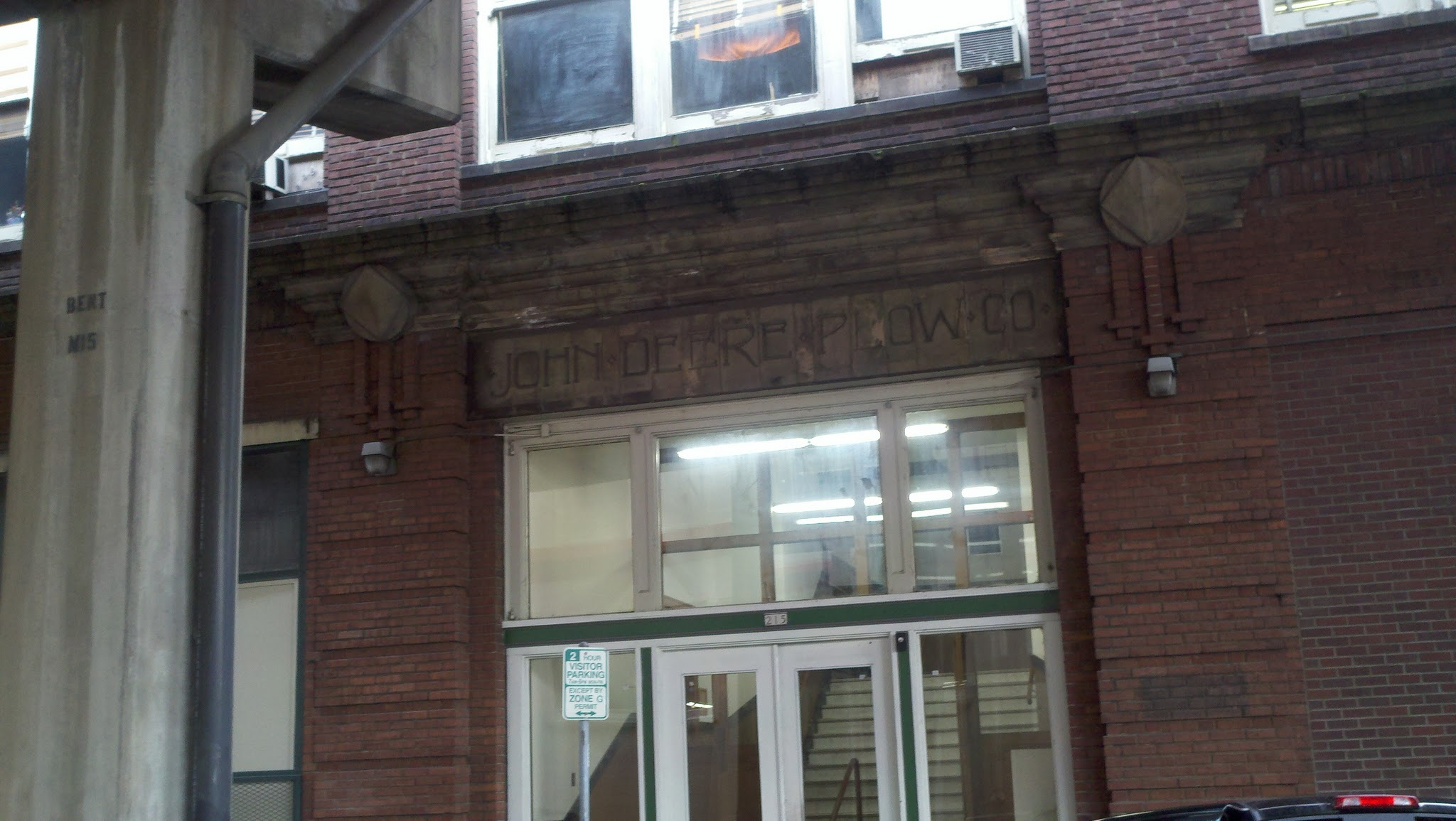
The entrance, now underneath viaduct for Morrison Bridge

== See also ==
- National Register of Historic Places listings in Southeast Portland, Oregon
