= Burrell Heights Apartments =

Historic building in Portland, Oregon, U.S.

- U.S. National Register of Historic Places
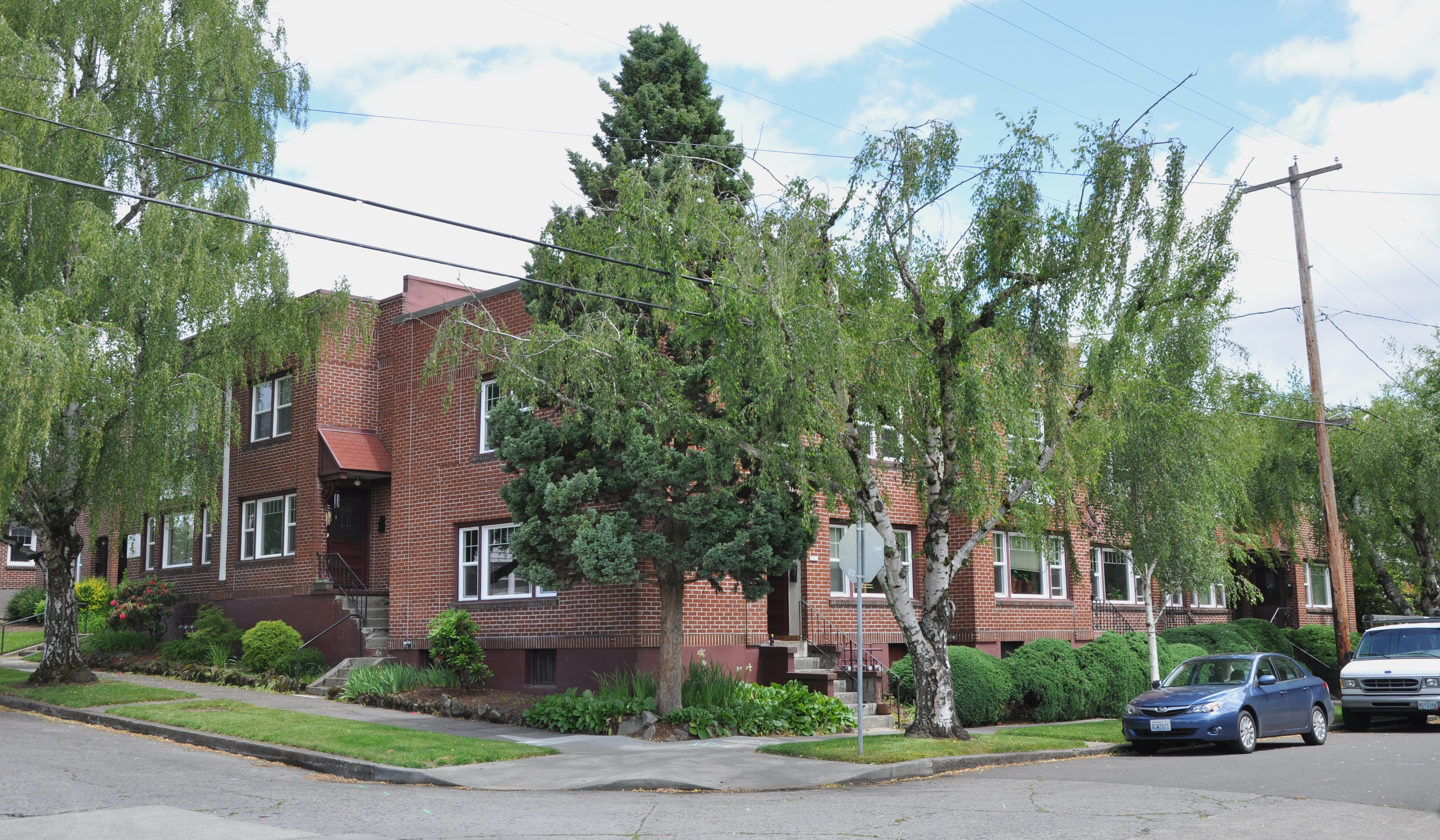
- The Burrell Heights Apartments in 2011
- Location: 2903–2919 SE Clay Street; Portland, Oregon
- Coordinates: 45°30′41″N 122°38′09″W
- Built: 1928
- Architect: Ewald T. Pape
- Architectural style: Modern Movement
- MPS: Middle Class Apartments in East Portland MPS
- NRHP reference No.: 97000120
- Added to NRHP: February 21, 1997

The Burrell Heights Apartments is a building complex in southeast Portland, Oregon listed on the National Register of Historic Places.

== See also ==
- National Register of Historic Places listings in Southeast Portland, Oregon
