= Otto W. and Ida L. Nelson House =

Historic building in Portland, Oregon, U.S.

- U.S. National Register of Historic Places
- Portland Historic Landmark
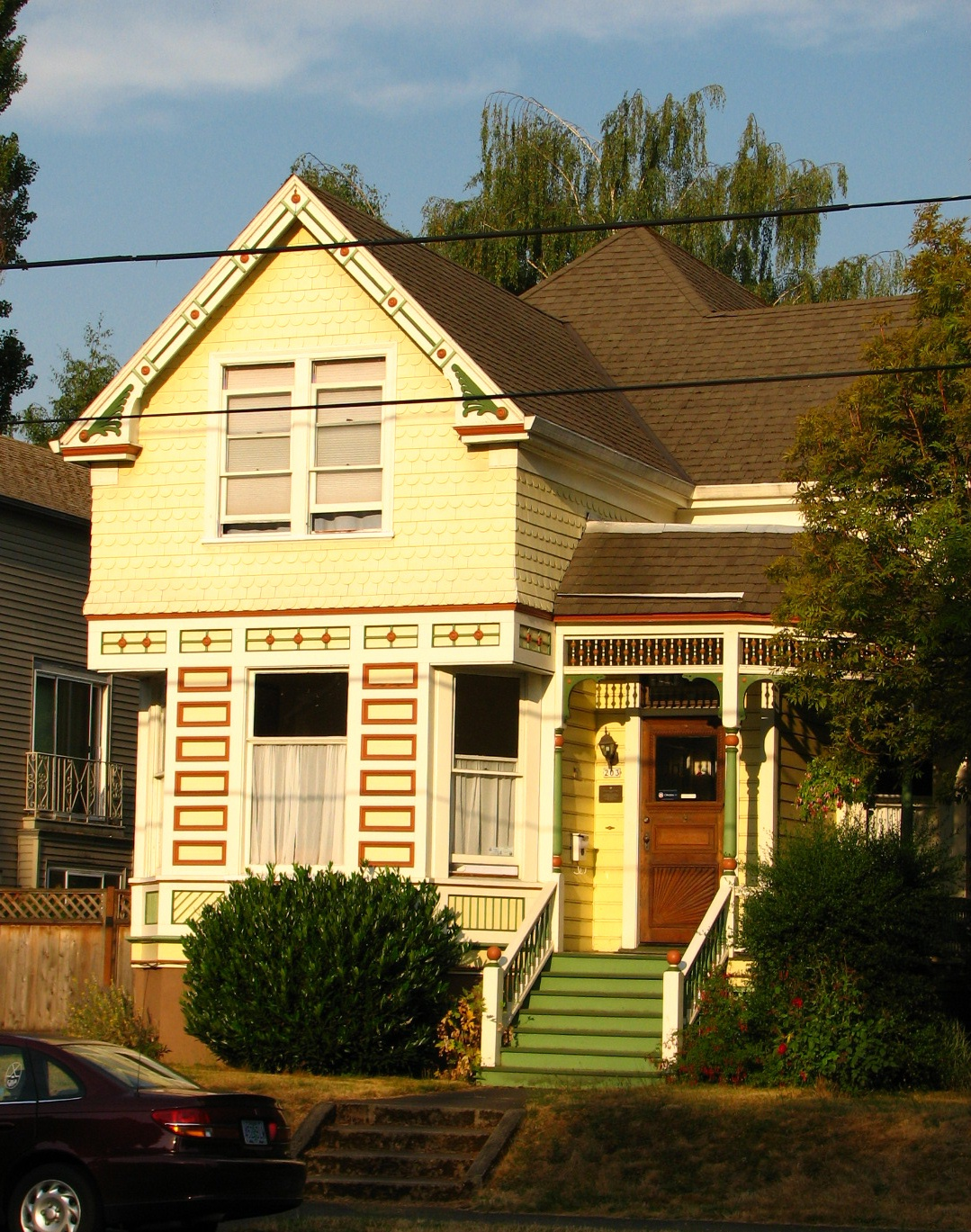
- Otto W. and Ida L. Nelson House in 2008
- Location: 203 SE 15th Avenue; Portland, Oregon
- Coordinates: 45°31′17″N 122°39′03″W
- Built: 1896
- Architectural style: Queen Anne
- MPS: Portland Oregon’s Eastside Historic and Architectural Resources, 1850-1938
- NRHP reference No.: 01000831
- Added to NRHP: August 2, 2001

The Otto W. and Ida L. Nelson House is a house located in southeast Portland, Oregon, listed on the National Register of Historic Places.

== See also ==
- National Register of Historic Places listings in Southeast Portland, Oregon
