= Henry Sensel Building =

Historic building in Portland, Oregon, U.S.

- U.S. National Register of Historic Places
- Portland Historic Landmark
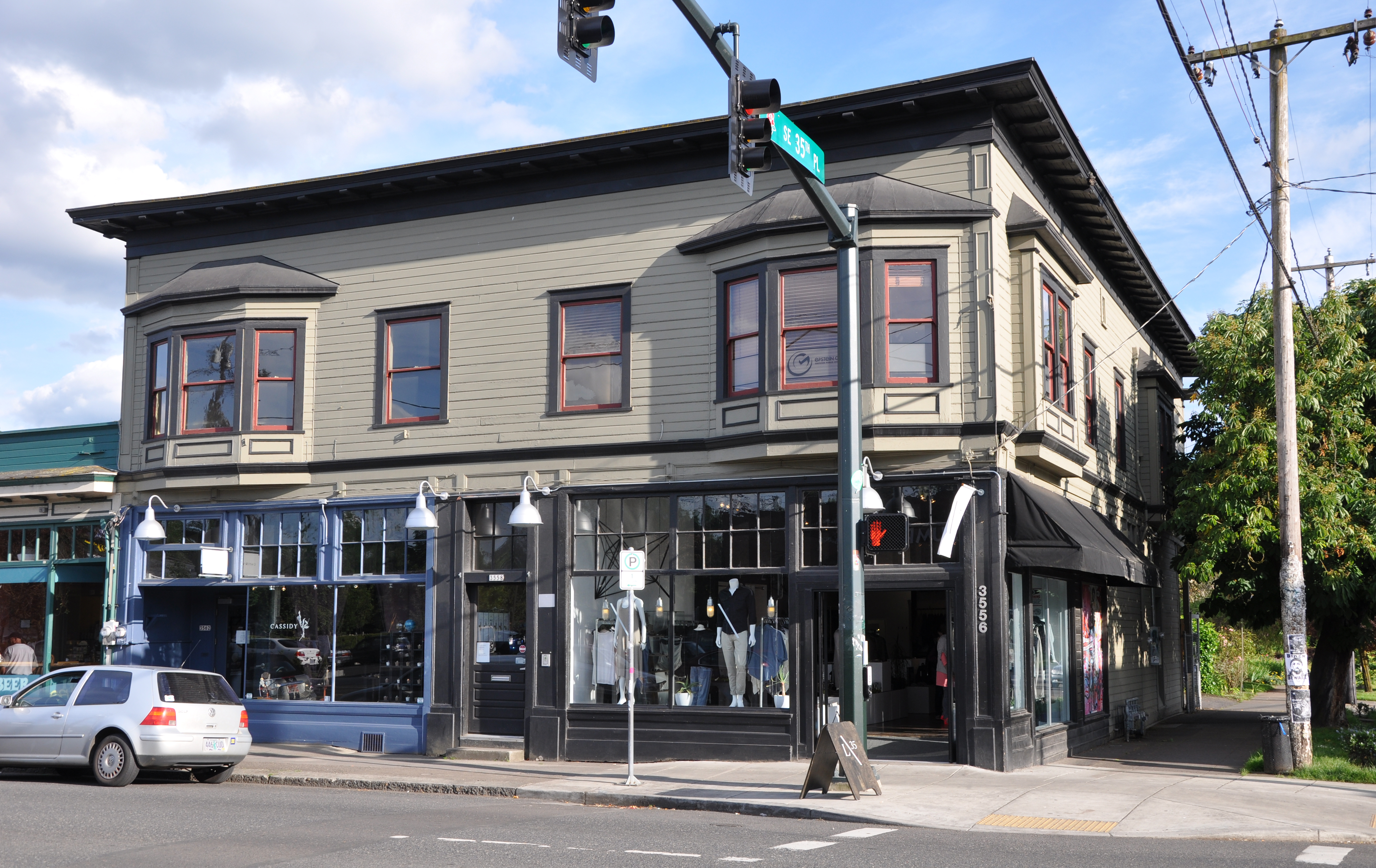
- The building's exterior in 2011

- Location within Portland, Oregon
- Location: 3556–3562 SE Hawthorne Boulevard; Portland, Oregon
- Coordinates: 45°30′43″N 122°37′39″W
- Built: 1909
- MPS: Portland Eastside MPS
- NRHP reference No.: 89000103
- Added to NRHP: March 8, 1989

The Henry Sensel Building is a building in southeast Portland, Oregon, listed on the National Register of Historic Places.

== See also ==
- National Register of Historic Places listings in Southeast Portland, Oregon
