= Nettie Krouse Fourplex =

Historic building in Portland, Oregon, U.S.

- U.S. National Register of Historic Places
- Portland Historic Landmark
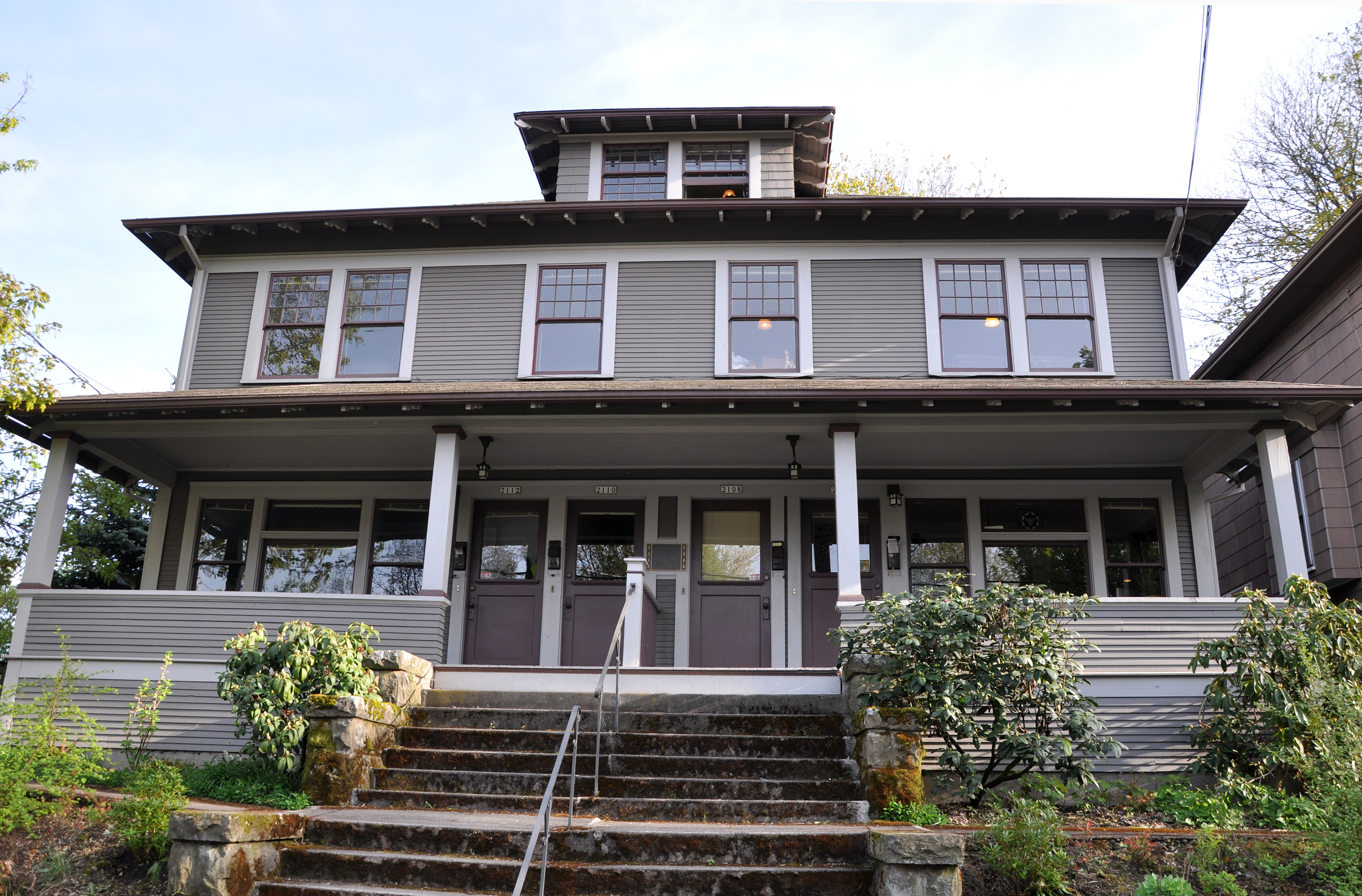
- The Krouse Fourplex in 2011
- Location: 2106–2112 SE Main Street; Portland, Oregon
- Coordinates: 45°30′48″N 122°38′39″W
- Built: 1910
- Architectural style: American Craftsman
- MPS: Portland Eastside
- NRHP reference No.: 89000084
- Added to NRHP: March 8, 1989

The Nettie Krouse Fourplex in southeast Portland in the U.S. state of Oregon is a 2.5-story multiple dwelling listed on the National Register of Historic Places. Built in the American Craftsman style in 1910, it was added to the register in 1989.

The four units of the building are entered through separate exterior doors. Each floor has two apartments that are mirror images of one another. The fourplex is a good example of the many small-scale multi-family dwellings built in this part of Portland between 1905 and 1912. Notable features of the building include its rectangular form, broad overhanging eaves, wide porch, and multi-lit windows.

Krouse, the original owner, at first lived in a house across the street but eventually moved into the apartment building. She resided there until her death in 1954.

== See also ==
- National Register of Historic Places listings in Southeast Portland, Oregon
