= International Harvester Company Warehouse =

Historic building in Portland, Oregon, U.S.

- U.S. National Register of Historic Places
- Portland Historic Landmark
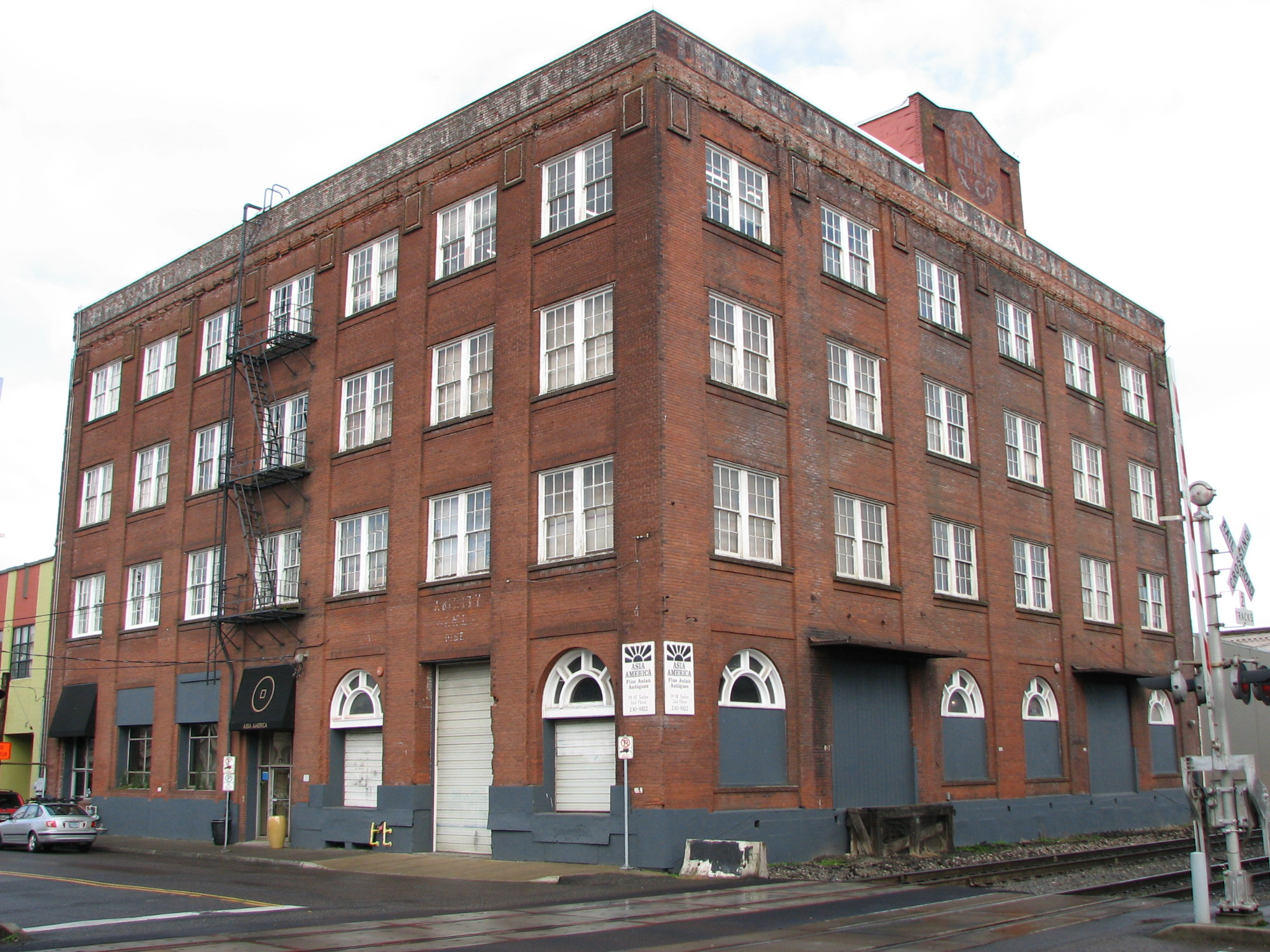
- International Harvester Company Warehouse in 2010
- Location: 79 SE Taylor Street; Portland, Oregon
- Coordinates: 45°30′55″N 122°39′54″W
- Built: 1912
- MPS: Portland Eastside MPS
- NRHP reference No.: 89000088
- Added to NRHP: March 8, 1989

The International Harvester Company Warehouse is a building in southeast Portland, Oregon listed on the National Register of Historic Places.

== See also ==
- National Register of Historic Places listings in Southeast Portland, Oregon
