= Rachel Louise Hawthorne House =

Historic building in Portland, Oregon, U.S.

- U.S. National Register of Historic Places
- Portland Historic Landmark
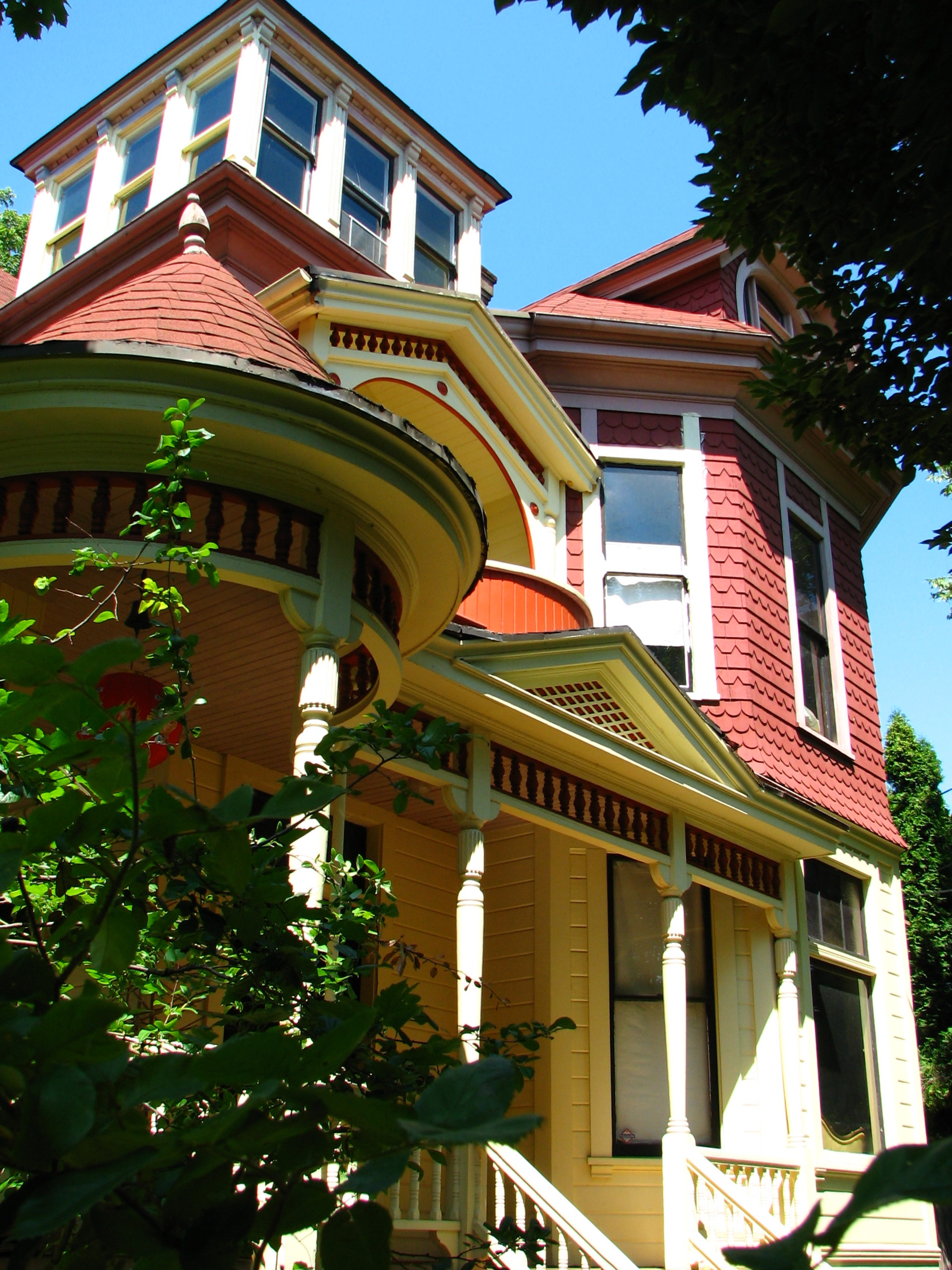
- Rachel Louise Hawthorne House in 2009
- Location: 1007 SE 12th Avenue; Portland, Oregon
- Coordinates: 45°30′56″N 122°39′14″W
- Built: 1892
- Architect: David McKeen
- Architectural style: Queen Anne
- MPS: Portland Eastside MPS
- NRHP reference No.: 89000090
- Added to NRHP: March 8, 1989

The Rachel Louise Hawthorne House is a house in southeast Portland, Oregon listed on the National Register of Historic Places.

== See also ==
- National Register of Historic Places listings in Southeast Portland, Oregon
