= Palestine Lodge =

Historic building in Portland, Oregon, U.S.

- U.S. National Register of Historic Places
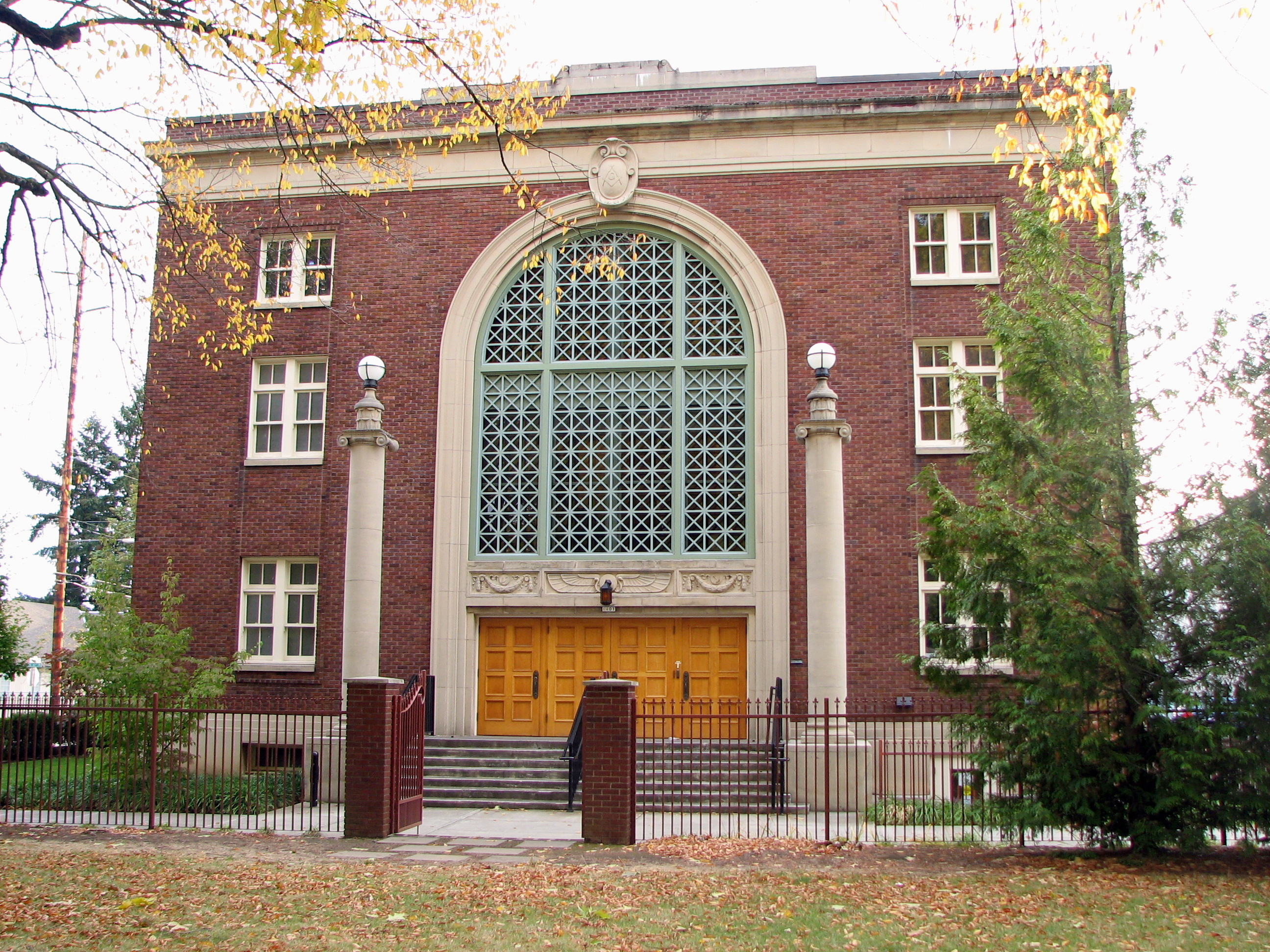
- Palestine Lodge in 2009

- Location within Portland, Oregon
- Location: 6401 SE Foster Road; Portland, Oregon
- Coordinates: 45°29′24″N 122°35′48″W
- Built: 1926
- Architect: Orio R. W. Hossack
- Architectural style: Beaux Arts, Exotic Revival
- NRHP reference No.: 05001149
- Added to NRHP: October 4, 2005

The Palestine Lodge is a Masonic lodge building in southeast Portland, Oregon listed on the National Register of Historic Places.

== See also ==
- National Register of Historic Places listings in Southeast Portland, Oregon
