= Enterprise Planing Mill =

Historic building in Portland, Oregon, U.S.

- U.S. National Register of Historic Places
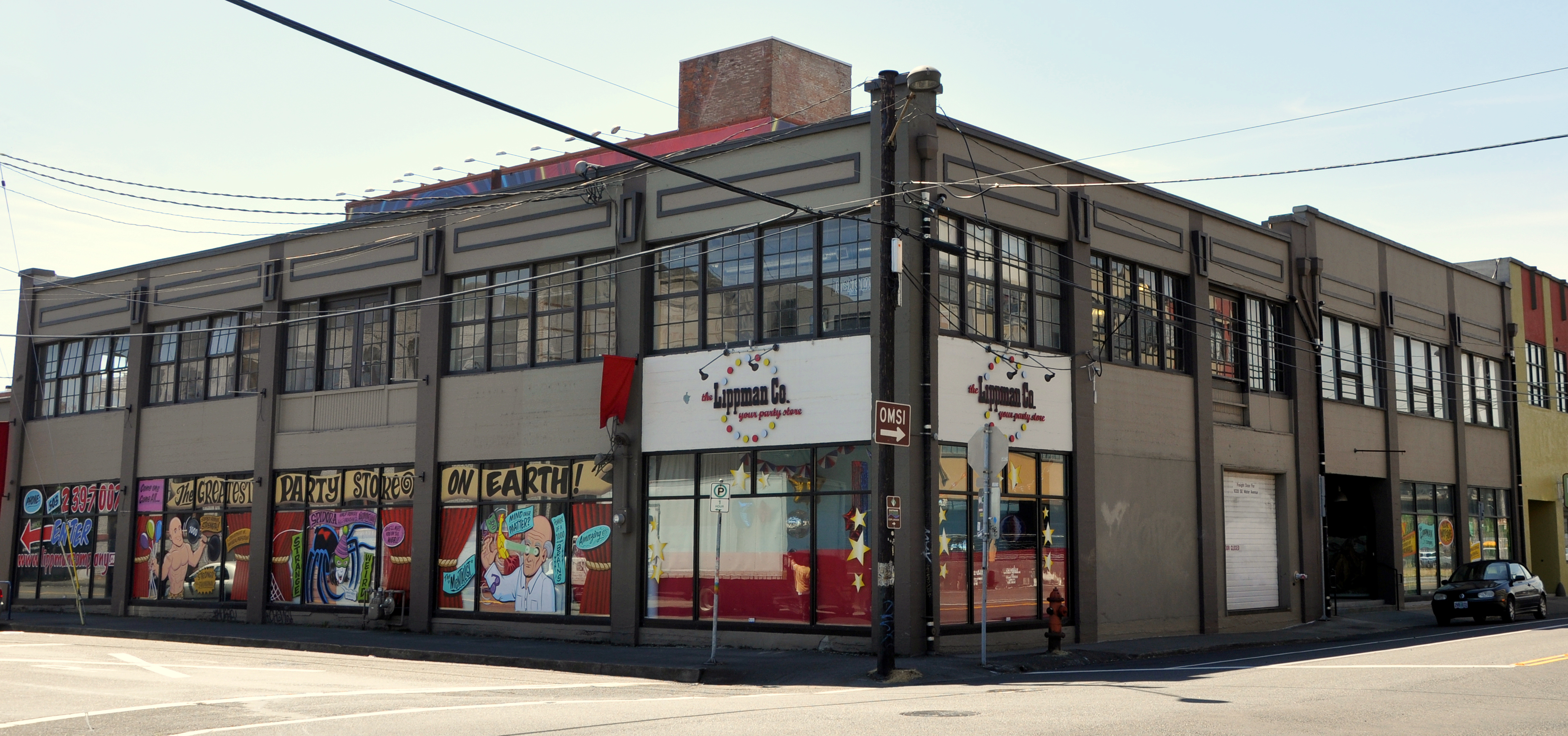
- The Enterprise Planing Mill in 2011
- Location: 50 SE Yamhill Street; Portland, Oregon
- Coordinates: 45°30′56″N 122°39′56″W
- Built: 1915
- Architectural style: Early Commercial
- MPS: Portland Eastside MPS
- NRHP reference No.: 06000097
- Added to NRHP: March 2, 2006

The Enterprise Planing Mill is a building in southeast Portland, Oregon, listed on the National Register of Historic Places.

== See also ==
- National Register of Historic Places listings in Southeast Portland, Oregon
