= Eugenia Apartments =

Historic building in Portland, Oregon, U.S.

- U.S. National Register of Historic Places
- Portland Historic Landmark
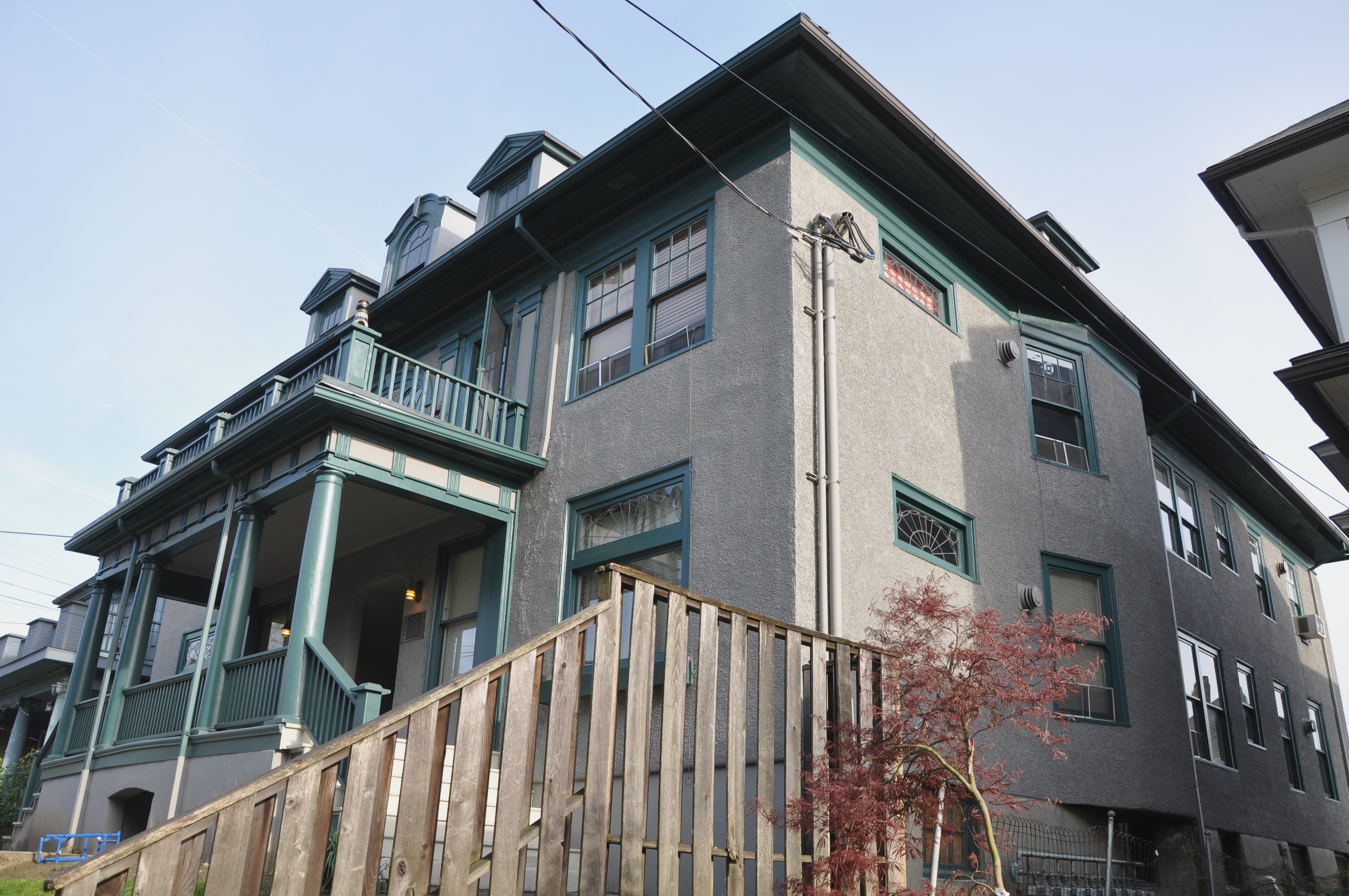
- Eugenia Apartments in 2011
- Location: 1314 SE Salmon Street; Portland, Oregon
- Coordinates: 45°30′51″N 122°39′08″W
- Area: less than 1 acre (0.40 ha)
- Built: 1911
- Architectural style: Colonial Revival with stucco siding
- NRHP reference No.: 89000094
- Added to NRHP: March 8, 1989

The Eugenia Apartments in southeast Portland in the U.S. state of Oregon is a two-story apartment building listed on the National Register of Historic Places. A Colonial Revival structure built in 1911, it was added to the register in 1989.

The nomination form for the building describes it as a well-preserved example of the many medium-scale multi-family dwellings built in inner southeast Portland between 1910 and 1930. The Eugenia Apartments has four apartments on each of its main floors as well as three living units in the basement. Pedimented and arched dormers, a formal facade and prominent portico, and decorative details such as fanlights are among the building's notable features.

== See also ==
- National Register of Historic Places listings in Southeast Portland, Oregon
