= Joseph Kendall House =

Historic building in Portland, Oregon, U.S.

- U.S. National Register of Historic Places
- Portland Historic Landmark
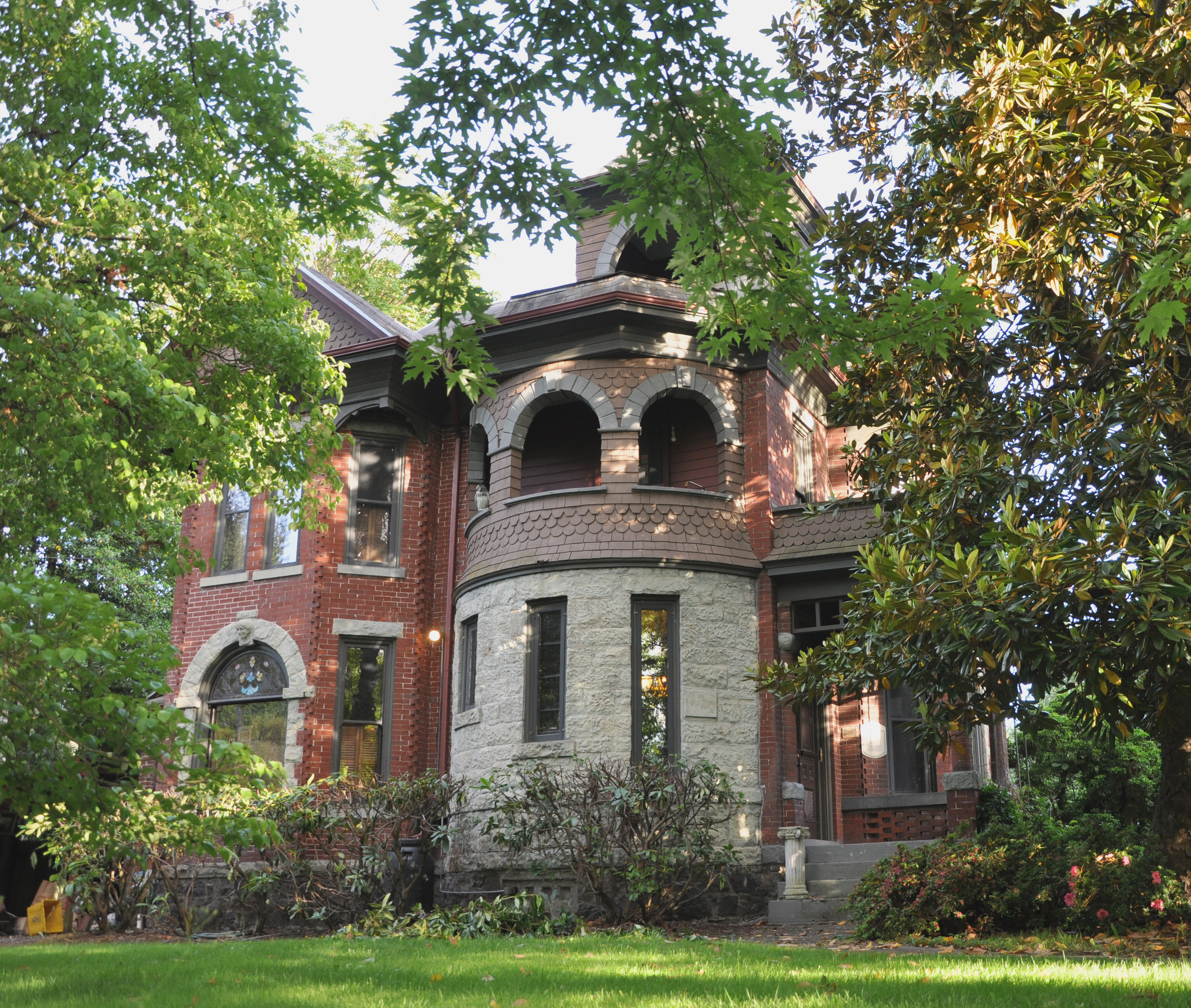
- Joseph Kendall House 2011
- Location: 3908 SE Taggart Street; Portland, Oregon
- Coordinates: 45°30′09″N 122°37′20″W
- Built: 1884
- Architect: Kendall, Joseph
- Architectural style: Queen Anne, Romanesque
- NRHP reference No.: 79002134
- Added to NRHP: August 29, 1979

The Joseph Kendall House is a house in southeast Portland, Oregon, that is listed on the National Register of Historic Places.

== See also ==
- National Register of Historic Places listings in Southeast Portland, Oregon
