= Martin Parelius Fourplex =

Historic building in Portland, Oregon, U.S.

- U.S. National Register of Historic Places
- Portland Historic Landmark
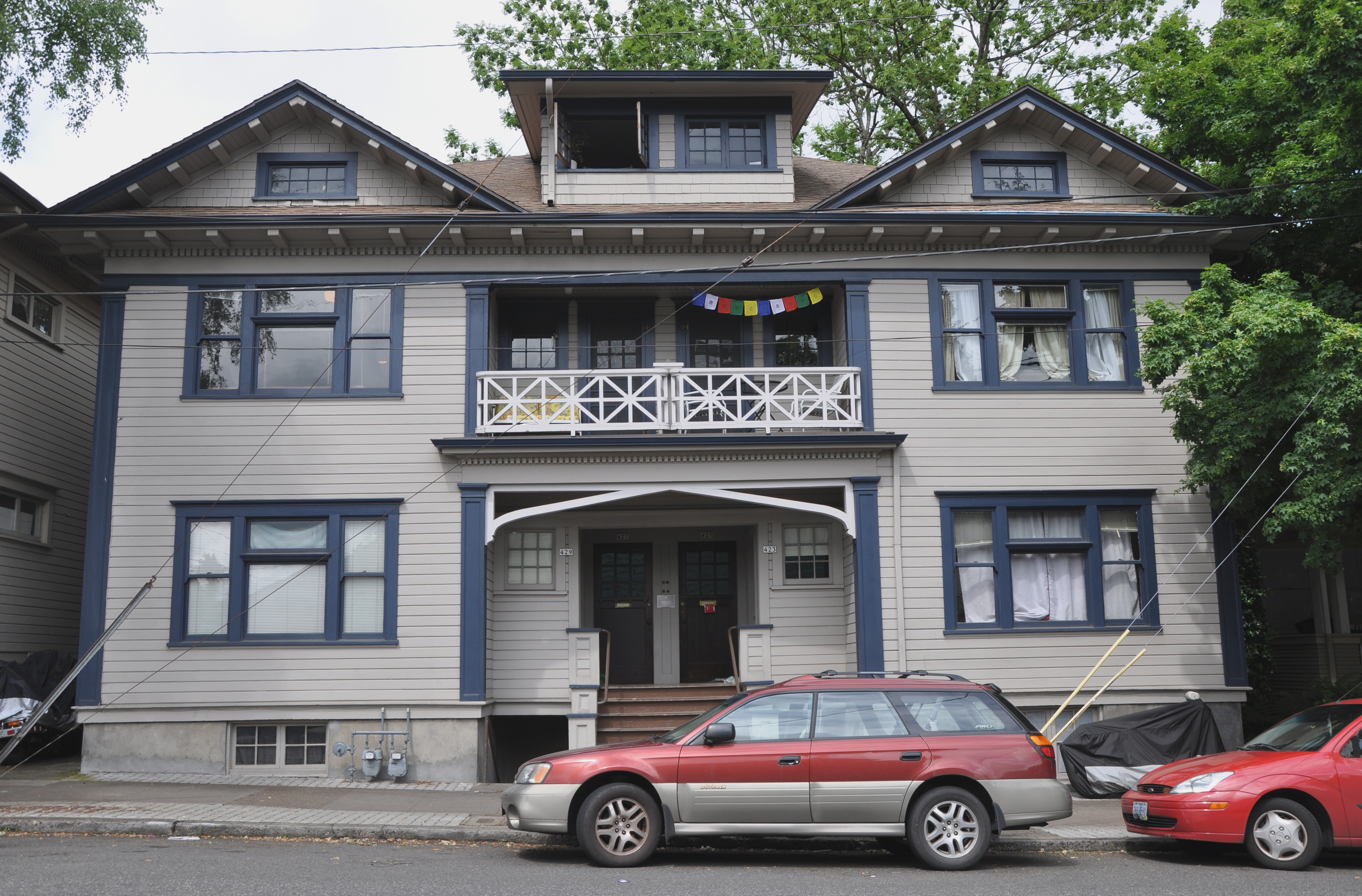
- Martin Parelius Fourplex in 2011
- Location: 423–439 SE 28th Avenue; Portland, Oregon
- Coordinates: 45°31′10″N 122°38′15″W
- Built: 1911
- Architectural style: Colonial Revival, Bungalow/Craftsman
- MPS: Portland Eastside MPS
- NRHP reference No.: 89000112
- Added to NRHP: March 8, 1989

The Martin Parelius Fourplex is a building in southeast Portland, Oregon listed on the National Register of Historic Places.

== See also ==
- National Register of Historic Places listings in Southeast Portland, Oregon
