= Scott House =

Scott House or Scott Farm may refer to:

== United States ==
(by state, then city)

- Scott-Yarbrough House, Auburn, Alabama, listed on the National Register of Historic Places (NRHP)
- Leiper-Scott House, Little Rock, Arkansas, listed on the NRHP in Arkansas
- Scott-Davis House, Romance, Arkansas, listed on the NRHP in Arkansas
- Drennen-Scott House, Van Buren, Arkansas, listed on the NRHP in Arkansas
- Robert Scott House, Mesa, Arizona, listed on the NRHP in Arizona
- Hoyt-Scott House, Point Arena, California, listed on the NRHP in California
- Hiram D. Scott House, Scotts Valley, California, listed on the NRHP in California
- Lewis June House, also known as Scott House, in Ridgefield, Connecticut, NRHP-listed
- Josiah Scott House, Annis, Idaho, NRHP-listed
- Scott–Vrooman House, Bloomington, Illinois, NRHP-listed
- Matthew T. Scott House, Chenoa, Illinois, NRHP-listed
- Lyman Scott House, Summer Hill, Illinois, NRHP-listed
- Scott-Lucas House, Morocco, Indiana, listed on the NRHP in Indiana
- Andrew F. Scott House, Richmond, Indiana, listed on the NRHP in Indiana
- Mary A. and Caleb D. Scott House, Des Moines, Iowa, listed on the NRHP in Iowa
- Scott and Wilson Houses District, Lexington, Kentucky, listed on the NRHP in Kentucky
- Scott House (Little Hickman, Kentucky), listed on the NRHP in Kentucky
- John Harvey Scott House, Nicholasville, Kentucky, listed on the NRHP in Kentucky
- Dill Scott House, Somerset, Kentucky, listed on the NRHP in Kentucky
- Thomas Scott House (Gloster, Louisiana), NRHP-listed
- Upton Scott House, Annapolis, Maryland, NRHP-listed
- Robert and Phyllis Scott House, Westminster, Maryland, NRHP-listed
- Eaton–Prescott House, Reading, Massachusetts, NRHP-listed
- Capt. George Scott House, Wiscasset, Maine, NRHP-listed
- Jim Scott Fishhouse, Grand Marais, Minnesota, listed on the NRHP in Minnesota
- Scott-Forhan House, Kalispell, Montana, listed on the NRHP in Flathead County, Montana
- Gen. Winfield Scott House, New York, New York, NRHP-listed
- Scott-Edwards House, New York, New York, NRHP-listed
- Thomas Scott House (Greensboro, North Carolina), listed on the NRHP in North Carolina
- Kerr Scott Farm, Haw River, North Carolina, listed on the NRHP in North Carolina
- Henderson Scott Farm Historic District, Mebane, North Carolina, listed on the NRHP in North Carolina
- McCracken-Scott House, Cambridge, Ohio, listed on the NRHP in Ohio
- George Scott House, Cincinnati, Ohio, NRHP-listed
- Studabaker-Scott House and Beehive School, Greenville, Ohio, NRHP-listed
- William Scott House, Hillsboro, Ohio, listed on the NRHP in Ohio
- John Scott Barn and Granary, Shandon, Ohio, NRHP-listed
- Coleman–Scott House, Portland, Oregon, NRHP-listed
- Leslie M. Scott House, Portland, Oregon, NRHP-listed
- Thomas Scott House (Coatesville, Pennsylvania), NRHP-listed
- David Scott House, Coatesville, Pennsylvania, NRHP-listed
- James Scott House, Pittsburgh, Pennsylvania, NRHP-listed
- Claudius Scott Cottage, Eastover, South Carolina, NRHP-listed
- Scott House (Kingstree, South Carolina), listed on the NRHP in South Carolina
- Andrew Scott House, Culleoka, Tennessee, listed on the NRHP in Tennessee
- Scott Mansion, Tellico Plains, Tennessee, listed on the NRHP in Tennessee
- Scott, Zachary T. and Sallie Lee, Sr. House, Austin, Texas, listed on the NRHP in Texas
- Scott-Majors House, Colorado City, Texas, listed on the NRHP in Texas
- Thomason-Scott House, Era, Texas, listed on the NRHP in Texas
- Wharton–Scott House, Fort Worth, Texas, NRHP-listed
- L. A. Scott House, McKinney, Texas, listed on the NRHP in Texas
- A. M. Scott House, McKinney, Texas, listed on the NRHP in Texas
- Scott-Roden Mansion, Paris, Texas, listed on the NRHP in Texas
- Scott Farm Historic District, Dummerston, Vermont, listed on the NRHP in Vermont
- Scott–Walker House, Saltville, Virginia, NRHP-listed
- William Scott Farmstead, Windsor, Virginia, NRHP-listed
- Scott House (Hampton, Virginia), NRHP-listed
- Scott House (Richmond, Virginia), NRHP-listed

== See also ==
- Thomas Scott House (disambiguation)
