= Statue of Harvey W. Scott =

Statue by Gutzon Borglum in Portland, Oregon, USA

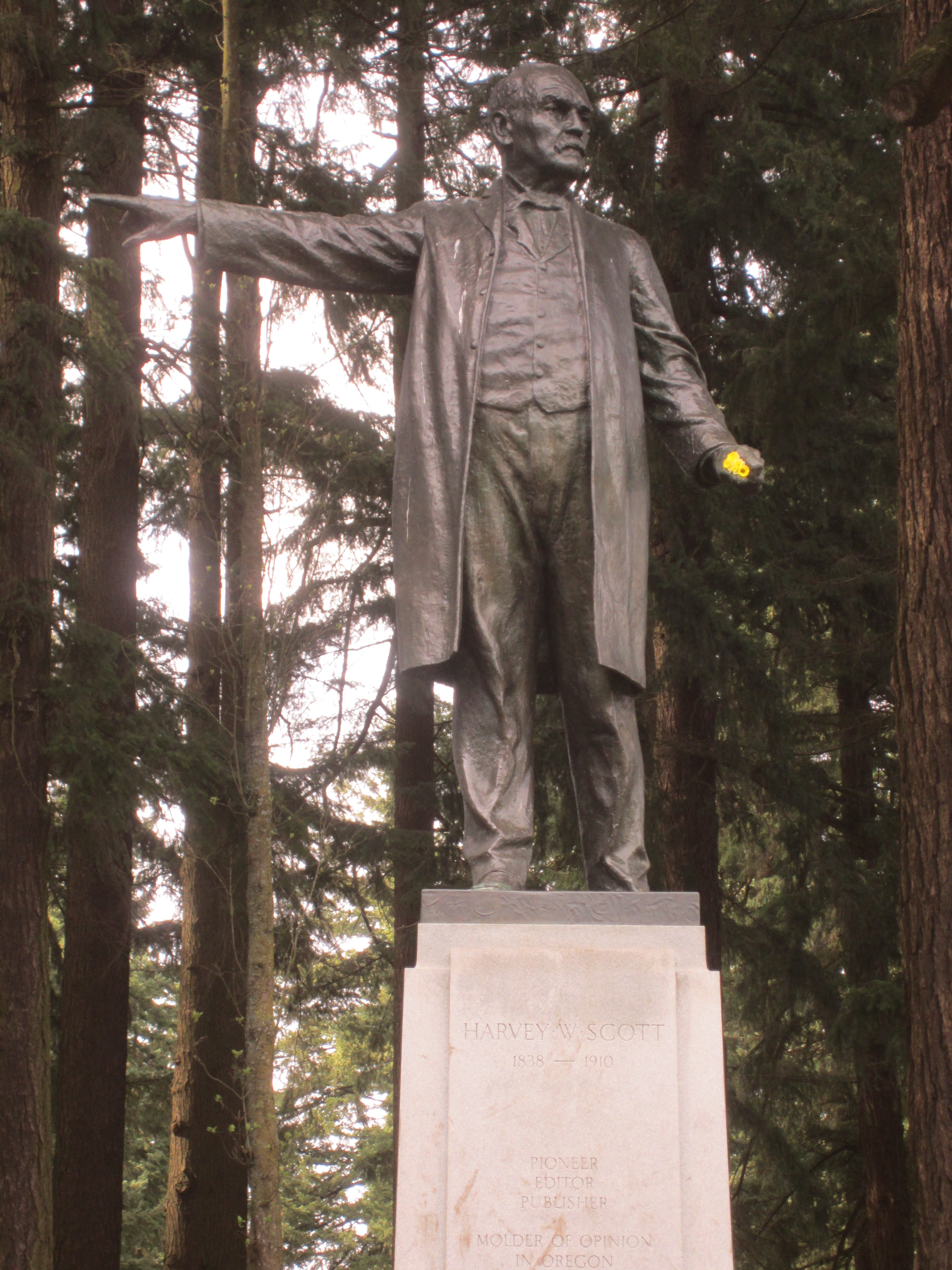
- The statue in 2012
- Artist: Gutzon Borglum
- Year: 1933
- Medium: Bronze sculpture
- Subject: Harvey W. Scott
- Dimensions: 3.4 m × 1.1 m × 1.2 m (132 in × 44 in × 47 in)
- Weight: 2 tons
- Condition: "Well maintained" (1993)
- Location: Portland, Oregon, U.S.; 45.51162°N 122.59240°W
- Owner: City of Portland and Multnomah County Public Art Collection courtesy of the Regional Arts & Culture Council

A bronze sculpture of American pioneer, newspaper editor and historian Harvey W. Scott (1838–1910) by Gutzon Borglum, sometimes called Harvey Scott or Harvey W. Scott, was installed on Mount Tabor in Portland, Oregon, United States, until being toppled in October 2020. The city is currently in the process of deaccessioning the statue and replacing it with a sculpture of York.

Modeled in 1930 and sculpted in 1933, the statue is among Borglum's final works and was donated by Scott's family. The memorial's dedication ceremony was attended by 3,000 people, including Governor Julius Meier, Portland mayor Joseph K. Carson, and Chester Harvey Rowell, as well as members of Scott's family, who created a maintenance fund during the 1940s. The statue has been administered by the City of Portland's Bureau of Parks and Recreation, and later the City of Portland and Multnomah County Public Art Collection courtesy of the Regional Arts & Culture Council. The sculpture has been vandalized multiple times and has been featured in many Portland guides as a feature of Mount Tabor.

== Description ==
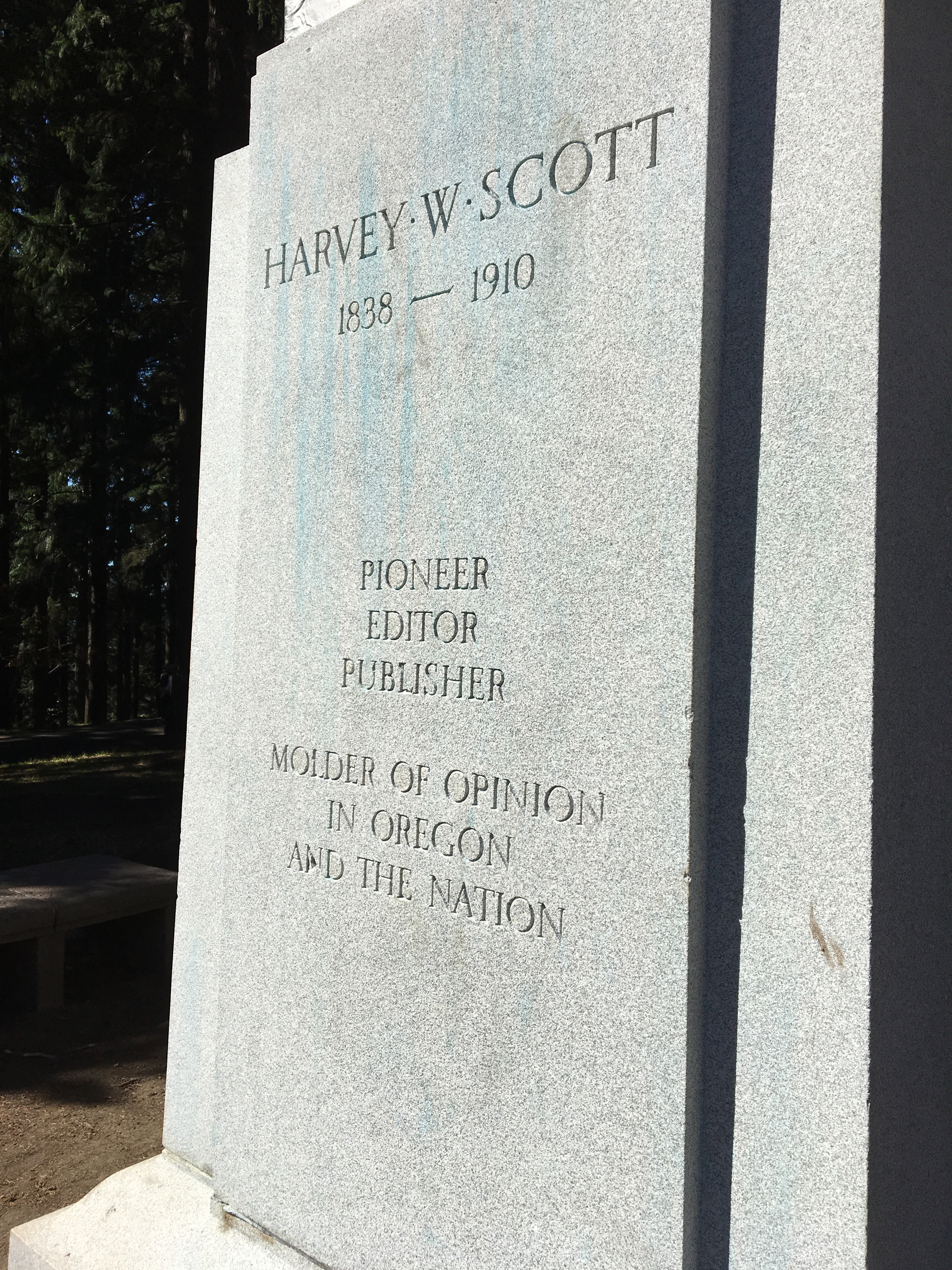
Inscriptions on the base

Gutzon Borglum's two-ton bronze statue depicts a "scowling" Harvey W. Scott (1838–1910), an American pioneer and long-time editor of The Oregonian newspaper, wearing a knee-length coat and pointing his extended right arm westward toward Downtown Portland and the future. The memorial was installed in Mount Tabor Park, a city park on Mount Tabor, a dormant volcano in southeast Portland's eponymous neighborhood.

The statue of Scott was displayed on the summit's southern side and faces southeast, toward Mount Scott; the "towering" statue sat on a basalt terrace with two concrete benches and steps. It measures approximately 132 by 44 by 47 inches (3.4 m × 1.1 m × 1.2 m), and has a granite base measuring approximately 102 by 68 by 73 inches (2.6 m × 1.7 m × 1.9 m). An inscription of the plinth's side edge reads; GUTZON – BORGLUM – SCULPTOR and its back edge bears the inscription; KUNST – FDRY NEW YORK. The front of the base reads: HARVEY W. SCOTT / 1838–1910 / PIONEER / EDITOR / PUBLISHER / MOLDER OF OPINION / IN OREGON / AND THE NATION.

== History ==
The statue of Scott is among Borglum's final works; it was modeled in Borglum's studio in 1930 while he was also working on Mount Rushmore, South Dakota, and sculpted in 1933. It was gifted by Scott's wife Margaret, who left a $20,000 bequest upon her death in 1925, and other family members.

In 1928, a resolution accepting a statue was presented to city council, and Leslie M. Scott confirmed six installation sites were being considered, including Mount Scott Park, the North and South Park Blocks, Terwilliger Boulevard, and Washington Park. On August 31, The Oregonian said Borglum planned to complete and install the work "within a year"; once finished, the design or a model would be inspected by the council, who would help determine an appropriate site. Leslie Scott and Ambrose B. Scott served as executors of the estate, and were tasked with presenting the statue to Portland.

=== Construction and site selection ===
The Scott family selected Borglum to complete the memorial, and the monument's site was chosen by the sculptor and the city's arts commission. Borglum selected the location in 1928 during a visit to Portland with his son Lincoln as guests of Leslie Scott and Colonel A. E. Clark; Borglum believed the city had many suitable sites for the monument and selected Mount Tabor as "... the most poetic, the most beautiful of all". During his visit, he told The Oregonian:

Of course, this country is littered with statues of angels and blindfolded women holding balances aloft, but what of the glorious history of this great nation, the greatest nation ever on earth? Our statues should be of the men who made our history. Scott, out here in Oregon, was one of them.

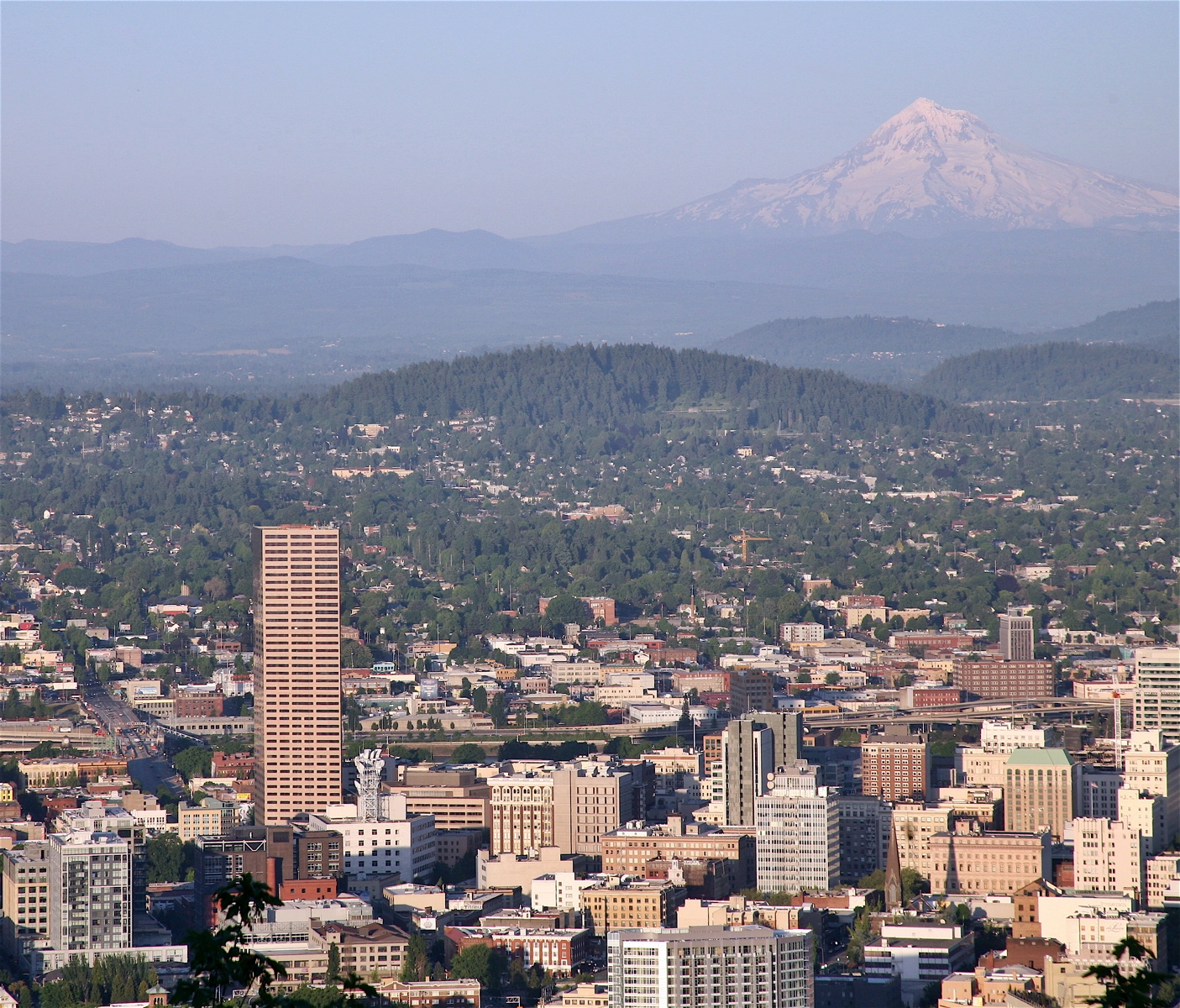
Borglum and Portland's arts commission selected Mount Tabor, a dormant volcano seen here between Downtown Portland and Mount Hood, as the memorial's installation site

The newly-formed arts commission approved the dormant volcano's south slope as the installation site in May 1930. In October, Leslie Scott confirmed the statue would be larger than the original seven-foot (2.1 m) design and The Oregonian reported May 1931 as the planned unveiling date. By then, Borglum had spent three months creating the clay model from which casts in plaster were made, following a series of 30-inch (76 cm) clay models. The molds were shipped to Chicago to be filled with bronze. Borglum was assisted by Ivan Houser, and the sculpture was cast by New York's Kunst Foundry. The Oregonian also described plans for the monument's pedestal and base:

The pedestal of granite will be eight feet high and four feet square and will weigh 20 tons. It will have the general lines of the Doric column, expressing strength; with a slight bulge and with fluting on the corners. The pedestal will have a base slightly larger than its dimensions. The inscription will be placed on the granite block. It has not been selected yet.

When the statue arrived in Portland on April 10, 1931, work on the construction of a temporary wooden base had already started. Several days later, the sculpture was displayed on the wooden structure at Mount Tabor's summit to allow arts commission members to finalize the design for the permanent granite base. The statue's exact placement and orientation were determined in February 1932 by the arts commission, members of Oregon's American Institute of Architects chapter, and Leslie Scott, who spent hours testing options. Two temporary bases were used while final placement decisions were made.

=== Dedication and subsequent maintenance ===
The monument arrived in July 1933 and was dedicated at an "impressive" ceremony that was attended by 3,000 people, including "numerous out-of-town notables". Speakers included Governor Julius Meier, San Francisco Chronicle editor Chester Harvey Rowell, and Joseph Schafer, the superintendent of the Wisconsin Historical Society, who described Scott's impact on the Pacific Northwest. Leslie Scott formally presented the statue, which was unveiled by Scott's granddaughter Elizabeth and received by mayor Joseph K. Carson. Clark served as the program's general chairman and an invocation was delivered by J. Whitcomb Brougher, pastor of Boston's Tremont Temple Baptist church. Also in attendance were members of Scott's family, who in the 1940s created the Scott Statue Memorial Fund with $5,000 to be used for future maintenance.

In 1953, the statue was placed into temporary storage while the original pedestal, which had developed a crack, was replaced with a new bronze one. The work was surveyed and deemed "well maintained" by the Smithsonian Institution's "Save Outdoor Sculpture!" program in 1993, when the statue was administered by the City of Portland's Bureau of Parks and Recreation. The sculpture was later administered by the City of Portland and Multnomah County Public Art Collection courtesy of the Regional Arts & Culture Council (RACC). In 2010, RACC oversaw an $8,000 restoration of the monument that was partly funded by the Oregon Cultural Trust.

=== Vandalism and replacement ===
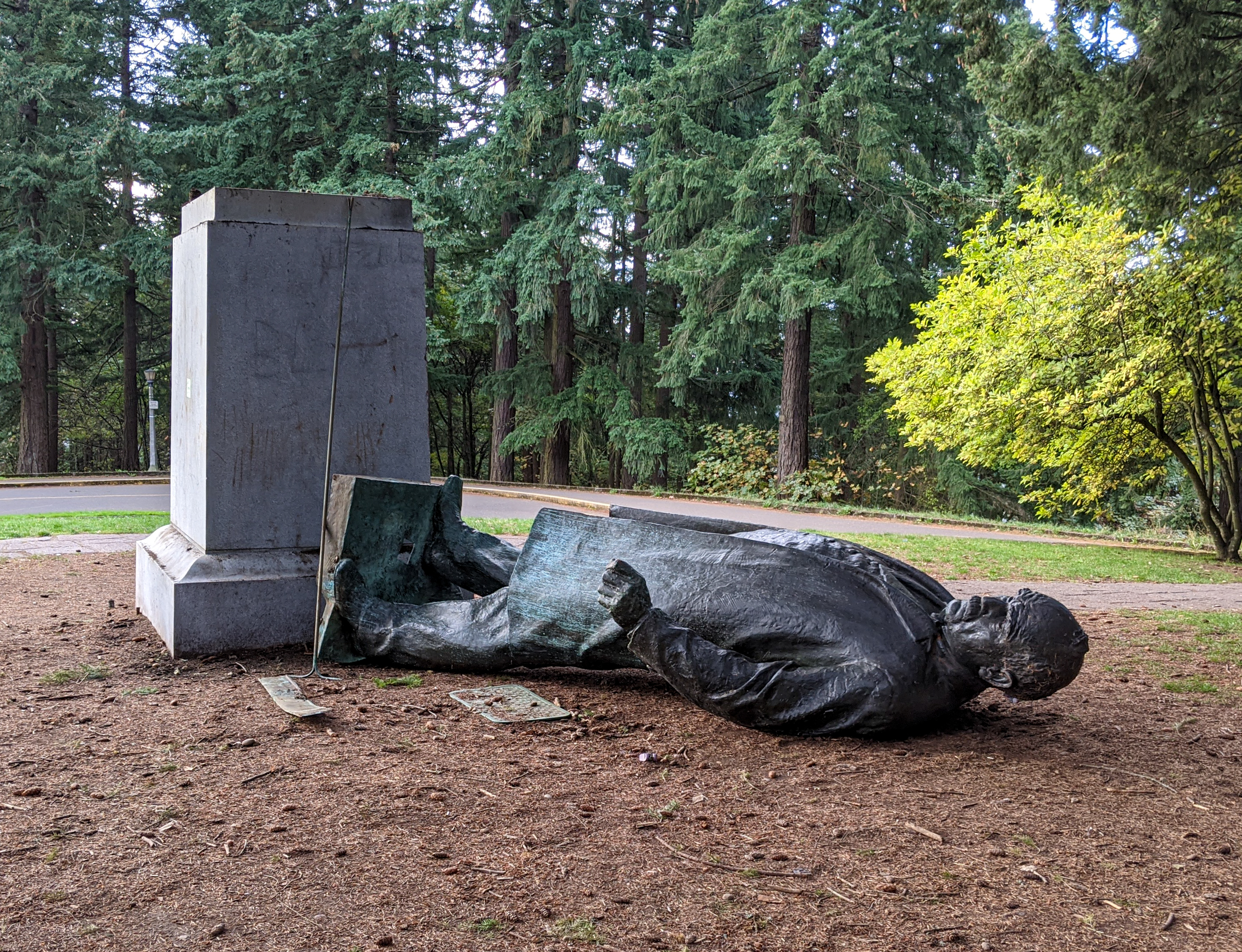
The statue, toppled in October 2020

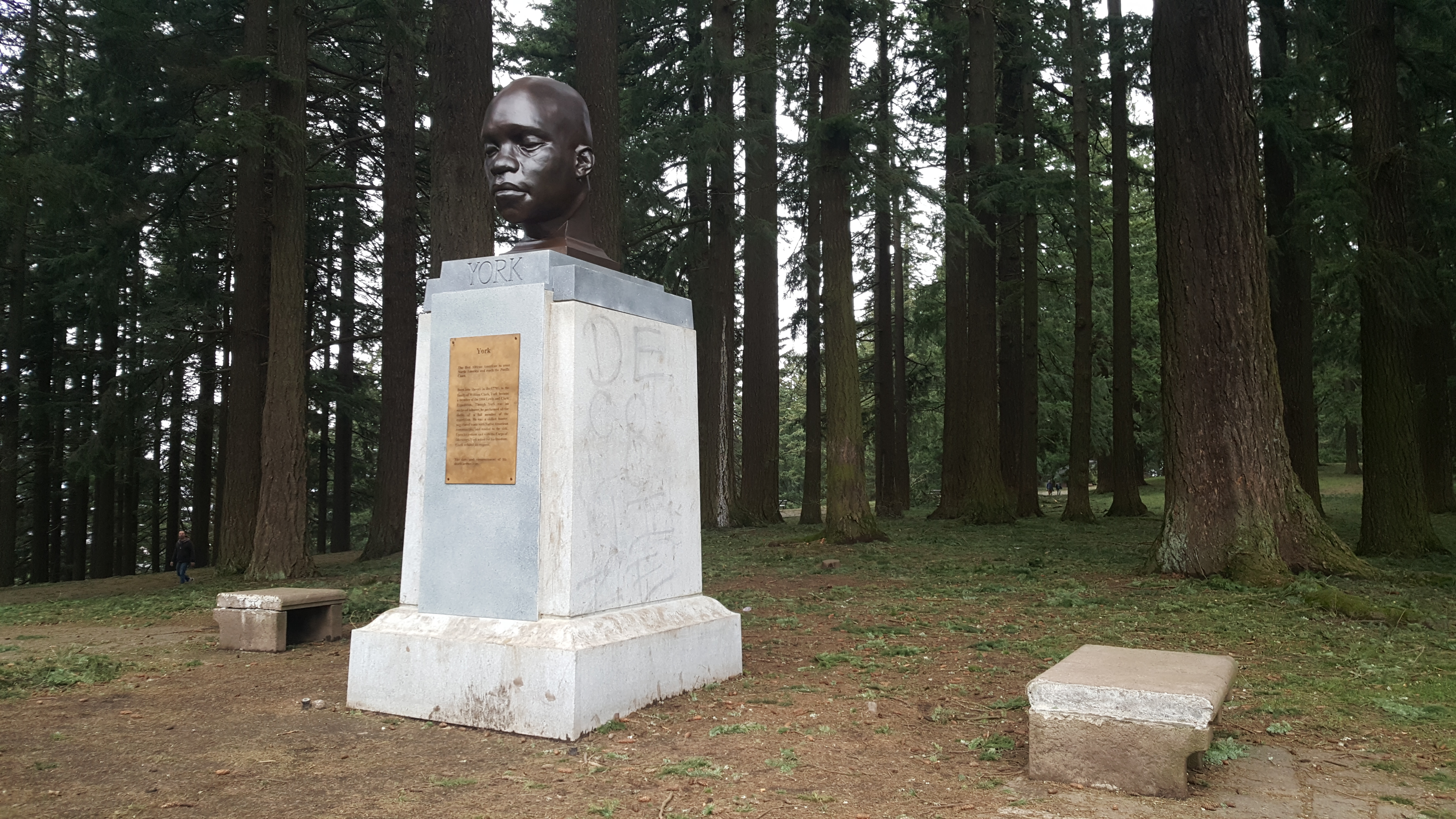
Bust of York, February 2021

The statue was vandalized in May 2019 and graffiti removal was required. In November the same year, the artwork was again vandalized by an unknown perpetrator, who wrote "No Thanks Land" and "Chinook Land" in red paint.

The statue was toppled in October 2020, following a series of statue removals in Portland during the George Floyd protests. Earlier in the year, demonstrators toppled statues of Thomas Jefferson and George Washington, and the statue of Abraham Lincoln and Theodore Roosevelt, Rough Rider were toppled during the Indigenous Peoples Day of Rage (October 11).

In February 2021, a bust of York by an unknown artist appeared on the pedestal. He was depicted as bald and a plaque read, "The first African American to cross North America and reach the Pacific Coast". Parks commissioner Carmen Rubio said, "We should regard this installation for both the important piece that it is, as well as a much-needed reminder to city leaders to hasten our work of rooting out white supremacy in our institutions—particularly our city government, where many processes exclude community participation and discourage engagement." As of February 20, the city planned to keep the bust on display, according to Rubio, to "ensure our city policies regarding monuments, recognitions, and parks-affiliated names reflect our commitment to a fuller, more racially inclusive history of contributions to Portland". Adena Long, director of Portland Parks & Recreation, said the installation was a "complete surprise" to the bureau and she looked forward to seeing it in person. The bust was toppled in July 2021.

In 2024, the city announced plans to deaccession the statue from the city's collection. It will be replaced by a permanent sculpture of York.

== Reception ==
In 1931, The Oregonian said Scott is depicted with a "powerful pose, symbolizing the idea of the man of vision", and Leslie Scott was quoted as saying, "Borglum has done a fine piece of modeling, and I think our people here will value it both as a work of art and as a good standing portrait". The newspaper's Janet Moore described the statue as "heroic" in 1951 and wrote, "Portland is fortunate to possess this excellent specimen of Borglum's work".

In 1965, John Painter Jr. of The Oregonian called the statue "dramatic" and said most Portland residents were unfamiliar with the "dilemma" over the artwork's installation site. In his "fascinating history of 25 Portland public-art gems" (2017), the newspaper's Douglas Perry said the sculpture "is further proof that Borglum liked to think big", with Scott "[having] the stance and look of a radical politician".

The statue has been included in published walking, hiking, biking, and other exploratory guides of Portland, as well as road trips of the Pacific Northwest, as a feature of Mount Tabor.

== See also ==
- 1933 in art
- List of monuments and memorials removed during the George Floyd protests
- List of public art in Portland, Oregon
