= Thomas Scott House =

Thomas Scott House may refer to:

- Thomas Scott House (Gloster, Louisiana), listed on the NRHP in Louisiana
- Thomas Scott House (Greensboro, North Carolina), listed on the NRHP in North Carolina
- Thomas Scott House (Coatesville, Pennsylvania), listed on the NRHP in Pennsylvania

== See also ==
- Scott House (disambiguation)
