= Leslie M. Scott House =

Historic building in Portland, Oregon, U.S.

- U.S. National Register of Historic Places
- Portland Historic Landmark
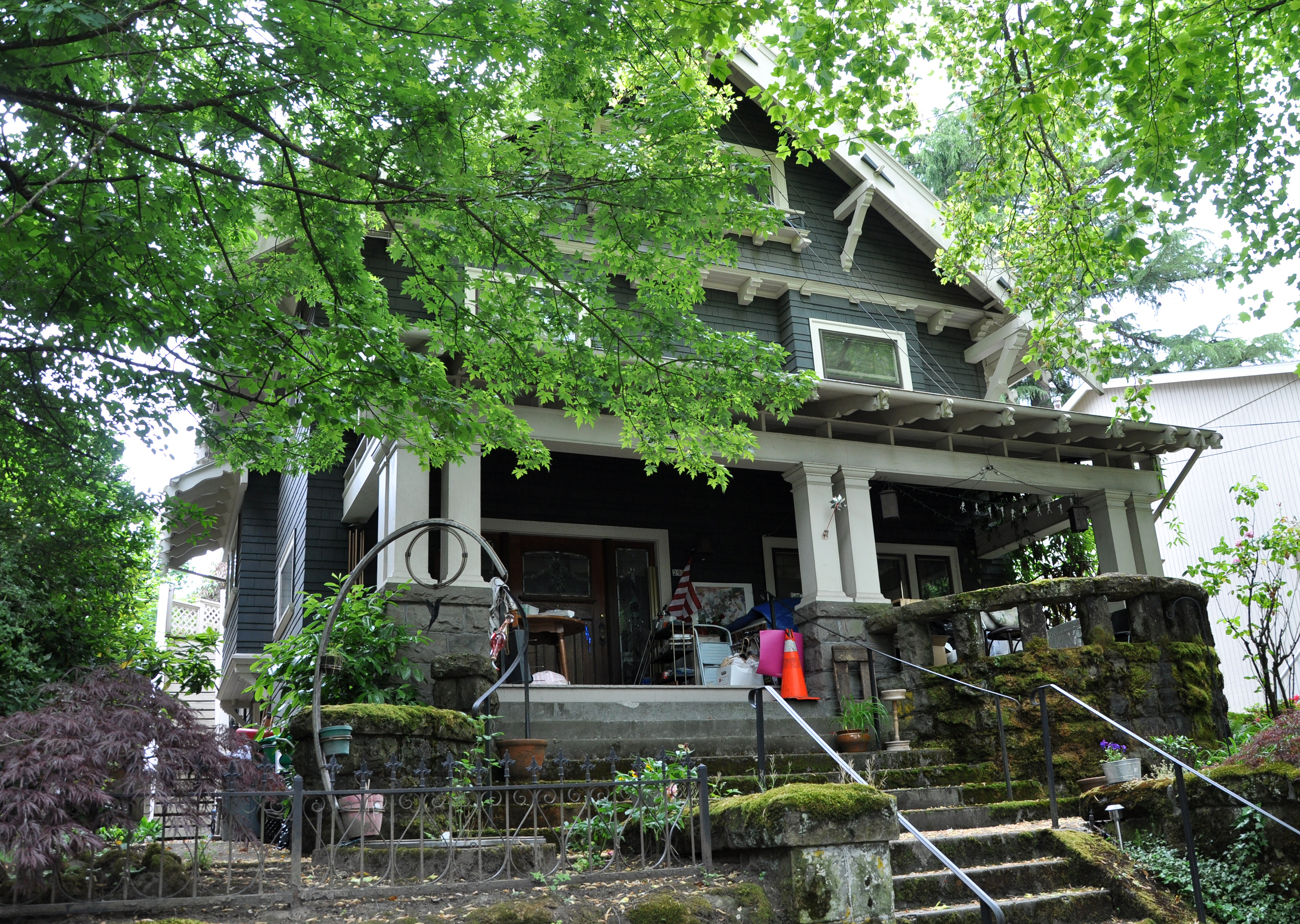
- The house's exterior in 2011
- Location: 2936 SE Taylor Street; Portland, Oregon
- Coordinates: 45°30′53″N 122°38′07″W
- Built: 1910
- Architectural style: Bungalow/Craftsman
- MPS: Portland Eastside MPS
- NRHP reference No.: 89000104
- Added to NRHP: March 8, 1989

The Leslie M. Scott House in southeast Portland in the U.S. state of Oregon is a 2.5-storey dwelling listed on the National Register of Historic Places. A bungalow built in American Craftsman style in 1910, it was added to the register in 1989.

The house, resting on a concrete foundation, has a full basement and is covered by a gable roof with gabled dormers. Arthur Arand, a local contractor who built the house, used natural materials throughout. Bays and other projections extend from the structure's flat exterior planes on every level. Other notable features include a full-width stone porch with a semi-circular projection on one side, bargeboards, decorative rafter ends, a large stone fireplace in the living room, and stained-glass interior doors in the study and master bedroom.

Leslie M. Scott, the son of Harvey W. Scott, an influential editor of The Oregonian newspaper, was in his own right a well-known public figure. A writer and editor, he was a long-time vice president of The Oregonian. He was a member of the Oregon Historical Society board of directors from 1913 to 1956 and served as Oregon State Treasurer from 1940 to 1949. While living in the house, he began compiling and editing his father's editorials, published in 1917 as a two-volume work entitled History of the Oregon Country. Scott lived in the house for about nine years before moving to the Coleman–Scott House in northeast Portland.

== See also ==
- National Register of Historic Places listings in Southeast Portland, Oregon
