= Ku Klux Klan in Oregon =

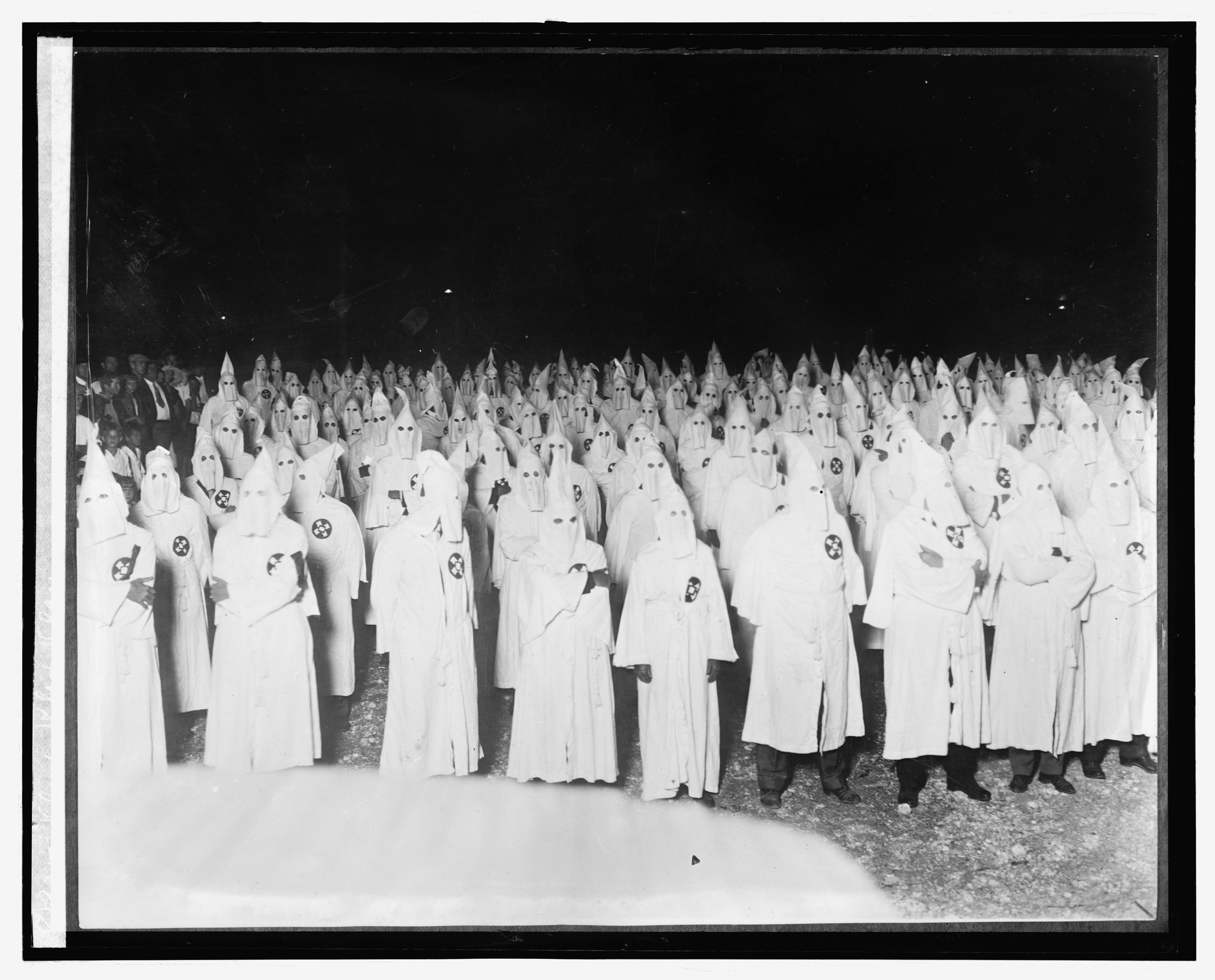
A group of Klansmen gathered in their robes and hoods

The Ku Klux Klan (KKK) arrived in the U.S. state of Oregon in the early 1920s, during the history of the second Klan, and it quickly spread throughout the state, aided by a mostly white, Protestant population as well as by racist and anti-immigrant sentiments which were already embedded in the region. The Klan succeeded in electing its members in local and state governments, which allowed it to pass legislation that furthered its agenda. Ultimately, the struggles and decline of the Klan in Oregon coincided with the struggles and decline of the Klan in other states, and its activity faded in the 1930s.

== Background ==
=== Racism in Oregon ===
Starting when it was still a territory, Oregon had several laws which prohibited both enslaved and free African Americans from living in the state. The first, passed in 1843, outlawed slavery except as punishment for a crime. It was amended in 1844 to limit how much time slave owners had to move their slaves out of the state before they would be freed by the state; free Blacks were not allowed to remain in the state, with a proposed punishment for staying in the state being a lashing (with this provision being repealed before it was enforced). In 1848, a law was passed barring African Americans from migrating into Oregon, but allowed those already residing in the state to stay; this law was overturned in 1854.

The growth of the Democrat supported pro-slavery movement in the southwest quarter of the Oregon Territory was greatly influenced by the California Gold Rush. Oregonians and Southerners traveled in large numbers to the California gold mines during the 1850s. Wealthy Southerners brought slaves with them or captured local African Americans, Chinese, and Native Americans to work the mines - introducing Oregon miners to the advantages of slave labor.

Many returning Oregon miners and Southern miners, relocating to the territory, brought the pro-slavery movement with them or a fear of cheap slave labor competition. Strong support from pro-slavery newspapers, backed by the National Democratic Party, helped influence many more territorial residents - especially residents living between the central Willamette Valley and the Southern border. However, few Oregonians had the resources to participate in slavery. Many believed slave-owning farmers, settling in Oregon, would out-compete their own small, independent farms.

When Oregon was admitted into the Union in 1859, its constitution contained an exclusion law prohibiting Blacks from living in the state, owning property, or entering into contracts. The passage of the 14th Amendment in 1868 effectively overrode this law, but it was not officially repealed until 1926.

== Operations ==
=== Ku Klux Klan's expansion into Oregon ===
With similar views of racism, white supremacy and anti-Catholic, anti-Semitic, and anti-immigrant stances, it was easy for the Klan to move into Oregon. The first member of the Ku Klux Klan was sworn in by Major Luther I. Powell in 1921 in Medford. During the same time, other members of the Klan were at work searching for new recruits across the state to add to their numbers and organize local chapters and klaverns.

==== Eugene ====
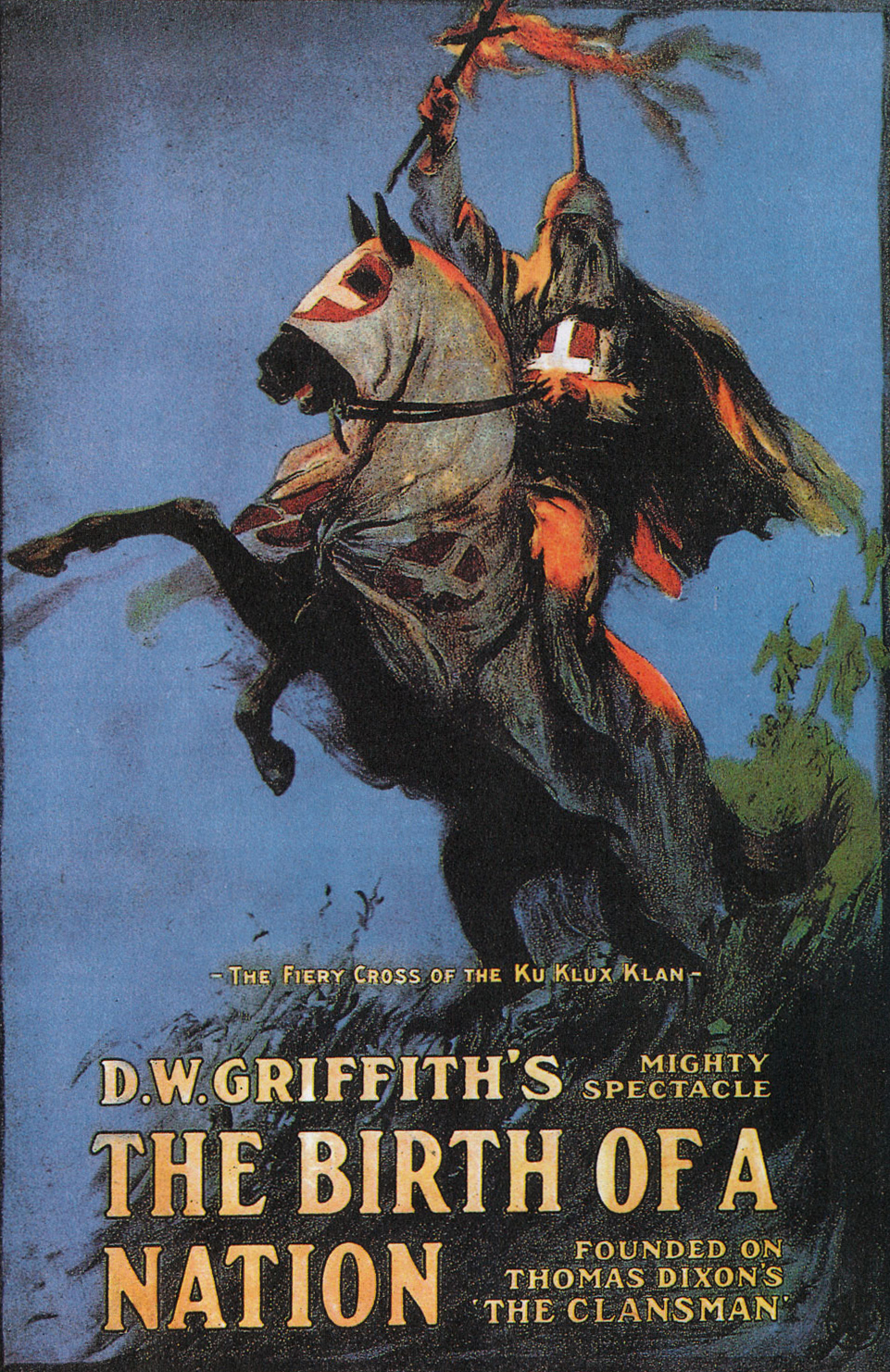
Poster for the film Birth of a Nation

Early recruitment in Eugene was led by Powell, with help from local members and other associates of Powell, who would speak to the public alongside showings of the D. W. Griffith film The Birth of a Nation. In tandem with a religious revival in the area, they appealed to residents' concern for keeping foreign influences out as well as their desires for patriotism and morality.

There were already over 80 members when a local newspaper wrote about the Klan arriving in town, and shortly thereafter the group would be formally organized under Exalted Cyclops Frederic Stanley Dunn, who was employed at the University of Oregon as department head of Latin studies. Members of Eugene Klan No. 3 quickly became involved in local politics, voicing not only moral stances against alcohol and prostitution, but anti-Catholic views as well, that resulted, directly and indirectly, in the ouster of several teachers and local leaders, which also coincided with the sudden resignation of Mayor Charles O. Peterson, Chief of Police Chris Christensen, and City Attorney Orla H. Foster. Additionally, many candidates endorsed by the Eugene Klan obtained local office in the fall of 1922.

Efforts to include the University of Oregon in their sphere of influence did not succeed, due to opposition from students, graduates, and faculty and administration, though this did not mean that there was no Klan presence on campus. The Klan was able to keep speakers and activities contrary to their values to a minimum; several members had business ties to campus life, a few were alumni, a few more faculty and students. Even the football graduate manager Jack Benefiel and coach, C. A. "Shy" Huntington were Klansmen.

When the state legislature passed the Compulsory Education Act in 1922, the Klan's presence put Lane County among the 14 counties in the state where voters were in support of the measure.

In March 1924, the Klan joined forces with the local post of the American Legion (which at the time was led by Klansman George Love) to oppose Peter Vasillevich Verigin announcing that he would send around 10,000 of his Doukhobor followers from British Columbia to settle in the Willamette Valley. Ultimately, after a rally against the Doukhobor in Junction City in August, not much else would be done due to the murder of Verigin and very few Doukhobors actually moving, and their eventual return to Canada.

One of the last notable activities of Eugene Klan No. 3 was June 27, 1924, at the Lane County Fairgrounds. They held a parade through downtown, with participants and spectators from all over Oregon and from various Klan-related organizations, joined also by the city band and another local organization's band. There were fireworks and a burning cross above them on Skinner Butte, and they gathered afterward at the fairgrounds for an initiation ceremony, lit by cross covered in red lights instead of fire.

Eventually, after the resignation of Fred L. Gifford from his post as Grand Dragon, in addition to national issues within the Klan, Klan No. 3 died out in the 1930s, although the exact time is not clear.

==== Tillamook ====
In 1922-1925, the Ku Klux Klan saw unlikely growth in Tillamook County, on the Northern Oregon Coast. Soon after the rise of the Klan's presence in Portland, the Klan was established in Tillamook, where it was quite successful. The Klan also offered recognition of many native-born Protestants who were not previously accepted in their society. The Klan was originally drawn to Tillamook because of the lack of external opposition and threats. While no Klansmen were directly involved with local political occupations, becoming allied with the Klan was essential for any politician to succeed and get re-elected.

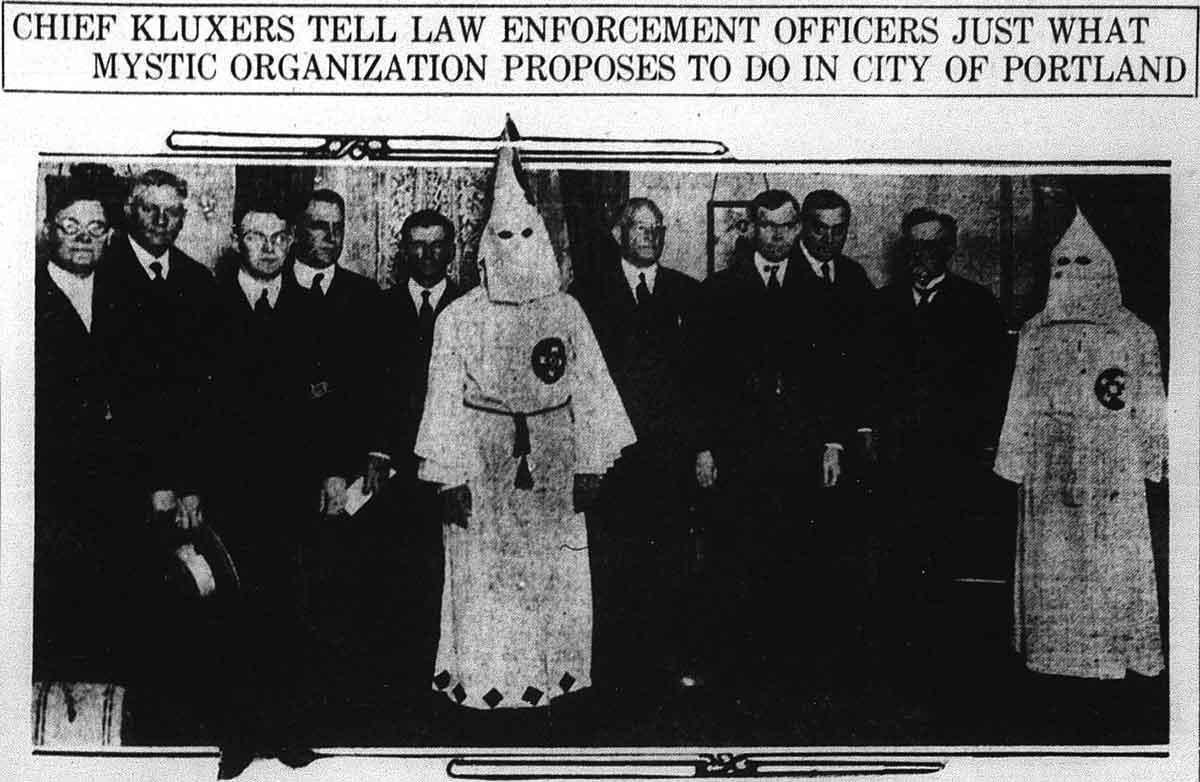
Infamous newspaper photo of Klan members meeting with Portland's law enforcement and political leadership in August, 1921

==== Portland ====
The Ku Klux Klan's development and growth across America was widely known as the "Middle-Class Movement". Initial growth in Portland, was fundamentally founded on this principle. The traditions of the middle class, as well as their populist beliefs, complimented the Black exclusion laws that existed in the mid-1800s. In addition, there were anti-Chinese and anti-Japanese sentiments present because of the large populations of such groups in Portland and the surrounding areas. Portland was not fully made up of middle-class citizens, however, and its political activity was often anti-populist. The Klan had a very deep and complex presence in Portland, and no membership records of Klan members in the early 1900s are known to exist. During February and April, 1922, over two thousand members were inducted into the Klan; Oregon was estimated to contain more than 50,000 members, with 60% of Klansmen living in Portland. Portland Klan members came from a variety of backgrounds including doctors, lawyers, businessmen, clerks, and many other professions. Initiations of new Klansmen were held on Mount Scott and many cross burnings occurred on Mount Tabor.

In 1924, the bidding process for the replacement of the Burnside Bridge ended with a suspicious winning bid; the public would later learn that the 1924 contract was given for $500,000 more than the lowest bid. Having moved the bridge location to profit by selling their land, three Multnomah County commissioners were recalled as a result of the scandal, and a new engineering company assumed control of the project. The Klan had backed the commissioners and enabled their system of kickbacks and grafts; the ensuing "rotten bridge scandal" removed much of the Klan's clout, even by 1924.

== Policies ==
=== Black Exclusion Laws ===
In the 1840s and 1850s, white residents of Oregon generally did not support slavery, however, they also did not want to live alongside African Americans. The first Black exclusion law was the result of the Organic Laws of Oregon, established in the Oregon Country in 1843 by the Provisional Government of Oregon. They included an article banning slavery in Oregon except for use as punishment, although the means of enforcement was left unclear. The Organic Laws were amended in 1844, reiterating the prohibition of slavery in Oregon, and forcing slave owners to remove slaves from the state. Once in effect, freed male slaves could not stay in Oregon for more than two years, and a female slave could not stay longer than three years. Any free African American who refused to leave would be subject to lashings and beatings. These punishments were prohibited in 1845.

The Oregon Territorial Legislature enacted the second Black exclusion law on September 21, 1849. This law specified that "it shall not be lawful for any negro or mulatto to enter into, or reside" in Oregon. This law targeted African American seamen who could be tempted to jump overboard and swim to the coast to escape. Lawmakers were concerned that Blacks would "intermix with Indians, instilling into their minds feelings of hostility toward the white race". The second exclusion act was later rescinded in 1854.

In 1857, the Oregon Constitution was ratified, and sections of Article XVIII went into effect. The article contained provisions for putting the questions of slavery and free Blacks to a vote of the people. The slavery amendment failed, but the exclusion law passed.

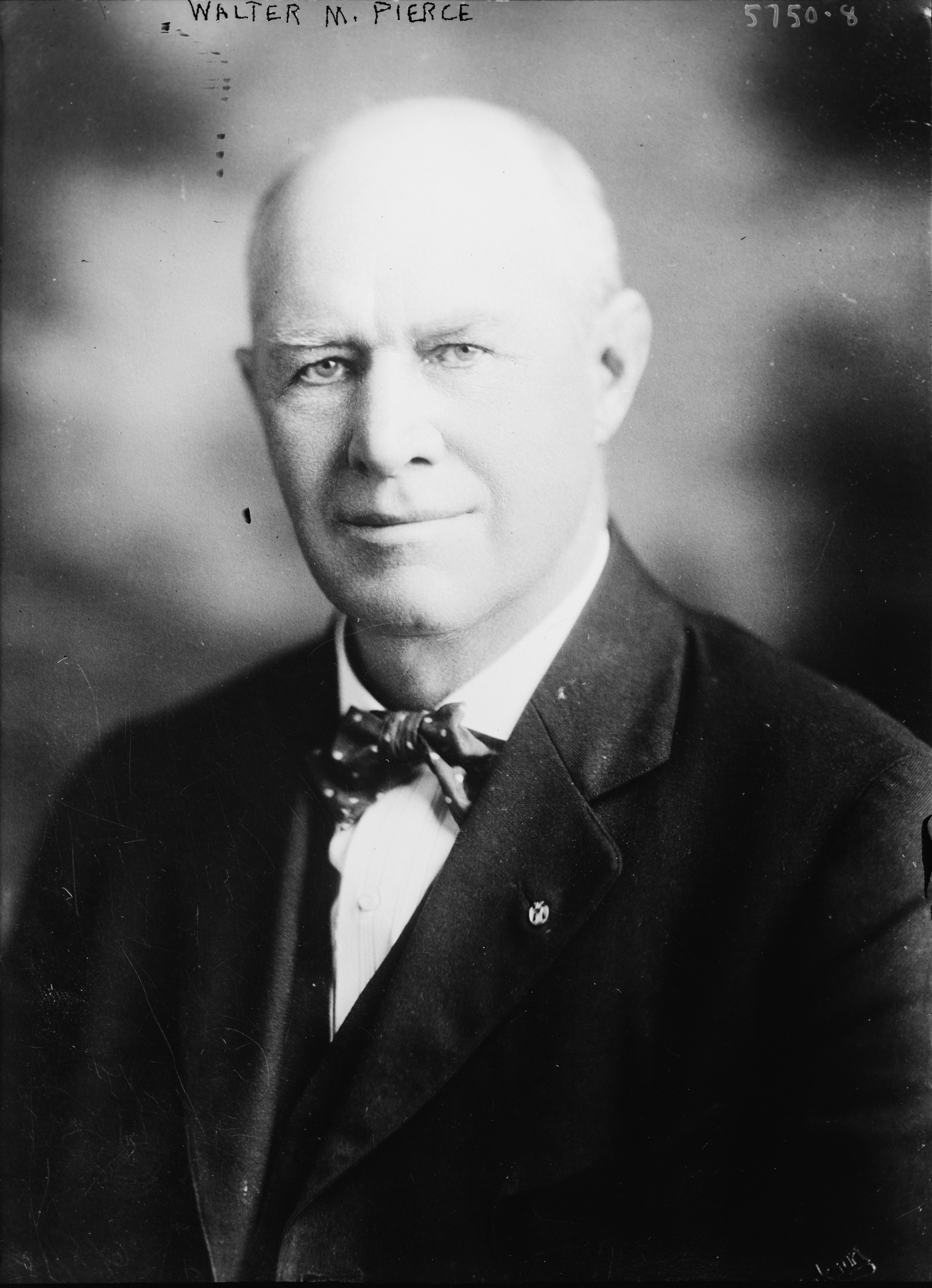
Walter M. Pierce

== Notable figures ==
=== Walter M. Pierce ===
Walter M. Pierce was an Oregon politician from 1886 to 1942. During those years, he served in elected offices such as county recorder, state legislator, governor, and U.S. congressman. Pierce was an active participant in social movements such as populism and progressivism. Eventually, Pierce was elected to the Oregon State Senate, placing him at the forefront of these social and political reforms. His views on social reform mirrored those views which were held by members of the middle class, and at the time, the Klan's values mirrored the contradictory social and political values which were held by members of the middle class. Pierce was a supporter of radical populism and democratic populism, which led to his eventual support of and partnership with the Ku Klux Klan. After an unsuccessful run in 1918, Pierce was elected Governor of Oregon in 1922, while the political power of the Ku Klux Klan simultaneously emerged in Oregon. The Klan supported Pierce during his campaign for governor and was in close communication with Pierce as he was in office. After his retirement from political office in Oregon, Pierce would go on to be elected to Congress in 1932.
