= Mount Tabor (Oregon) =

Extinct volcanic vent and park in Portland, Oregon, U.S.

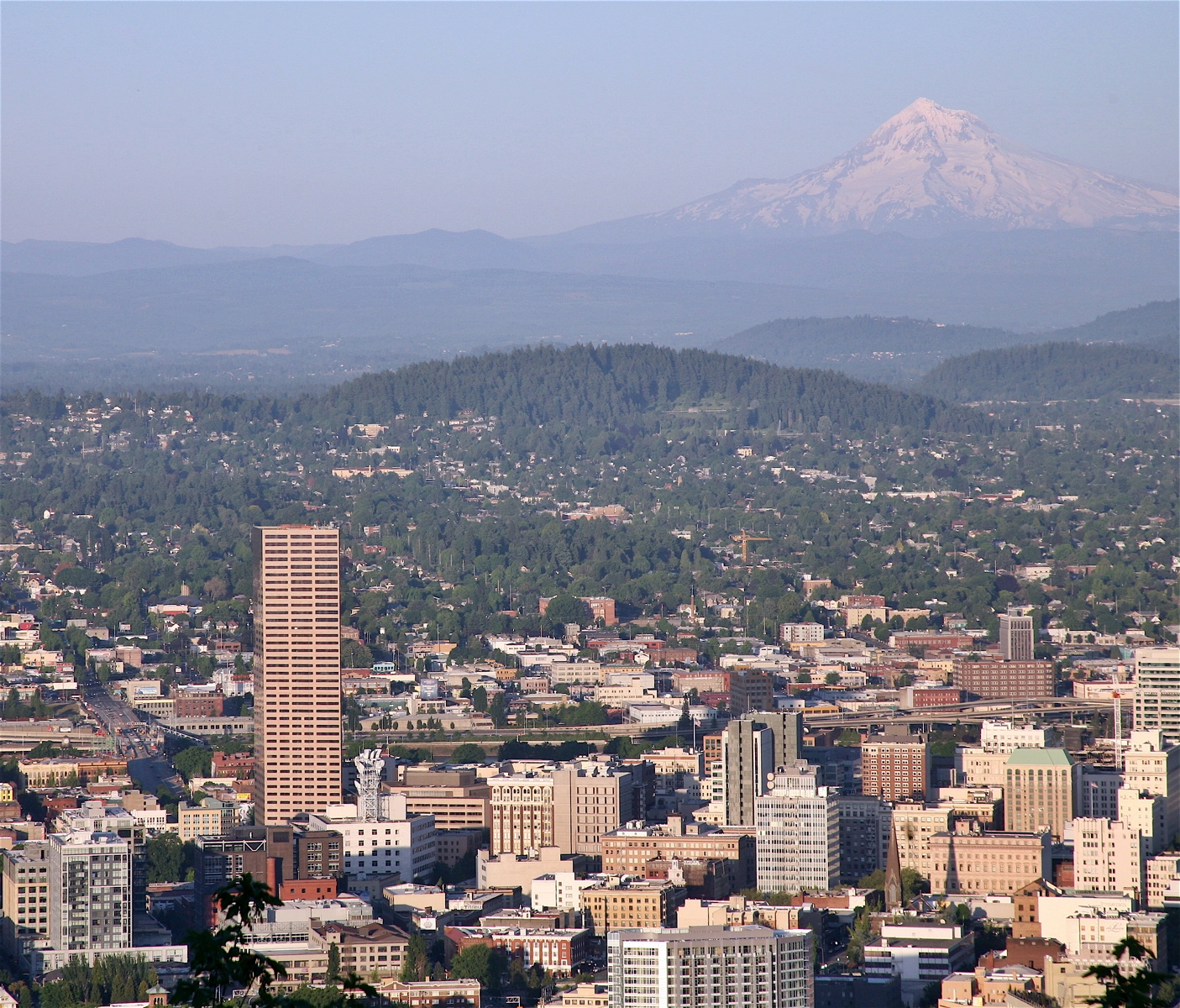
Downtown Portland, with Mount Tabor (center) and Mount Hood in the distance

Mount Tabor is an extinct volcanic vent with a city park on the volcano, located in Portland, Oregon's neighborhood of the same name. The name refers to Mount Tabor, Israel. It was named by Plympton Kelly, son of Oregon City pioneer resident Clinton Kelly.

== History ==
The Chinook people lived on the land around Mount Tabor before American settlers moved in. A massive fire erupted in 1846 east of what is now the Lents area and spread up to the Columbia River, which allowed them to settle on the land. The mountain was named by Plympton Kelly, the son of 1800's pioneer Clinton Kelly upon the construction of a schoolhouse nearby. He had contested the name Mount Zion proposed by his father, and suggested taking the name of Mount Tabor in Palestine (what is now Israel) based on a book he read about The 1799 Battle of Mount Tabor in Napoleon's conquests. After the establishment of Mount Tabor, more settlers moved into the area, forming a community with its own post office and judicial district. On March 5th, 1886, 50 masked men went with guns to round up over 100 Chinese workers on the mountain and had forcefully deported them via boat.

The development of railroads between Mount Tabor and the city center began in 1889 and led to many more people building homes on the mountain, increasing to 200 homes at the time.

== Cinder cone ==
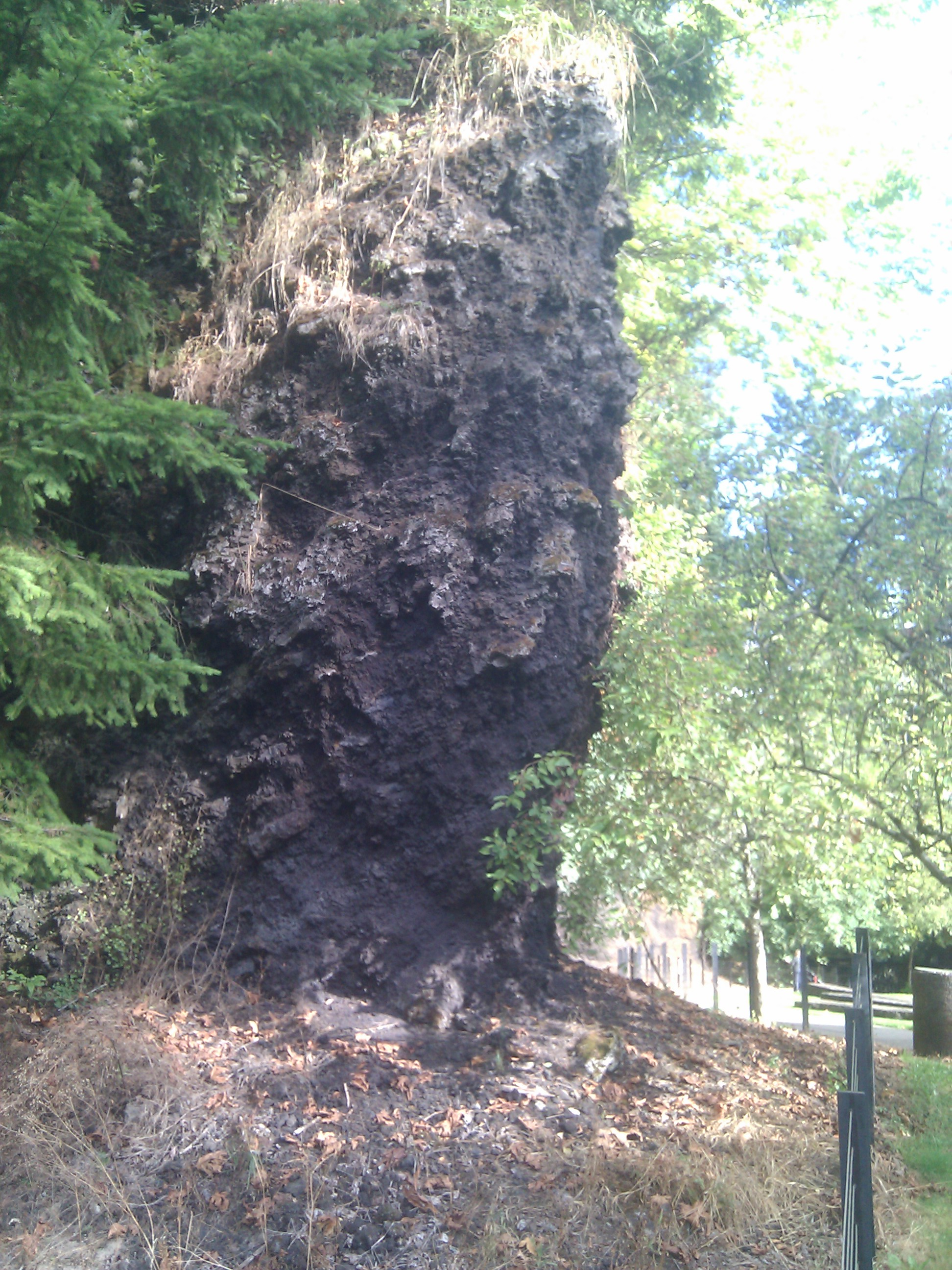
Cinder cone cut-away

The peak of Mount Tabor is at 636 feet (194 m) in elevation; about two-thirds of this is prominence since the surrounding land is at about 200 feet (61 m) in elevation.

Near the peak, where a basketball court and outdoor amphitheater are now situated, part of the cinder cone has been cut away, and the rock is visible to park visitors. The remaining cinders were used to pave the nearby parking lot.

The Tabor cinder cone is part of the Boring Lava Field, an extensive network of cinder cones and small shield volcanoes ranging from Boring, Oregon, to southwest Washington, and dating to the Plio-Pleistocene era. The lava field has been extinct for over 300,000 years. Three other cinder cones from this field also lie within the city of Portland: Rocky Butte, Powell Butte, and Kelly Butte.

Portland is one of six cities in the United States to have an extinct volcano (Mount Tabor) within its boundaries. Bend is the only other city in Oregon with a volcano within its city limits, with Pilot Butte. Jackson Volcano in Jackson, Mississippi, Diamond Head in Honolulu, Glassford Hill in Prescott Valley, Arizona and Pilot Knob in Austin, Texas being the others.

The volcanic nature of Mount Tabor became known in 1913, when a road-building crew discovered traces of volcanic cinders in the park.

== Park ==
- Mount Tabor Park
- U.S. National Register of Historic Places
- U.S. Historic district
- Portland Historic Landmark
- Location within Portland, Oregon
- Location: Roughly bounded by SE Division Street, SE 60th Avenue, SE Yamhill Street, and SE Mountainview Drive, Portland, Oregon
- Coordinates: 45°30′43″N 122°35′39″W
- Built: 1903
- Architects: Emanuel Tillman Mische, Charles P. Keyser
- Architectural style: Late Victorian, Late 19th, and 20th Century Revivals
- NRHP reference No.: 04001065
- Added to NRHP: September 22, 2004

- Mount Tabor Park Reservoirs; Historic District
- U.S. National Register of Historic Places
- U.S. Historic district
- U.S. Historic district – Contributing property
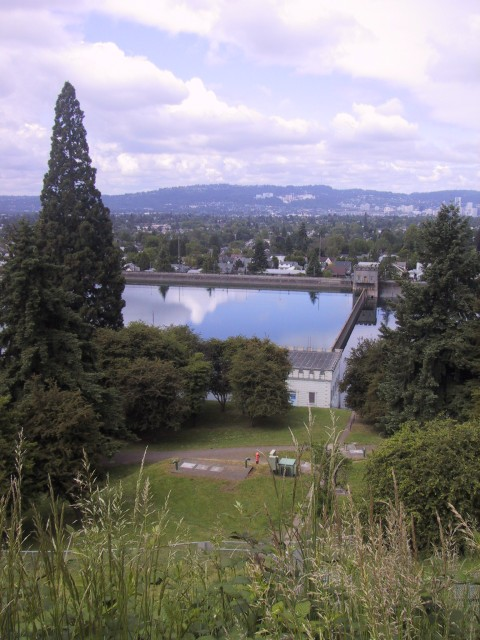
- Reservoir #6 in 2006
- Location: 1900 SE Reservoir Loop; Portland, Oregon
- Coordinates: 45°30′40″N 122°35′47″W
- Area: 176.04 acres (71.24 ha)
- Built: 1894
- Architects: Isaac Smith, et al.
- Architectural style: Romanesque
- Part of: Mount Tabor Park (ID04001065)
- NRHP reference No.: 03001446
- Added to NRHP: January 15, 2004

The land making up the Mount Tabor volcanic butte was identified as a site for reservoirs in the 1880s due to its ideal elevation for a water distribution system. The Mount Tabor reservoirs were built during the period of 1894 and 1911, along with reservoirs in Washington Park. City fathers formed a water committee and created a municipal water system piping water some 25 miles from the Bull Run River watershed, separate and west of Mount Hood, to Mount Tabor reservoirs and across the Willamette River to City Park (now Washington Park) reservoirs in 1894. The Bull Run watershed was among the first federal lands to be set aside in the Forest Reserve Act of 1891 and enacted by president Benjamin Harrison.

The reservoirs and their gatehouses are artistically constructed, incorporating extensive reinforced concrete, designed to look like stonework, by two early patented techniques by noted engineer Ernest L. Ransome and wrought-iron fencing and lampposts designed by architect William M. Whidden. There were initially four above-ground reservoirs, numbered 1, 2, 5, and 6. (Reservoirs 3 and 4 are at Washington Park, and Reservoir 7 is a small underground reservoir near Mount Tabor's summit.) Reservoir 2, on the corner of SE 60th and Division, was decommissioned in the 1980s, and the property was sold to a private developer. Its gatehouse remains, and is used as a private residence. Reservoir 6 is the largest, with two 37 million gallon chambers; it also contains a fountain, which was unused for many years; however, it was reactivated in early 2007. Three of the reservoirs were accepted to the National Register of Historic Places in January 2004. The reservoirs' nomination was also a community effort spearheaded by the Friends of the Reservoirs and funded by donations.

John Charles Olmsted, stepson and nephew of the famed Frederick Law Olmsted, visited Portland in 1903 to help design the site for the Lewis and Clark Centennial Exposition, on the request of Rev. Thomas Lamb Eliot, minister of the First Unitarian Church and relative of Charles Eliot, the son of the president of Harvard University and acclaimed landscape architect and partner in the Olmsted landscape firm in Brookline, Massachusetts. Rev. Eliot arranged for Olmsted to visit Seattle for park planning, too, in order to help make the long trip financially feasible. While John Charles Olmsted was in Portland, Rev. Eliot and other park supporters took him on a tour throughout the city so that he could create a grand plan of parks. Olmsted recommended that Mount Tabor be protected for future park use, even though it was well removed from the city at the time. Following Olmsted's recommendation, the Portland Parks Bureau began to acquire land there in 1909. The park was designed, along with other Portland parks, by Emanuel Tillman Mische, a highly pedigreed horticulturist and long-time landscape designer for the famed Olmsted Brothers landscape firm. The 196-acre (0.79 km^{2}) Mount Tabor Park was the largest Portland park until 1947 when Forest Park was created.

Mount Tabor Park does not appear to have ever been formally ordained by the city as a park. According to archival records, an ordinance declaring Williams Park, named for a prominent citizen, was stopped by neighborhood activists wanting the historic name, Mount Tabor Park, to be retained. No other ordinance appears to have been enacted to date. The entire park, including the Central Maintenance Yard, was listed in the National Register of Historic Places in 2004. The nomination was forwarded by a community effort spearheaded and funded by the Mount Tabor Neighborhood Association.

Mount Tabor was home to cross burnings by Oregon's Ku Klux Klan in the 1920s. Automotive parades of hooded Klan members were common in Southeast Portland.

The park featured a statue of The Oregonian editor and Scottish Rite Freemason Harvey W. Scott. The larger-than-life statue was sculpted by Gutzon Borglum, notable for sculptures on Mount Rushmore. The bronze statue was dedicated on July 22, 1933, with approximately 3,000 in attendance, 23 years after Scott died. Oregon governor Julius Meier was chairman of the event, and Chester Harvey Rowell gave a speech. The statue was toppled in 2020 and replaced with the bust of York in February 2021.

In 2023, Mount Tabor Park was designated as the first Urban Quiet Park in the United States by Quiet Parks International, an organization that seeks to promote quiet parks around the world.

== Reservoir controversy ==
The Mount Tabor Reservoirs, along with those in Portland's Washington Park, have been the subject of a decade-long controversy surrounding lucrative engineering contracts to replace the historic open reservoirs with underground storage tanks. Concern has been raised about the possible relationship between City officials and the engineering firms receiving the no-bid reservoir decommissioning contracts; and about the role these parties may have played in lobbying for pro-underground-tank modifications (the "LT2" rule) to the Safe Drinking Water Act.

On June 15, 2011, a man was observed urinating in a nearly 8-million-gallon reservoir, prompting city officials to drain the water at a cost of around $36,000.

Under LT2, several hundred of the country's historic open reservoirs were decommissioned, including the three open air reservoirs on Mount Tabor, which no longer provide drinking water.

Following pressure from other open-reservoir cities, in 2011 the EPA softened its stance on the LT2 rule and allowed the country's remaining open reservoirs to halt burial plans; but despite public outcry Mount Tabor's open reservoirs remain slated for decommissioning. In August 2015, the Portland City Council voted for decommissioning, considered to be the final vote on the issue.

== Park access ==
Mount Tabor Park can be entered by vehicle from 69th Avenue and Yamhill Street on the north side of the volcano, Harrison Street on the east, Lincoln Street on the southwest, and 60th Avenue and Salmon Street on the northwest side. An off-leash dog park is located on the south side near the Harrison entrance. There is also pedestrian access from several dead-end streets on the south side off 72nd Avenue. A bike path and multiuse path provides park access beginning at SE 64th Avenue and Division Street. The bike path construction was completed in 2024.

=== Hiking ===
Mount Tabor has numerous paths and can be climbed from virtually any direction. Three official trails begin and end at the kiosk in the parking lot just west of the park entrance at 69th and Yamhill. The easy 1-mile (1.6 km) Red Trail, the intermediate 1.7-mile (2.7 km) Green Trail and the more difficult 3-mile (4.8 km) Blue Trail all circle the volcano by way of gravel paths and paved roads. The Blue Trail includes the 96-step stairway between Reservoirs 5 and 6, and has an optional 0.31-mile (0.5 km) loop around the summit. Bicycles are permitted on the Red and Blue Trails. Leashed dogs are permitted on all the trails. Restrooms are available at the summit and the visitors center near the 60th and Salmon entrance.

== Visitors' center ==
In October 2011, the Friends of Mount Tabor Park opened a visitors' center in a former storage room at the park.

== Reception ==
The park placed second in the Best Park category of Willamette Week's annual 'Best of Portland' readers' poll in 2025.

== See also ==
- Chauncey Hosford, an early owner of the property at the summit of Mount Tabor
- Hawthorne, Portland, Oregon
