= Bust of York =

Sculpture in Portland, Oregon, U.S.

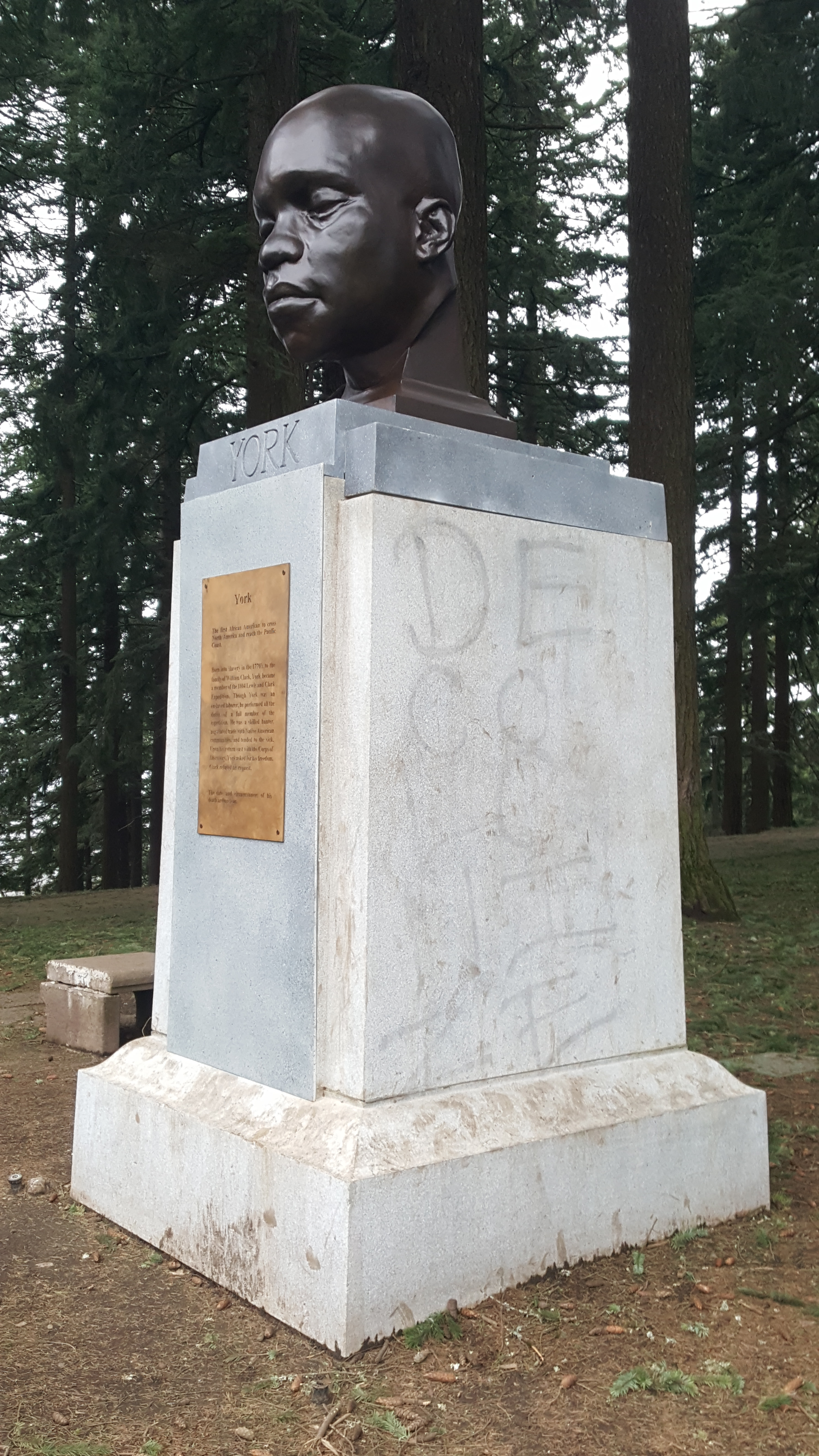
- The bust in February 2021
- Artist: Todd McGrain
- Year: 2021
- Medium: Wood and urethane sculpture
- Subject: York
- Location: Portland, Oregon, U.S.; 45°30′41.7″N 122°35′32.6″W

A four-foot (1.2 m) bust of York, the only African American on the Lewis and Clark Expedition, was installed in Portland, Oregon's Mount Tabor Park, in the United States, from February to July 2021. The artist stayed anonymous at first, but after the bust was removed he revealed himself as Todd McGrain. McGrain was a student of Darrell Millner, Portland State University professor of history and Black Studies. The bust appeared on February 20, replacing the statue of Harvey W. Scott, which had been toppled on October 20, 2020. McGrain did not seek city permission to install the bust, which McGrain expected to be temporary; on June 11 the city announced that it would remove the bust.

On July 28, vandals tore down and seriously damaged the sculpture. Portland Parks and Recreation removed it, and the Portland City Council released a statement condemning the vandalism. The paper serving as an interpretive plaque was torn into pieces. No individual or group has claimed responsibility for the attack, but Patriot Front, a white supremacist organization that had recently vandalized numerous monuments to African Americans, was suspected. On July 25, three days earlier, the plinth had been defaced with a symbol associated with Patriot Front, and a mural in Portland honoring George Floyd, Breonna Taylor, and Ahmaud Arbery had been defaced with their name.

After the toppling, signs of support for the bust and other tributes appeared at the site.

The artist offered to produce a bust of York in bronze, with no charge for his time and effort, although the casting would have to be paid for. As of September 4, 2021, no decision had been made regarding this offer, however, the city has announced plans to commission a permanent monument of York.

As of May 2026, the Portland Art Museum has a new bronze bust of York by McGrain, and has a community survey for thoughts on where the monument should be placed for the long term.

== Background ==
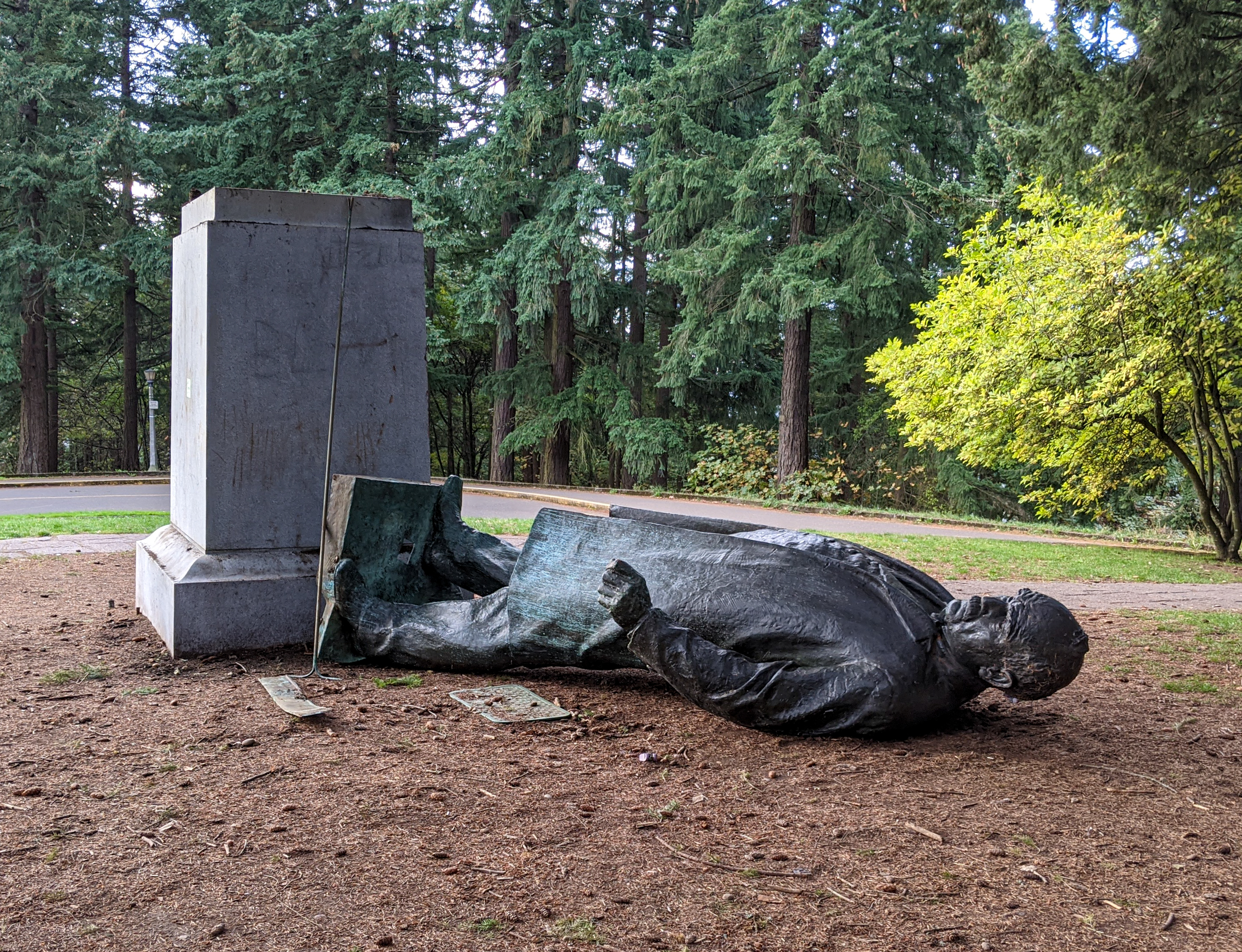
Toppled statue of Harvey W. Scott

The bust of York was erected on a plinth which formerly held the statue of Harvey W. Scott, which was toppled and damaged on October 20, 2020. The statue's outstretched right arm broke off.

That statue was by Gutzon Borglum, a prolific sculptor known for his design and initial sculpting of Mount Rushmore and the monument to the Confederacy at Stone Mountain; Borglum is controversial for his Klan involvement. Scott fought against Native Americans as a volunteer in the Puget Sound War. He was strongly opposed to women's suffrage and public high schools.

On October 11, 2020, the Indigenous Peoples Day of Rage, protesters also toppled statues of Abraham Lincoln and Theodore Roosevelt, for their perceived hostility towards Native Americans. Earlier in 2020, Portland statues of George Washington and Thomas Jefferson were also toppled, because they owned enslaved people.

None of these statues will be re-erected. The Regional Arts & Culture Council in 2021 adopted a policy that allows removal of statues whose "subject or impact...is significantly at odds with values of antiracism, equity, inclusion." While no formal decision has been made (as of August 2021), it is presumed that all of these statues would fall in that category.

== Description ==
The bald head, looking down, was created by the artist. There is no contemporary image of York nor any description of him, except that he was a large man.

The bust was deliberately made of perishable materials: wood covered in urethane, which was then painted bronze. A sheet of paper resembling a plaque, attached to a sheet of plywood painted to resemble marble, had a printed message:

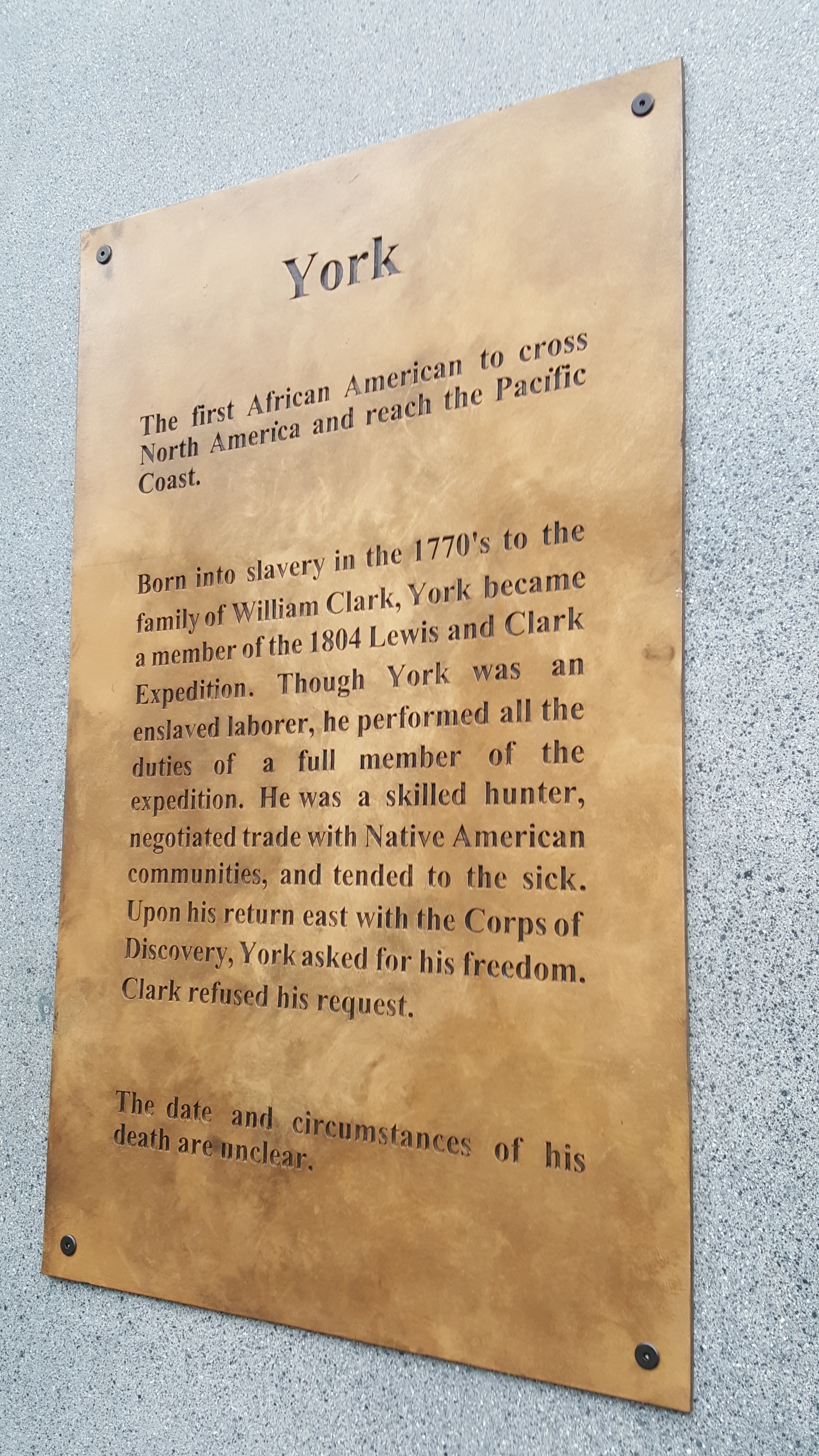
Printed message

York

The first African American to cross North America and reach the Pacific Coast.

Born into slavery in the 1770s to the family of William Clark, York became a member of the 1804 Lewis and Clark Expedition. Though York was an enslaved laborer, he performed all the duties of a full member of the expedition. He was a skilled hunter, negotiated trade with Native American communities and tended to the sick. Upon his return east with the Corps of Discovery, York asked for his freedom. Clark refused his request.

The date and circumstances of his death are unclear.

== Reaction to the bust ==
Reaction to the bust has been "overwhelmingly positive". A newspaper described the reaction as "adoration". The bust became a destination. Adena Long, director of Portland Parks & Recreation, described the artwork as "a complete surprise", "a happy surprise". City Parks Commissioner Carmen Rubio said in a press release: "We should regard this installation for both the important piece that it is, as well as a much-needed reminder to city leaders to hasten our work of rooting out white supremacy in our institutions—particularly our city government, where many processes exclude community participation and discourage engagement."

Prior to its destruction, the arts program manager for Portland had said the bust would remain on display until it deteriorated.

== Vandalism ==
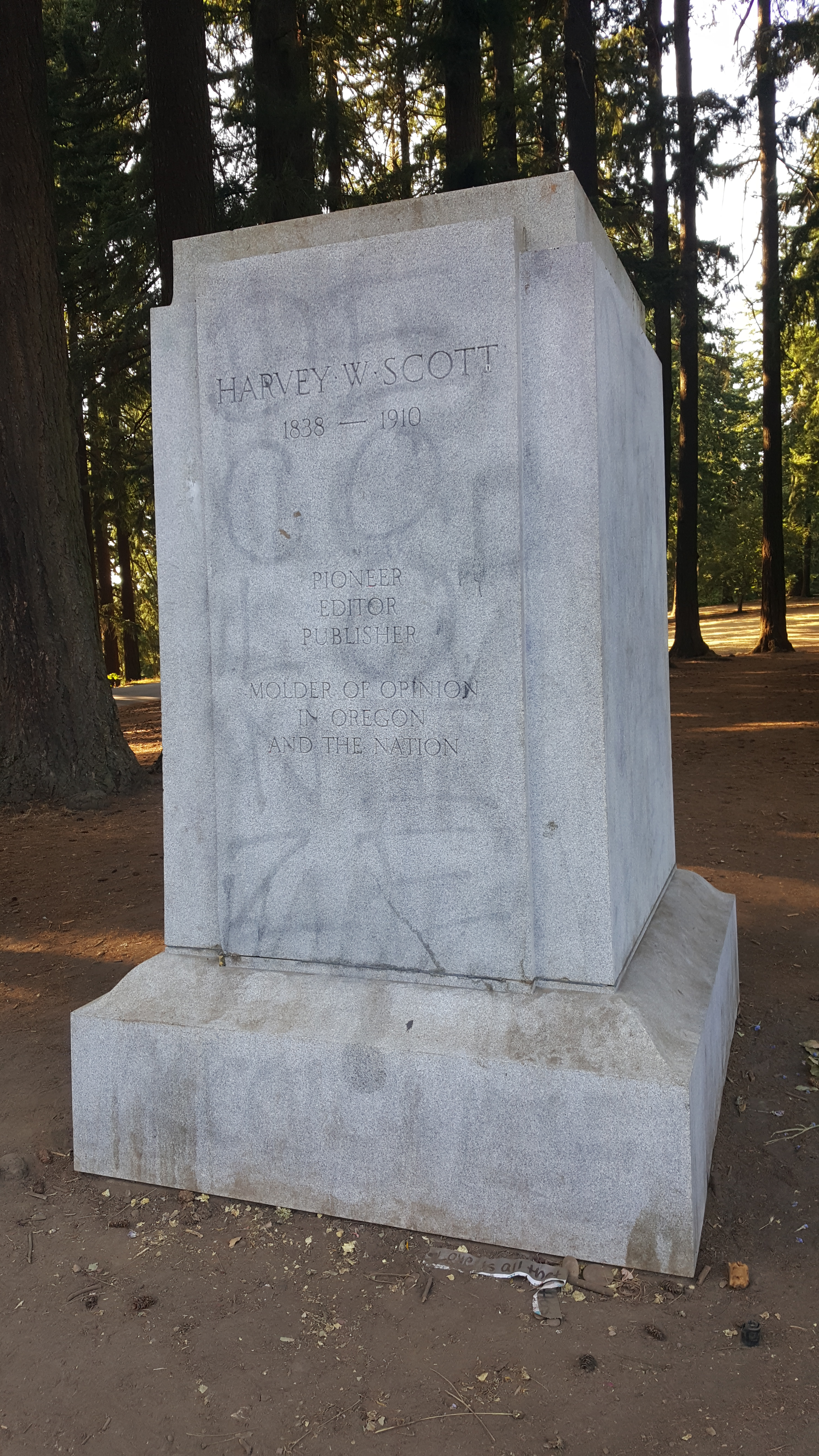
The plinth in August 2021, following the toppling of the bust

The bust was vandalized three times before it was toppled.

- In March, 2021, someone wrote "His Blood Is on Your Hands", "Land Back", and "Decolonize" with spray paint.
- On June 8, 2021, a woman was filmed defacing the plinth with purple paint while shouting that the image of a white man should not be replaced with that of a black man. With the paint she wrote "love not hate", two female symbols, and an altered male symbol. She tore down the paper plaque. She "appears to say she considers herself the victim of racial discrimination by Black and Hispanic people." She was charged by police with criminal mischief, abuse of venerated objects, unlawful applying of graffiti, and vandalism.
- During the night of June 26–27, 2021, it was defaced with a red logo resembling a symbol used by the white supremacist group Patriot Front.

According to the city's arts program manager, the work is made of wood and urethane and "was always intended to be temporary". There have been discussions to replace with a bronze version.

In July 2021, the bust was toppled, then removed by city workers; the director of Portland's park service said that staff would inspect the bust to see if it was salvageable. Portland City Council condemned the vandalism, and locals left signs and other tributes at the site following the toppling.

== New bust at Portland Art Museum ==
As of May 2026, the Portland Art Museum has a new bronze bust of York by McGrain, and has a community survey for thoughts on where the monument should be placed for the long term.

== Media ==
- Video of the bust, February 22, 2021.
- Interview with Oregon Historical Society executive director Kerry Tymchuk, February 22, 2021.
- Searching for York, documentary, Oregon Public Broadcasting, February 27, 2021. Darrell Millner, Quintard Taylor, and James Hollbrook participate.
- Jeanette K. Grode spraying paint on the pedestal, June 9, 2021
- "What Kind of Public Art Do We Want Now?" A conversation with PSU Professor and York historian Darrell Millner, the unidentified York artist, and Kristin Calhoun, Director of Public Art, Regional Arts & Culture Council, August 19, 2021. A transcript is available.

== See also ==
- 2021 in art
