= Leslie M. Scott =

American historian, newspaper publisher and politician

Leslie McChesney Scott
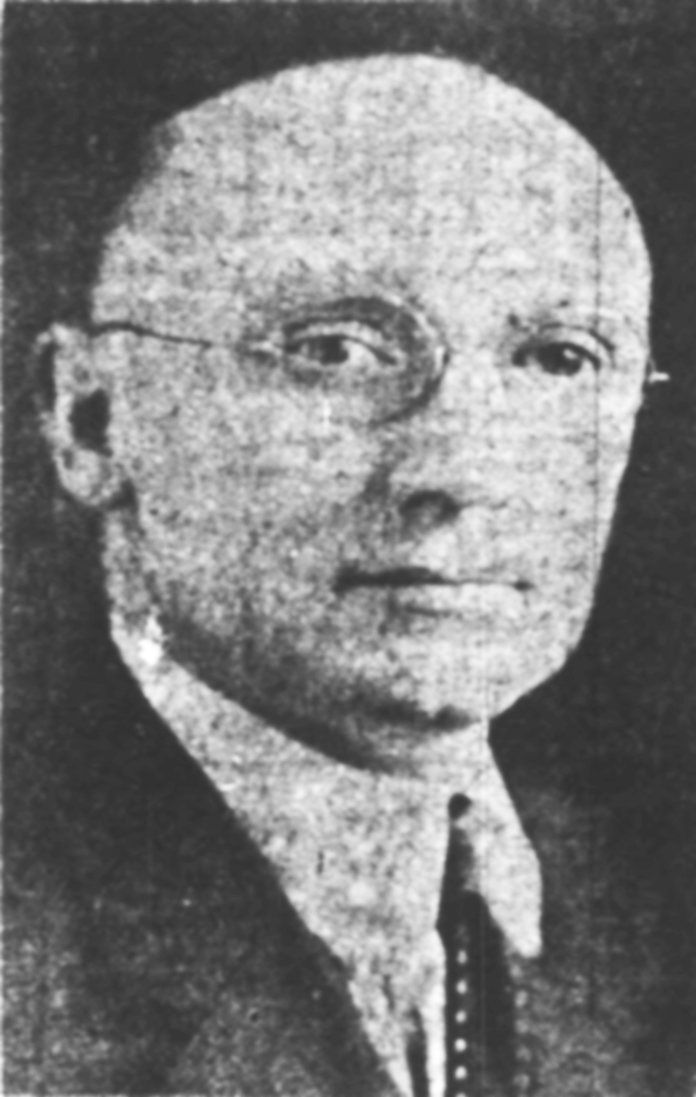
- Scott in 1941

Oregon State Treasurer
- In office January 6, 1941 – January 3, 1949
- Governor: Charles A. Sprague; Earl Snell; John H. Hall
- Preceded by: Walter Pearson
- Succeeded by: Walter Pearson

Personal details
- Born: February 18, 1878 Portland, Oregon
- Died: December 18, 1968 (aged 90) Portland, Oregon
- Party: Republican
- Occupation: Publisher

Leslie McChesney Scott (February 18, 1878 – December 18, 1968) was an American historian, newspaper publisher and Republican politician in Oregon. He served as Oregon State Treasurer from 1941-1949. He served as acting Governor of Oregon for a period in 1948. He was also president of the Portland, Oregon Chamber of Commerce.

He served as chairman of the Oregon Historical Quarterly and served more than 40 years on the board of the Oregon Historical Society.

Scott and his father, Oregonian editor Harvey W. Scott, compiled the six-volume A History of the Oregon Country. Leslie Scott served on the board of The Oregonian starting in 1939. In 1940, he was elected as a Republican to the office of State Treasurer, taking office on January 6, 1941. Scott won re-election to a second four-year term in 1944, and then left office on January 3, 1949.

His house in Portland, the Leslie M. Scott House, built circa 1910, is on the National Register of Historic Places (NRHP). The NRHP-listed Coleman-Scott House is also associated with Scott.

Political offices
Preceded by Walter E. Pearson	Treasurer of Oregon; 1941–1949	Succeeded by Walter J. Pearson
