= Mary A. and Caleb D. Scott House =

Historic house in Iowa, United States

- U.S. National Register of Historic Places
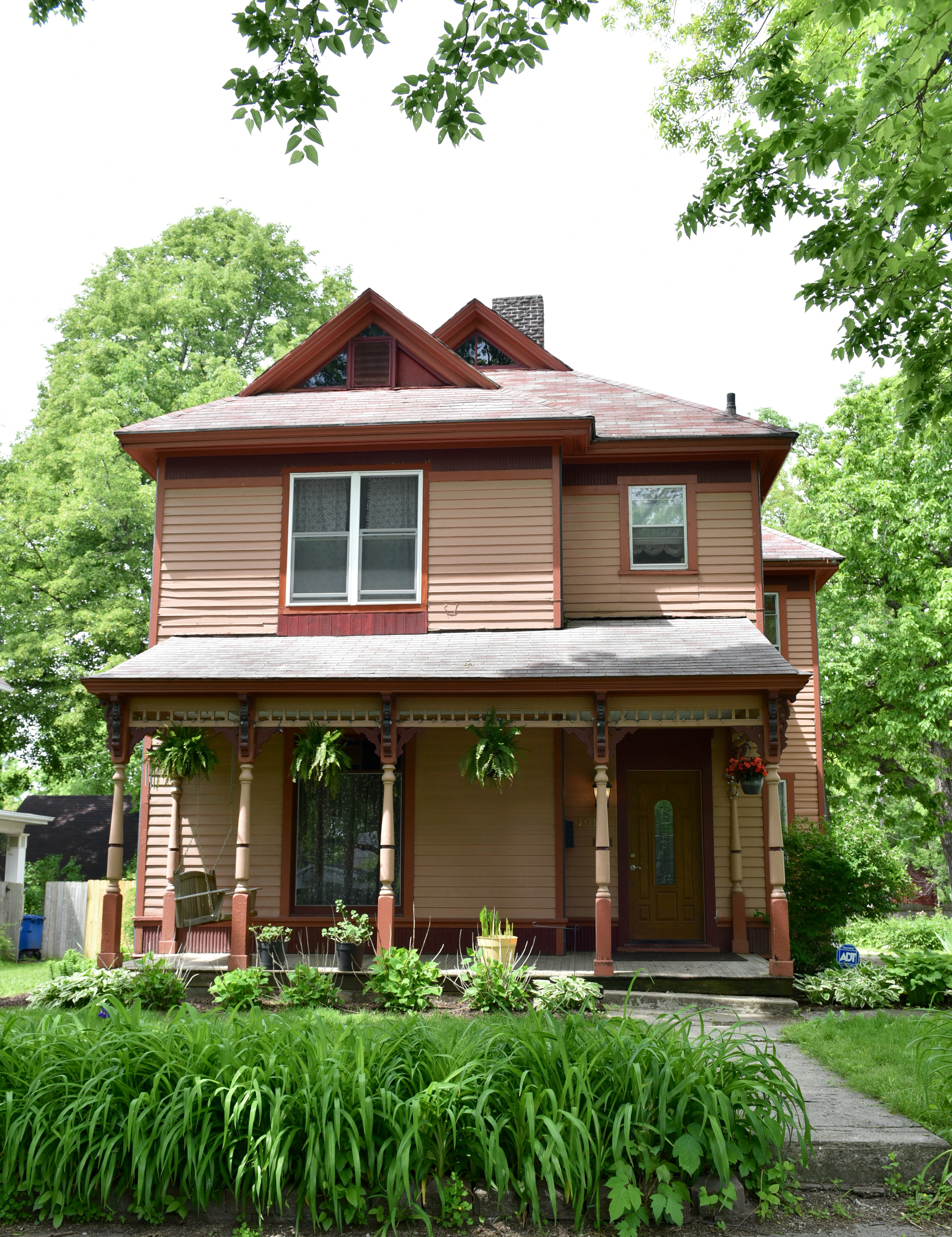

- Location within Iowa Location within the United States
- Location: 1014 26th St. Des Moines, Iowa
- Coordinates: 41°35′44.7″N 93°39′09″W
- Area: less than one acre
- Built: 1889
- Architectural style: Late Victorian
- MPS: Drake University and Related Properties in Des Moines, Iowa, 1881--1918 MPS
- NRHP reference No.: 88001332
- Added to NRHP: September 8, 1988

The Mary A. and Caleb D. Scott House is a historic building located in Des Moines, Iowa, United States. This 2½-story dwelling features a hipped roof with gablets, various gables, reeded panels along cornice and base, and a shed-roofed porch with brackets, turned columns, and an open grill. The property on which it stands is one of ten plats that were owned by Drake University. The house's significance is attributed to the effect of the University's innovative financing techniques upon the settlement of the area around the campus. Charles H. Atkins and R.T.C. Lord owned the property between 1887 and 1888. Mary A. Scott bought the property in 1888 and the house was built the following year. She lived here in 1889 with Caleb D. Scott, a streetcar conductor, and James L. Scott, who was retired. The Scotts lived here until 1899. The house was listed on the National Register of Historic Places in 1988.
