= Harvey W. Scott =

American journalist (1838–1910)

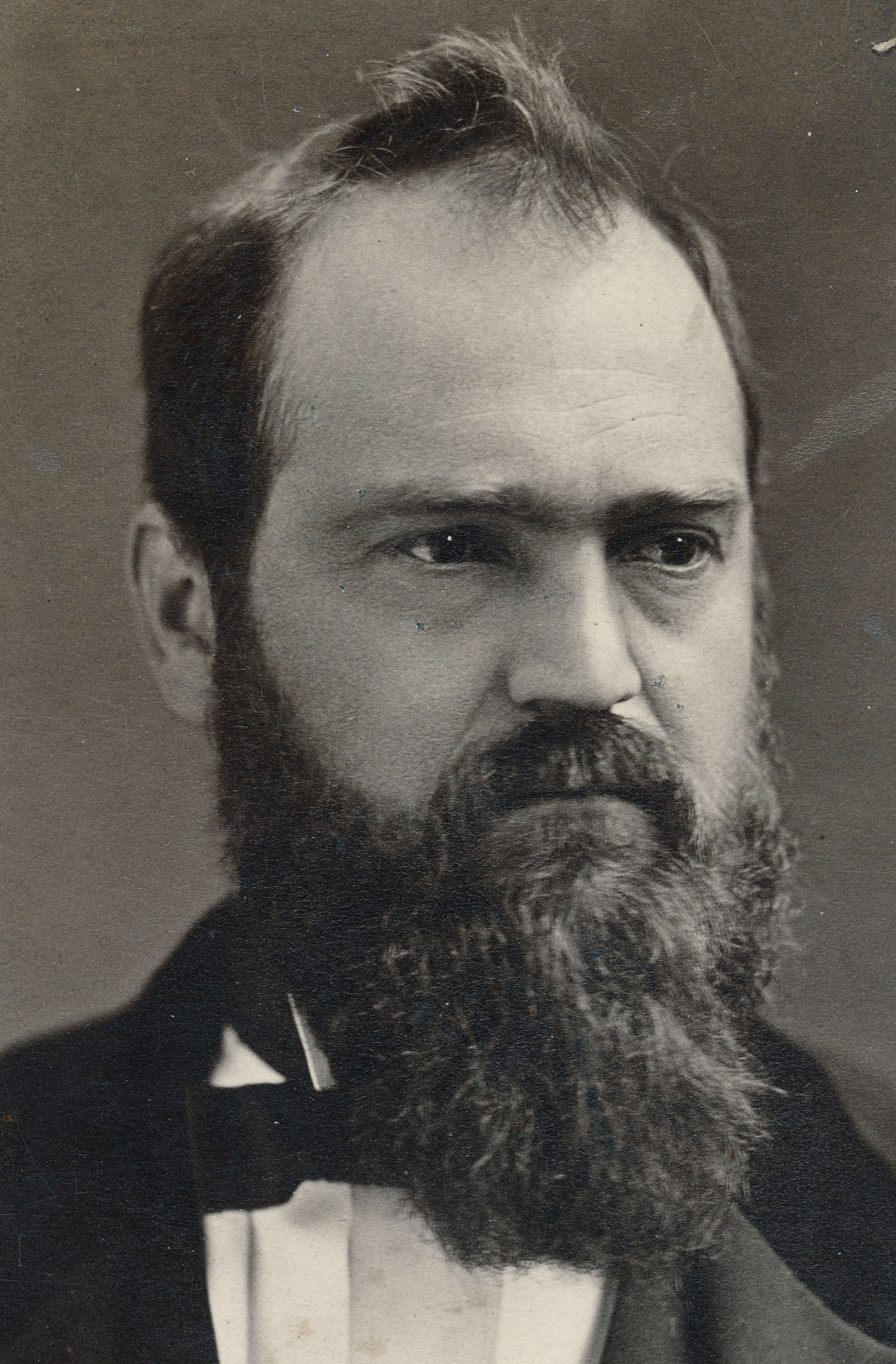
- Scott c. 1873 – c. 1878
- Born: February 1, 1838; Tazewell County, Illinois
- Died: August 7, 1910 (aged 72); Baltimore, Maryland
- Occupation(s): Newspaper editor, The Oregonian

Harvey Whitefield Scott (1838–1910) was an American pioneer who traveled to Oregon in 1852. Scott was a long-time editorialist, and eventual part owner of The Oregonian newspaper. Scott was regarded by his contemporaries as instrumental in bringing the state of Oregon firmly into the political camp of the Republican Party.

== Early years and education ==
Scott was born February 1, 1838, in rural Tazewell County, Illinois, near the town of Peoria, the son of John Tucker Scott, a farmer. The family crossed the Rocky Mountains as pioneers to Oregon in 1852. During the trip, his mother, Ann Roelofson Scott, died. His eight siblings included notable sisters Abigail Scott Duniway, and Catherine Amanda Coburn. The family settled in Yamhill County, where they remained one year before relocating north to Mason County on Puget Sound in the Washington Territory.

Harvey Scott in 1857.

In 1855 and 1856, Scott fought for a year as a volunteer in the Puget Sound War, serving with the local militia in skirmishes against the Nisqually, Muckleshoot, Puyallup, and Klickitat peoples.

With the so-called Indian War at an end, in 1857, Scott walked 150 miles from the family home on Puget Sound to Forest Grove, Oregon, where he attended high school for four months. During this interval, Scott's parents moved their own home from the Washington Territory back to Oregon, establishing for themselves a new farm about 20 miles south of Oregon City. The family moved again in 1859, establishing a saw mill at Forest Grove.

Harvey Scott spent the years from 1859 to 1863 splitting his time between farm work and mill work and education, working his way through school. He entered the fledgling Pacific University at Forest Grove and in 1863 became the first alumnus of that institution, head of a graduating class consisting only of himself.

== Career ==
After graduation from school, Scott spent a year in Idaho as a gold miner. This interlude proved brief, however, and in 1864 he returned to Oregon, studying law in the office of attorney E.D. Shattuck, a leading Republican and Unionist during the ongoing American Civil War. Scott supported himself while reading law by working as the librarian of the Library Association of Portland.

In 1865, Scott's plans to become an attorney came to an abrupt end when he was offered and accepted a position as editorial writer for the Portland Morning Oregonian.

=== Newspaper editor ===
Scott was editor of The Oregonian newspaper from 1866 to 1872. His editorials strongly supported the Union and the newly emerging Republican party during the Civil War. According to many sources, he was highly respected throughout his career, and did much to establish the field of journalism in Oregon. He was active nationally, and served on the board of directors of the Associated Press. Alfred Powers questioned his legacy, writing in 1936 that Scott was "lacking in sympathy and humanity" and that he "held to outworn social theories," and that his scholarship and character were overestimated.

=== Later career ===
Harvey W. Scott as he appeared near the end of his life.

After leaving the paper in 1872, Scott was the collector of customs for the Port of Portland until 1877. He then bought a sizable amount of stock in The Oregonian and returned as its editor-in-chief. Around 1880, he vociferously opposed public high schools in Oregon, especially Portland, stating "the machinery of the schools has grown too cumbrous and expensive a system; that there are too many studies; that the high school is not a proper part of the system of public education;... that those who desire for their children an education beyond the common branches of the old-fashioned common school should pay for it."

Scott was a Scottish Rite Freemason.

=== Historian ===
Scott also edited the first history of Portland, Oregon, published in 1890, and compiled the six-volume History of the Oregon Country with his son, Leslie M. Scott, who published it after Harvey's death.

== Death and legacy ==
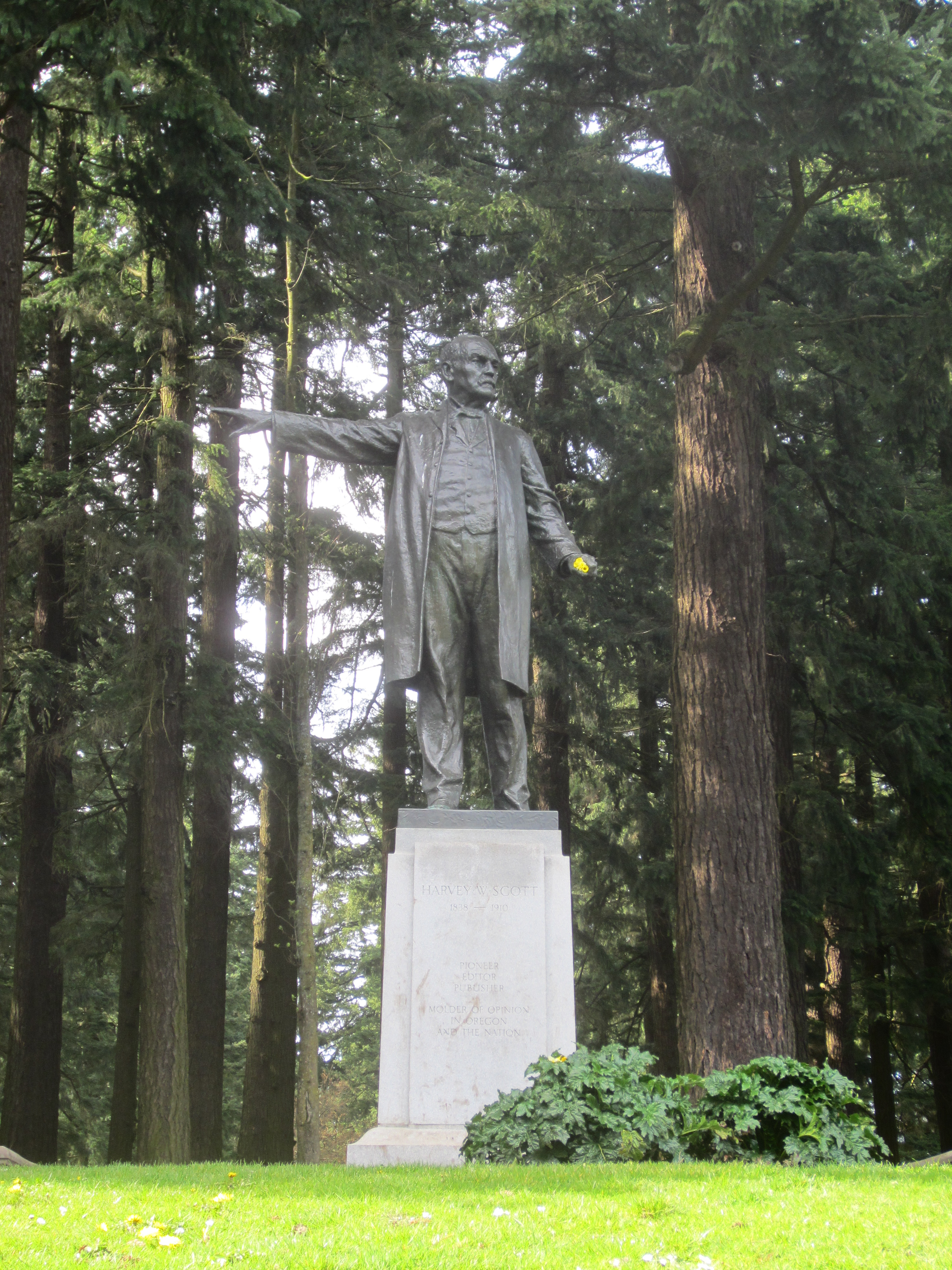
Statue of Harvey W. Scott by Gutzon Borglum at Mount Tabor Park. (installed: 1933 and toppled: 2020)

Scott died unexpectedly following surgery in Baltimore, Maryland, on August 7, 1910. His body was buried at River View Cemetery in Portland. His wife, Margaret Scott, died in 1925.

Mount Scott, an extinct volcano in Happy Valley, was named after him, as was Harvey Scott Elementary School in Northeast Portland. Using $10,000 left in his widow's will for the purpose, Gutzon Borglum (notable for sculptures on Mount Rushmore) was commissioned to erect a statue of Harvey W. Scott. The city council chose the summit of Mount Tabor for the statue in 1928 and Borglum placed a model of the statue there in 1930. The bronze statue was dedicated on July 22, 1933, with approximately 3000 in attendance, 23 years after Scott died. Oregon governor Julius Meier was chairman of the event and Chester Harvey Rowell gave a speech.

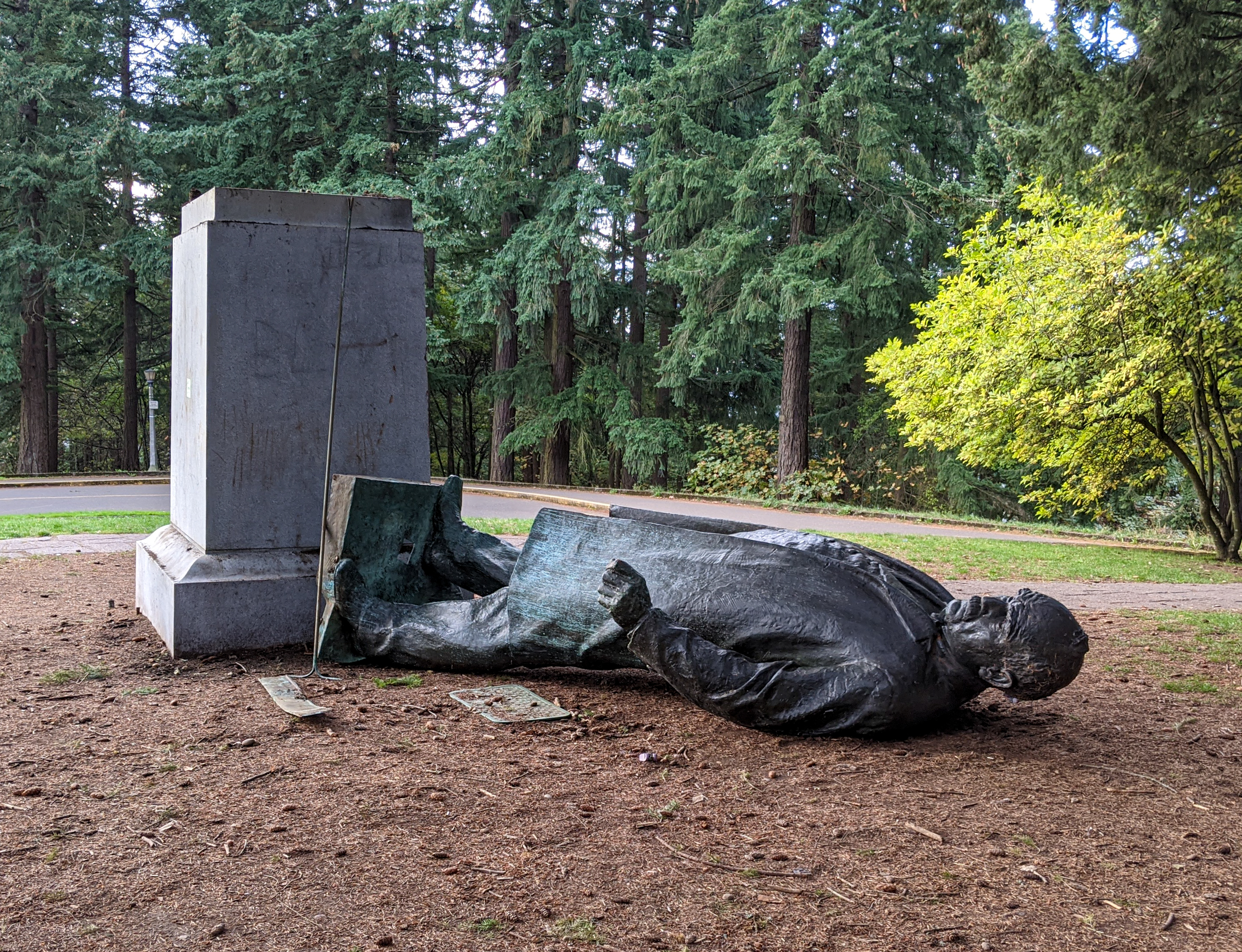
Harvey Scott statue toppled by anti-racist activists in 2020.

The statue was toppled during the early morning hours of October 20, 2020 in relation to racial justice protests in Portland. An unauthorized bust of York was installed around February 17, 2021 in the now-empty location where Scott's statue used to be. On October 24, 2022, The Oregonian published evidence that Scott's 40-year tenure as the newspaper's editor was an era when "overtly racist words" were commonly published in its pages. In response to the article, in December 2022, the board of Pacific University voted unanimously to remove Scott's name from a campus building.

== Works ==
- History of Portland, Oregon: With Illustrations and Biographical Sketches of Prominent Citizens and Pioneers. Syracuse, NY: D. Mason & Co., 1890.
- Religion, Theology and Morals: Selected Editorials and Public Lectures Compiled by Leslie M. Scott. Cambridge, MA: Riverside Press, 1917.
- History of the Oregon Country. With Leslie M. Scott. Cambridge, MA: Riverside Press, 1924.

== See also ==
- Lewis and Clark Centennial Exposition – Scott was president from 1903 to 1905.
- Henry Pittock
- Decolonization of public space
