= Mount Scott (Clackamas County, Oregon) =

Volcanic cinder cone in Clackamas County, Oregon, United States

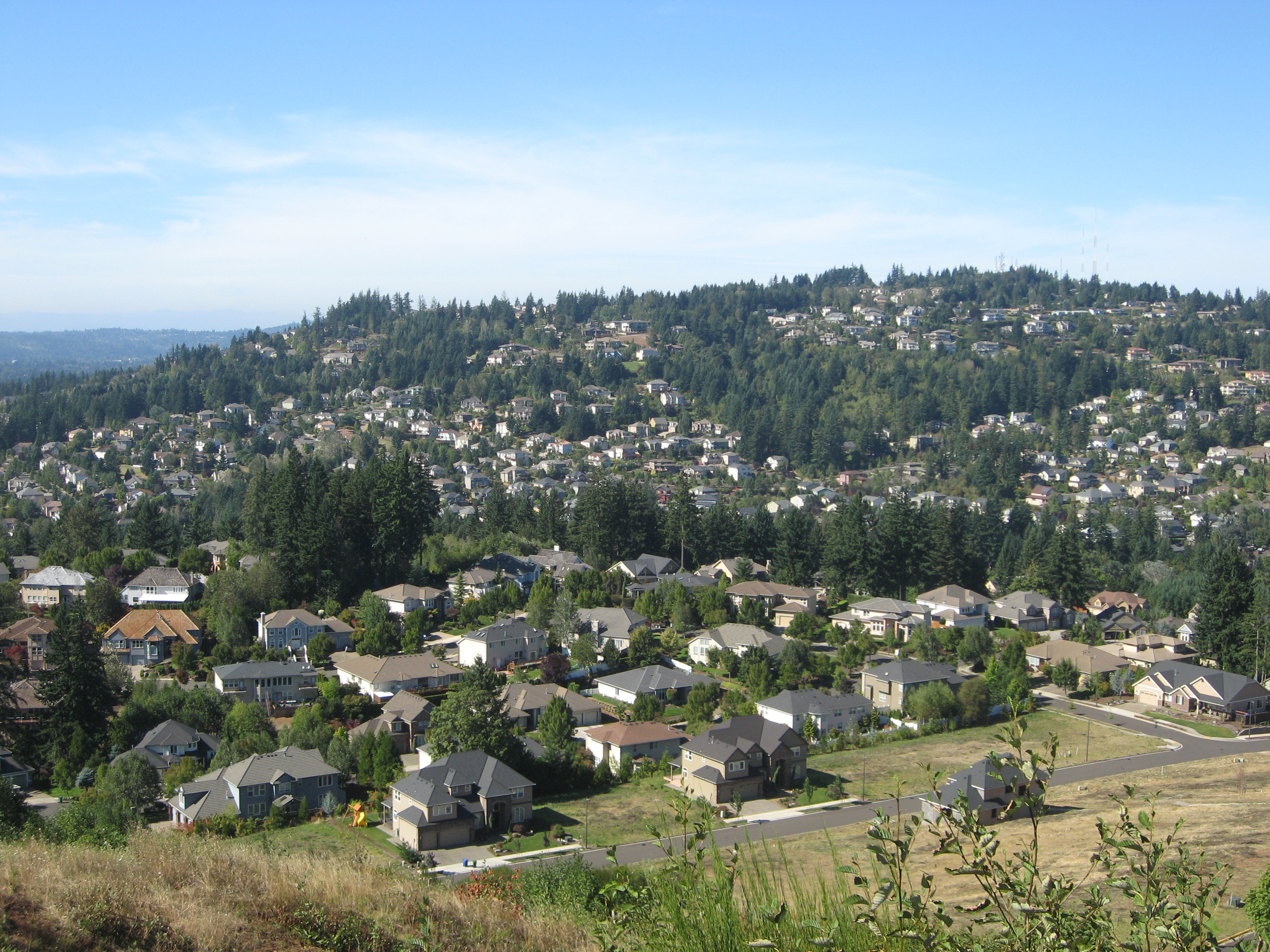
- Southeast slope of Mount Scott, with the city of Happy Valley

Highest point
- Elevation: 1,091 ft (333 m) NAVD 88
- Prominence: 740 ft (230 m)
- Coordinates: 45°27′16″N 122°33′05″W

Naming
- Etymology: Named for Harvey W. Scott

Geography
- Location within Oregon
- Location: Clackamas County, Oregon, U.S.
- Parent range: Cascades
- Topo map: USGS Gladstone

Geology
- Volcanic field: Boring Lava Field
- Last eruption: 500,000 years ago

Mount Scott is a volcanic cinder cone with its summit in Clackamas County, Oregon. The summit rises to an elevation of 1,091 feet (333 m). It is part of the Boring Lava Field, a zone of ancient volcanic activity in the area around Portland, and was named for Harvey W. Scott, a 19th and 20th century editor of The Oregonian newspaper. who owned 335 acres (136 ha) on the north and west slopes of the hill.

Mt. Scott was home to a "perpetual" cross burning by Oregon's Ku Klux Klan in the 1920s. Automotive parades of hooded Klan members were common in Southeast Portland.

The mountain is developed, with most of its southern flank within the city of Happy Valley, Oregon. The Willamette National Cemetery is located on the northeastern slope of the mountain, which is partially in Multnomah County.
