= Scott House (Richmond, Virginia) =

Historic house in Virginia, United States

- U.S. National Register of Historic Places
- Virginia Landmarks Register
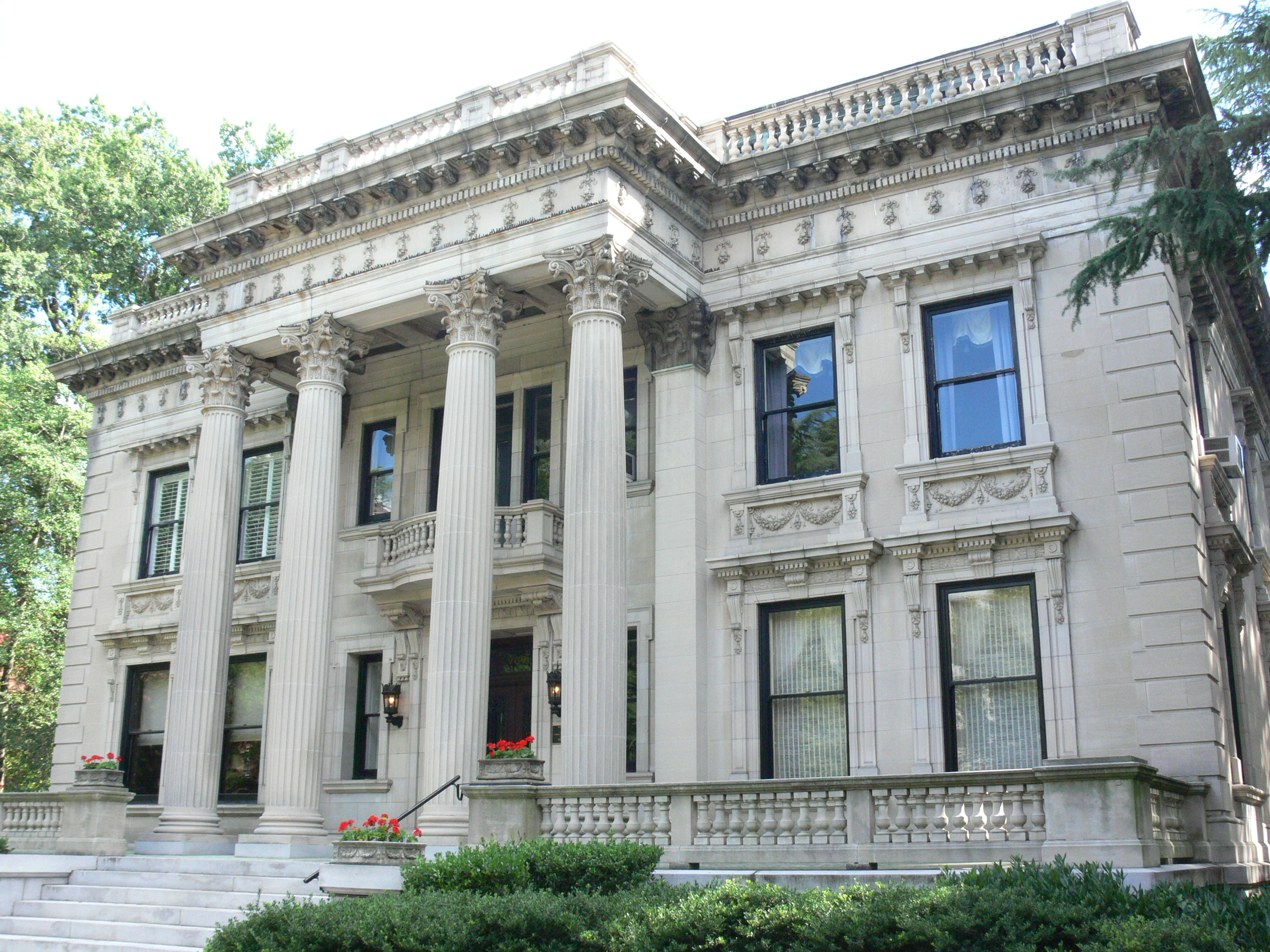
- Scott House, July 2011

- Location within Virginia Location within the United States
- Location: 909 W. Franklin St., Richmond, Virginia
- Coordinates: 37°33′1″N 77°27′5″W
- Area: 0.8 acres (0.32 ha)
- Built: 1907
- Architect: Baskervill, Henry
- Architectural style: Beaux Arts
- NRHP reference No.: 05001545
- VLR No.: 127-0228-0001

Significant dates
- Added to NRHP: November 26, 2007
- Designated VLR: June 16, 2004

Scott House, also known as Frederic W. Scott House and Scott-Bocock House, is a historic home located in Richmond, Virginia and is owned by Virginia Commonwealth University as the university's alumni house. The first floor of the historic house is available for university, community and corporate events. Many affairs — including university and alumni receptions and retreats — have occurred at the Scott House since its doors opened in the fall of 2004.

It was listed on the National Register of Historic Places in 2007.

== History ==
It was built in 1907, and is a three-story, 40,950 square foot, Beaux Arts style mansion. The house is seven bays wide and is faced with a pale Indiana limestone. It features a central portico of four, giant Corinthian order columns and two Corinthian pilasters that dominate the highly formal, symmetrical entrance façade. On the interior, the first floor of the Scott House can be understood as an architectural museum, with rooms in many different styles. Also on the property is a Tudor-style, half-timbered carriage house (1902).

Elizabeth and Frederic Scott bought the property from Lewis Ginter in 1903, and soon thereafter commissioned the popular firm of Noland and Baskervill to design the magnificent estate. The couple is buried at Hollywood Cemetery and their daughter, Elisabeth Scott Bocock, moved into the house in the mid 20th century. While there, she founded the Historic Richmond Foundation, the 2300 Club, and the Hand Workshop (now known as the Visual Arts Center of Richmond). In the 1960s, the house was subdivided and used as dorms for VCU students, which continued into the 90s. A renovation in 2004 led to the Scott House opening its doors to the public, and the designation of the building as a Virginia Historic Landmark. The historic Marble House in Newport, Rhode Island was chosen as inspiration for the Richmond structure, which was itself modeled after the Petit Trianon in Versailles. It stands proudly removed from West Franklin, an exception to the block's density. The stately house, a handsome combination of limestone and terra cotta, is grounded by green-tiled wrapping terraces and a porte-cochére, shaded by trees in the house's garden. Oxidized copper and careful cast iron work beautifully balance the gravity of the building's exterior. Oversized fluted columns with Corinthian capitals give the mansion a sense of monumentality. The interior is a classic example of the American Renaissance style, originating in the 18th century. The occupant moves through the public, symmetrically divided rooms with no hallways on the first floor, structured around a main entrance stair which lies under a magnificent stained glass dome. Servants’ quarters are to the rear of the building, and a large English style carriage house is hidden behind the mansion. The Anderson Gallery, constructed in 1888 from the former Ginter House stables, also stands behind the Scott-Bocock House. The splendor of the structure is a reminder of Richmond's insurance-and-banking glory days in the early 20th century, when it was an indulgent capital of the South.
