= Leiper-Scott House =

Historic house in Arkansas, United States

- U.S. National Register of Historic Places
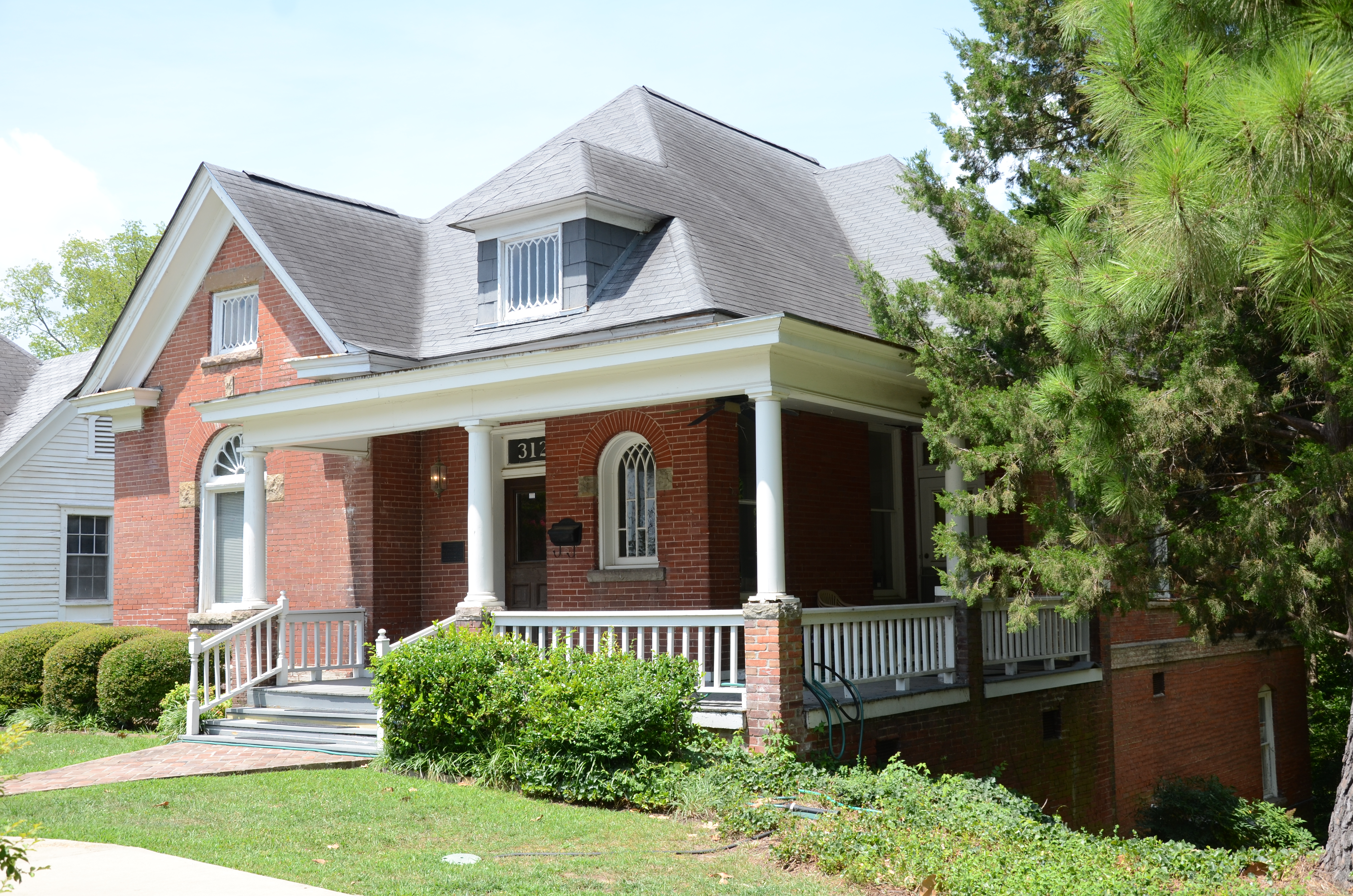

- Location within Arkansas Location within the United States
- Location: 312 S. Pulaski St., Little Rock, Arkansas
- Coordinates: 34°44′51″N 92°17′6″W
- Area: less than one acre
- Built: 1902
- Architectural style: Colonial Revival, Queen Anne
- NRHP reference No.: 80000783
- Added to NRHP: May 1, 1980

The Leiper-Scott House is a historic house at 312 South Pulaski Street in Little Rock, Arkansas. It is a single-story brick structure, with a hip roof adorned with gabled and hipped projections and dormers in an asymmetrical style typical of the Queen Anne period. A porch extends across part of the front around to the side, supported by Tuscan columns mounted on brick piers, with a balustrade between them. The house was built in 1902 for Eric Leiper, owner of a local brickyard, and is locally unusual as a relatively modestly-scaled house built in brick.

The house was listed on the National Register of Historic Places in 1980.

== See also ==
- National Register of Historic Places listings in Little Rock, Arkansas
