= Thomas Scott House (Greensboro, North Carolina) =

Historic house in North Carolina, United States

- U.S. National Register of Historic Places
- Location within North Carolina Location within the United States
- Location: SR 1001, near Greensboro, North Carolina
- Coordinates: 36°10′06″N 79°47′28″W
- Area: 19.6 acres (7.9 ha)
- Built: c. 1821
- NRHP reference No.: 84002328
- Added to NRHP: July 12, 1984

Thomas Scott House is an historic home located near Greensboro, Guilford County, North Carolina. It was built about 1821, and consists of the brick, two-story, single-pile main block and a frame rear ell. It features a three-part corbeled brick cornice at the roofline. Also on the property are two contributing frame outbuildings.

It was listed on the National Register of Historic Places in 1984.
