= Coleman–Scott House =

Historic building in Portland, Oregon, U.S.

- U.S. National Register of Historic Places
- U.S. Historic district – Contributing property
- Portland Historic Landmark
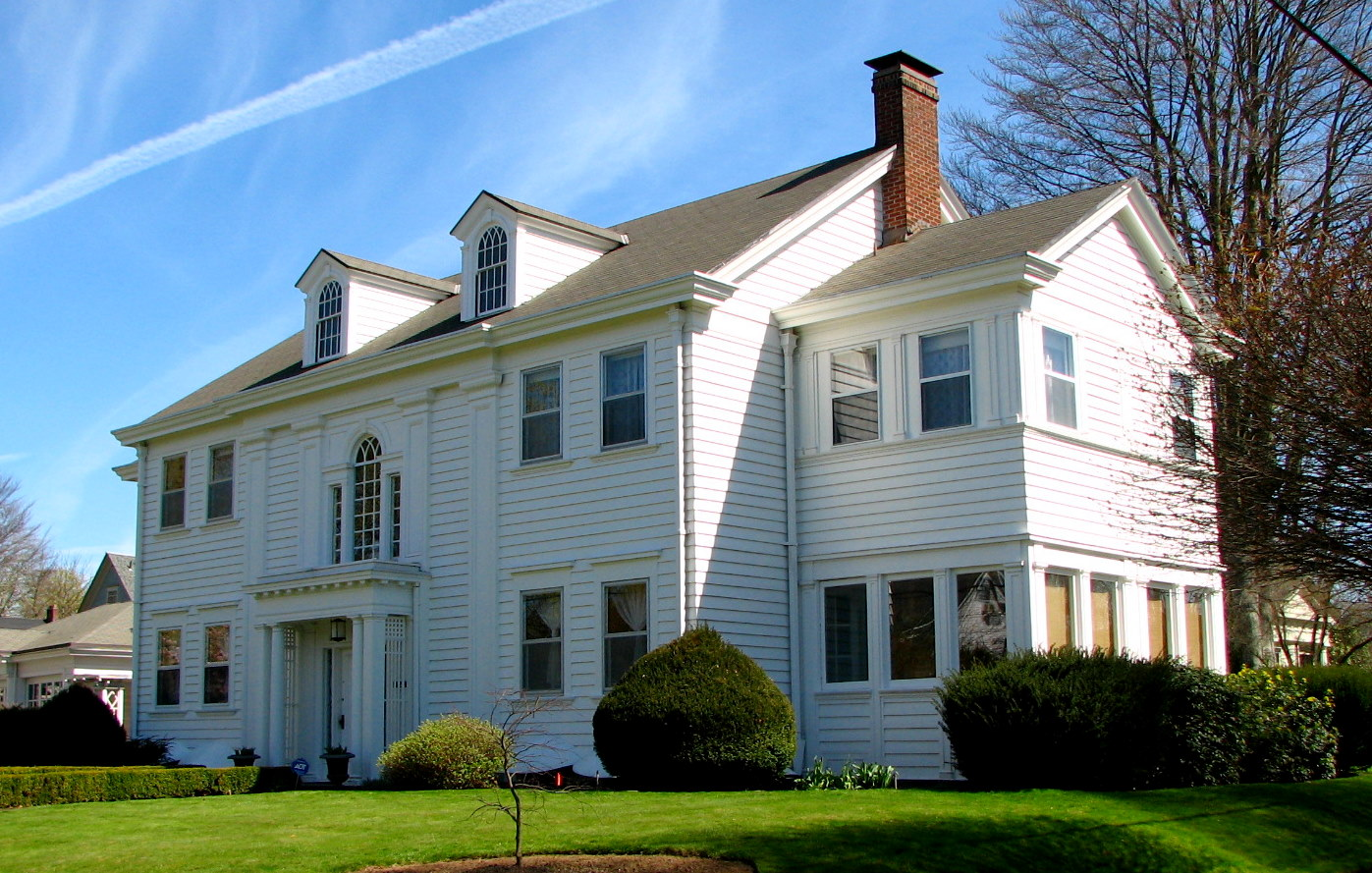

- Location within Portland, Oregon
- Location: 2110 NE 16th Avenue; Portland, Oregon
- Coordinates: 45°32′16″N 122°38′57″W
- Area: less than one acre
- Built: 1916
- Architect: John V. Bennes
- Architectural style: Colonial Revival
- Part of: Irvington Historic District (ID10000850)
- NRHP reference No.: 85003504
- Added to NRHP: November 8, 1985

The Coleman–Scott House is a Colonial Revival house in Northeast Portland, Oregon. It was listed on the National Register of Historic Places in 1985. It was built in 1916 and designed by John V. Bennes.
