= Powell Butte =

Extinct cinder cone butte in Portland, Oregon, U.S.

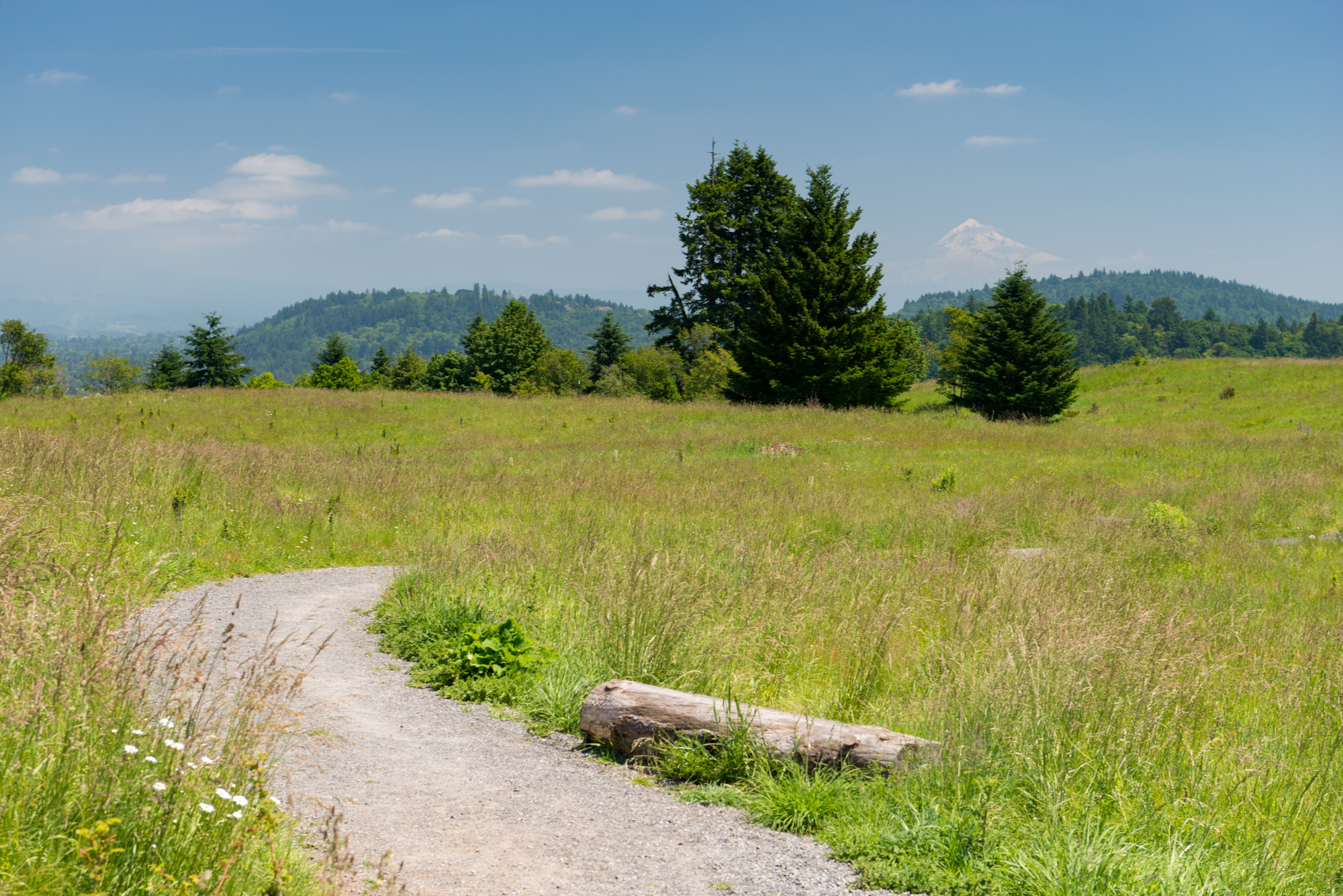
- Trail on Powell Butte

Highest point
- Elevation: 614 ft (187 m) NAVD 88
- Coordinates: 45°29′14″N 122°30′06″W

Geography
- Location within Oregon Location within the United States
- Location: Multnomah County, Oregon, U.S.
- Parent range: Cascades
- Topo map: USGS Gladstone

Geology
- Mountain type: Cinder cone
- Volcanic field: Boring Lava Field
- Last eruption: Extinct

Powell Butte is an extinct cinder cone butte in Portland, Oregon, United States. It is part of the Boring Lava Field, which includes more than 80 small volcanic edifices and lava flows in the Portland–Vancouver metropolitan area. The region around Powell Butte has a cool climate, and the butte and its surroundings feature meadows, rivers, and mixed forests. Powell Butte hosts the Powell Butte Nature Park, which includes about 612 acres (2.48 km^{2}) of trails for biking, hiking, and horseback riding.

Powell Butte lies within historic territory of the Confederated Tribes of the Grand Ronde Community of Oregon. The land surrounding the butte has been used for an orchard and dairy farming. Today two underground reservoirs at the Butte each hold 50,000,000 US gallons (190,000,000 L) of fresh water as a primary part of the public water system for Portland and much of the surrounding region.

== Geography and geology ==
Powell Butte is located in Multnomah County in the U.S. state of Oregon. According to the U.S. National Geodetic Survey, the butte reaches an elevation of 614 feet (187 m), while the Geographic Names Information System lists the mountain's elevation at 627 feet (191 m). J.E. Allen, an emeritus professor of Geology at Portland State University, listed its elevation as 560 feet (170 m) in a 1975 publication.

Powell Butte is a cinder cone butte and is part of the Plio-Pleistocene Boring Lava Field, a group of volcanic cones that got their name from the low, forested Boring Hills formation. Located in the Portland Basin, the Boring Lava Field consists of monogenetic volcanic cones that appear as hills throughout the area, reaching heights of 650 feet (200 m) above their surroundings. The field includes more than 80 small volcanic edifices and lava flows in the Portland–Vancouver metropolitan area, with the possibility of more volcanic deposits buried under sedimentary rock layers. Volcanism in the Boring Lava Field is the product of subduction of the Juan de Fuca oceanic tectonic plate under the North American continental tectonic plate, as well as regional rifting. Powell Butte lies northwest of the Boring Hills, and the surrounding area includes (moving clockwise from the north) other volcanic centers like Green Mountain, Prune Hill, Chamberlain Hill, Devils Rest, Larch Mountain, Pepper Mountain, Kelly Butte, and Mount Tabor.

The top of Powell Butte consists of volcanic rock from the Troutdale Formation, on top of which are remnants from a local eruption in the Boring Lava Field, including scoria and volcanic ash. Powell Butte is one of the smaller volcanic cones in the Boring Lava Field. During the Pliocene (5 million to 2 million years ago), hyaloclastite formed from interaction of Cascade, alumina-rich basalt lava with the Columbia River. After these hyaloclastite units were deposited, further deformation occurred, leading to the accumulation of gravel and lithic fragments to elevations of 600 to 700 feet (180 to 210 m) in the Portland area. Powell Butte is partially mantled by post hyaloclastite gravel from the Troutdale Formation, which is likely the result of redeposited soil after erosion. Like the rest of the Boring Lava Field, Powell Butte is extinct.

== Climate and ecology ==
The climate at Powell Butte is cool, creating a short growing season environment. It supports grass meadows, which sustain apple, pear, and walnut trees.

Powell Butte sits near Johnson Creek, a tributary of the Willamette River that sustains native salmon and rainbow trout. It also supports the Powell Butte Nature Park and its associated meadow and forest areas. These habitats are populated by bats, black-tailed mule deer, chipmunks, coyotes, gray foxes, ground squirrels, rabbits, raccoons, ring-necked pheasants, and skunks. Birds of prey are common among the park's open meadows, groves of wild hawthorn and western red cedar trees, and wetlands. Kestrels and red-tailed hawks hunt on top of the butte. There are mixed forests of bigleaf maple and Douglas fir trees on the butte's northern side.

== Human history ==
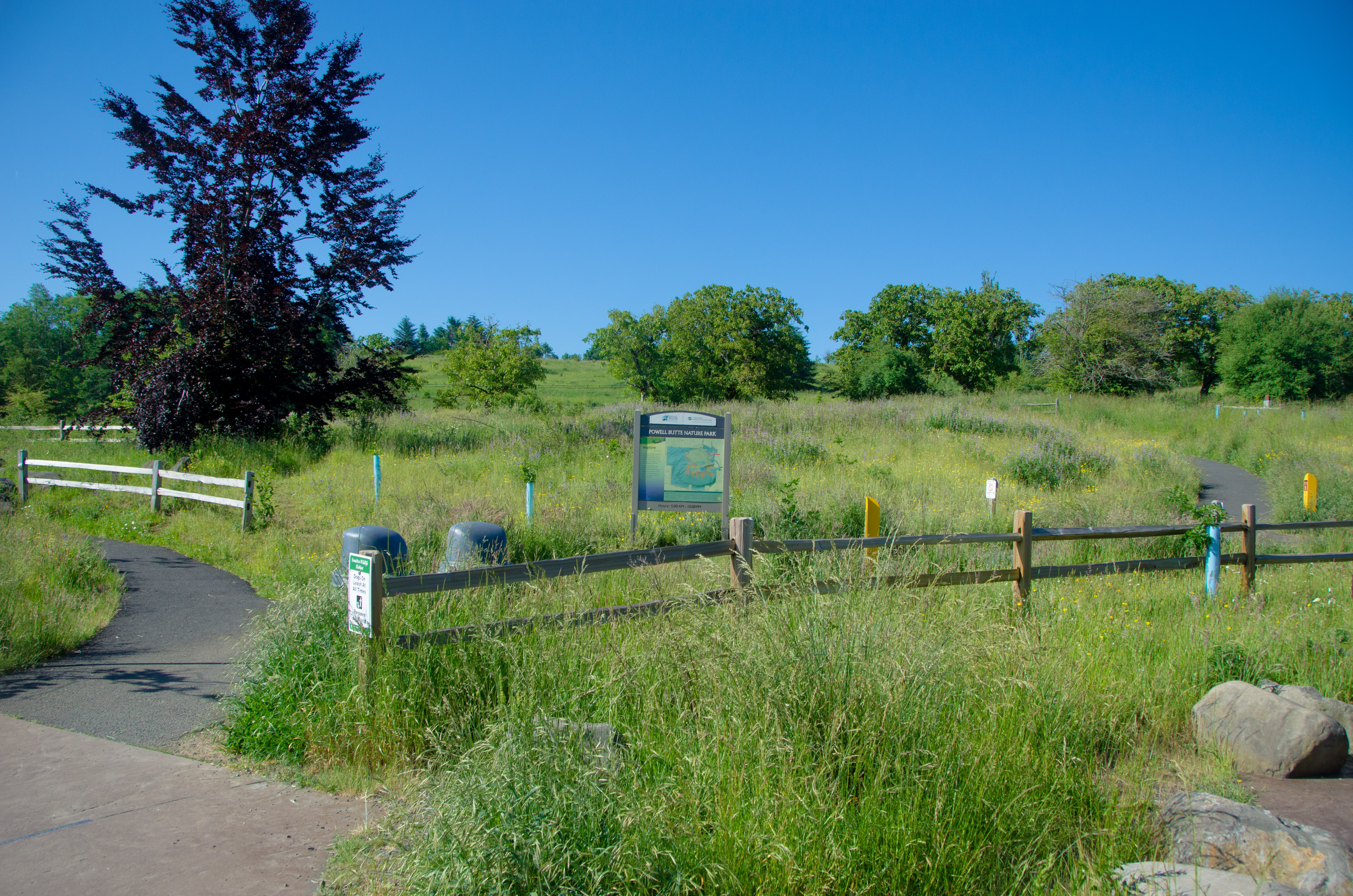
Powell Butte Nature Park, 2017

Powell Butte lies within historic territory of the Confederated Tribes of the Grand Ronde Community of Oregon, which covered more than 20,000,000 acres (81,000 km^{2}) and extended from the Columbia River to the Klamath River. At the end of the 19th century, much of the meadow area near Powell Butte was cleared and replaced with an orchard by settlers. In 1925, the Portland city government bought the land encompassing Powell Butte from George Wilson with the intent to use it for water reservoirs. They leased the northeastern part of the land to farmer Henry Anderegg, who owned and operated the Meadowland Crest Dairy until 1948. In the mid-1970s, Portland's Water Bureau created a development plan for Powell Butte including four 50,000,000-US-gallon (190,000,000 L) underground reservoirs to be built at the northern side of the mountain. The first of these reservoirs was constructed in 1981 and the second in 2014.

== Recreation ==
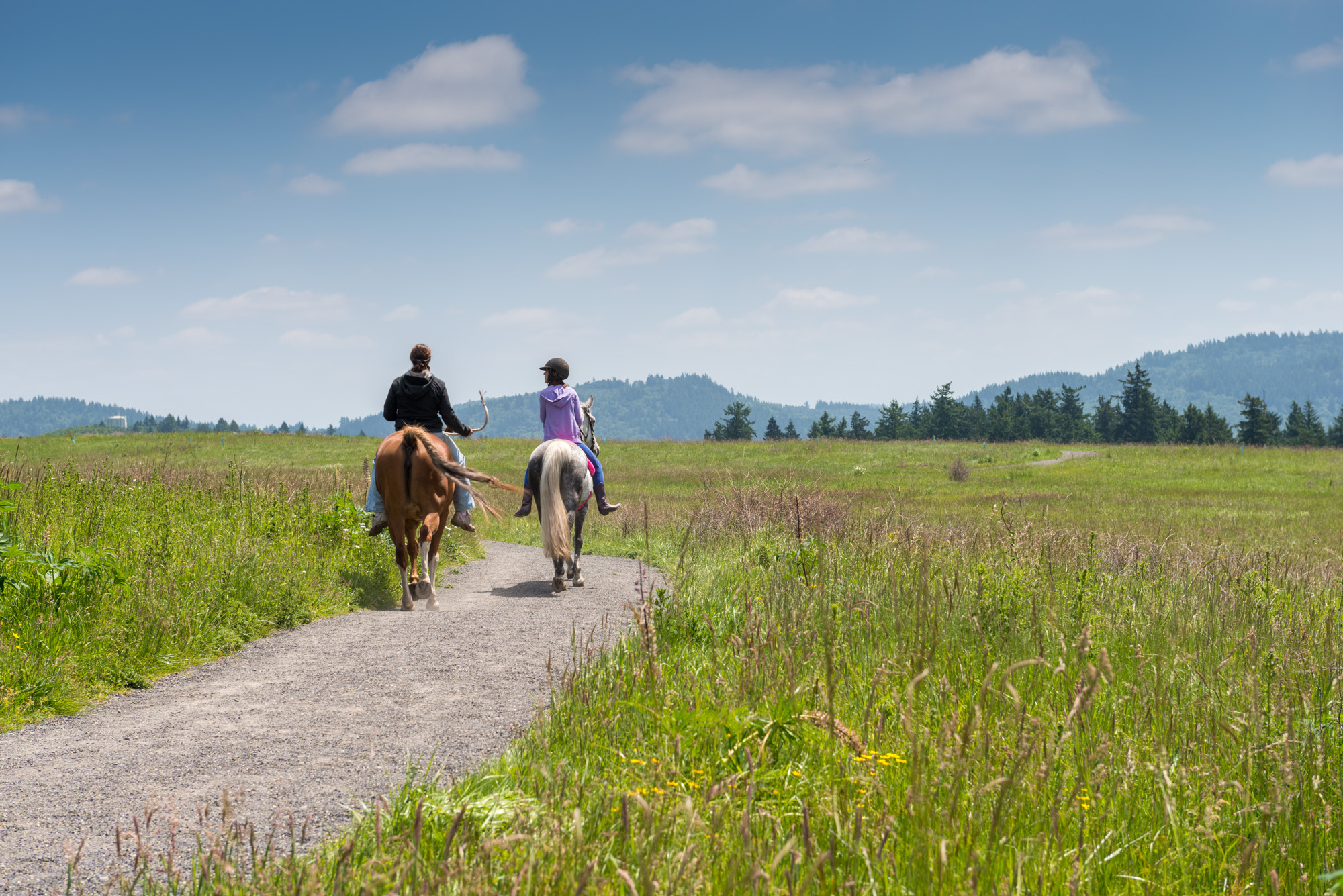
Horseback riding on Powell Butte

Powell Butte hosts the Powell Butte Nature Park, which encompasses an area of about 612 acres (2.48 km^{2}). The nature park was established by Portland city government in 1987 and opened to the public in 1990 and is maintained by Portland Parks & Recreation; it currently includes a natural area, trails for biking, horseback riding, and hiking. The Friends of Powell Butte is an organization formed in 1990, which is focused on protecting the resources of the nature park. It meets monthly to implement park planning and improvement and gather citizen input.

Within the Boring Lava Field, Mount Tabor and Powell Butte are better known for their recreational uses than other cones. Powell Butte Nature Park offers 9 miles (14 km) of trails, with many formal and informal paths. The top of the butte also offers views of Mount Adams, Mount Hood, Mount Jefferson, and Mount St. Helens.

== Sources ==
- Allen, J. E. (September 1975). "Volcanoes of the Portland Area, Oregon". The Ore Bin. 37 (9). Oregon Department of Geology and Mineral Industries. Archived from the original on August 25, 2018.
- Bishop, E. M.; Allen, J. E. (2004). Hiking Oregon's geology (2 ed.). The Mountaineers Books. ISBN 978-0898868470.
- Brown, C. R.; Durst, R. W.; Wrolstad, R.; De Jong, W. (December 2008). "Variability of phytonutrient content of potato in relation to growing location and cooking method". Potato Research. 51 (3–4): 259–270. doi:10.1007/s11540-008-9115-0.
- Evarts, R. C.; Conrey, R. M.; Fleck, R. J.; Hagstrum, J. T. (January 2009), "The Boring Volcanic Field of the Portland-Vancouver area, Oregon and Washington: Tectonically anomalous forearc volcanism in an urban setting", in O'Connor, J. E.; Dorsey, R. J.; Madin, I. P. (eds.), Volcanoes to Vineyards: Geologic Field Trips Through the Dynamic Landscape of the Pacific Northwest, Geological Society of America, pp. 253–270, doi:10.1130/2009.fld015(13), ISBN 9780813756158, Geological Society of America Field Guide 15.
- Swanson, R. D. (1986). A stratigraphic-geochemical study of the Troutdale Formation and Sandy River Mudstone in the Portland basin and lower Columbia River Gorge (Thesis). Portland State University. doi:10.15760/etd.5604. Paper 3720.
- Trimble, D. E. (1963), Geology of Portland, Oregon, and adjacent areas: Bulletin 1119, United States Geological Survey, doi:10.3133/b1119, OCLC 793416650.
