= Boring Lava Field =

Plio-Pleistocene volcanic field in Oregon, United States

- Volcanic field
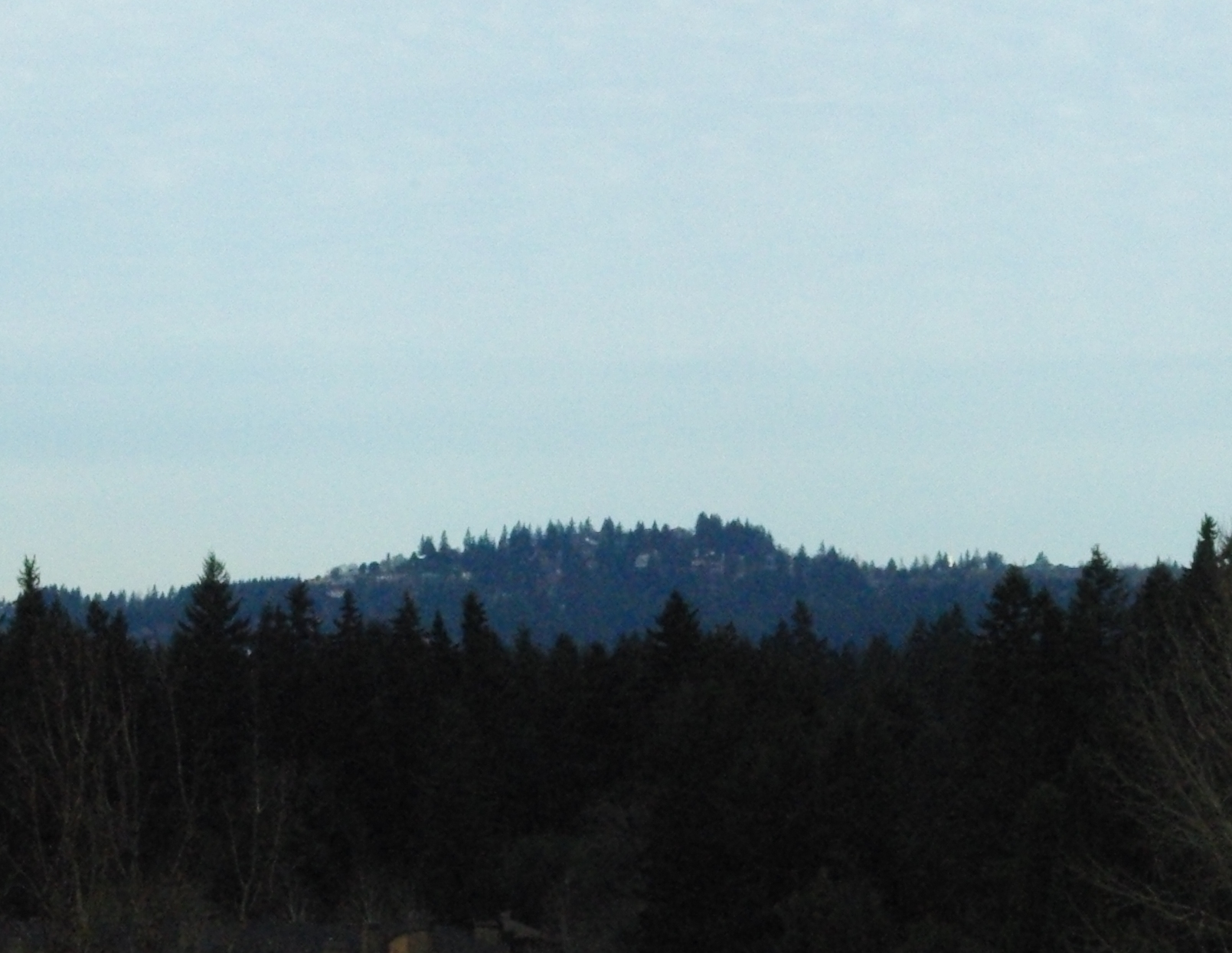
- Mount Sylvania in Portland, Oregon, one of the major volcanoes in the field
- Interactive map of Boring Lava Field
- Location: Oregon and Washington, U.S.
- Age: Plio-Pleistocene
- Highest elevation: 4,061 feet (1,238 m) (Larch Mountain)
- Last eruption: 57,000 years ago

The Boring Lava Field (also known as the Boring Volcanic Field) is a Plio-Pleistocene volcanic field of cinder cones, small shield volcanoes, and lava flows in the northern Willamette Valley of the U.S. state of Oregon and adjacent southwest Washington. The volcanic field is named for the town of Boring, Oregon, located 12 miles (20 km) southeast of downtown Portland and on the edge of the densest cluster of volcanic vents. The zone became volcanically active about 2.7 million years ago, with long periods of eruptive activity interspersed with quiescence. Its last eruptions took place about 57,000 years ago at the Beacon Rock cinder cone volcano. The individual volcanic vents of the field are considered extinct, but the field itself is not.

The Boring Lava Field covers an area of about 1,500 square miles (3,900 km^{2}) and has a total volume of 2.4 cubic miles (10 km^{3}). This region sustains diverse flora and fauna within its habitat areas, which are subject to Portland's moderate climate. The highest point of the field is at Larch Mountain, which reaches an elevation of 4,055 feet (1,236 m).

The Portland metropolitan area, including suburbs, is one of the few places in the continental United States to have extinct volcanoes within a city's limits. The Boring Lava Field has played an important role in local affairs, including the development of the Robertson Tunnel, recreation, and nature parks. Because of the field's proximity to densely populated areas, eruptive activity would be a threat to human life and property, but the probability for future eruptions affecting the region is very low. The field may also influence future earthquakes in the area, as extrusive rock from its historic eruptions may affect ground movement.

== Geography ==
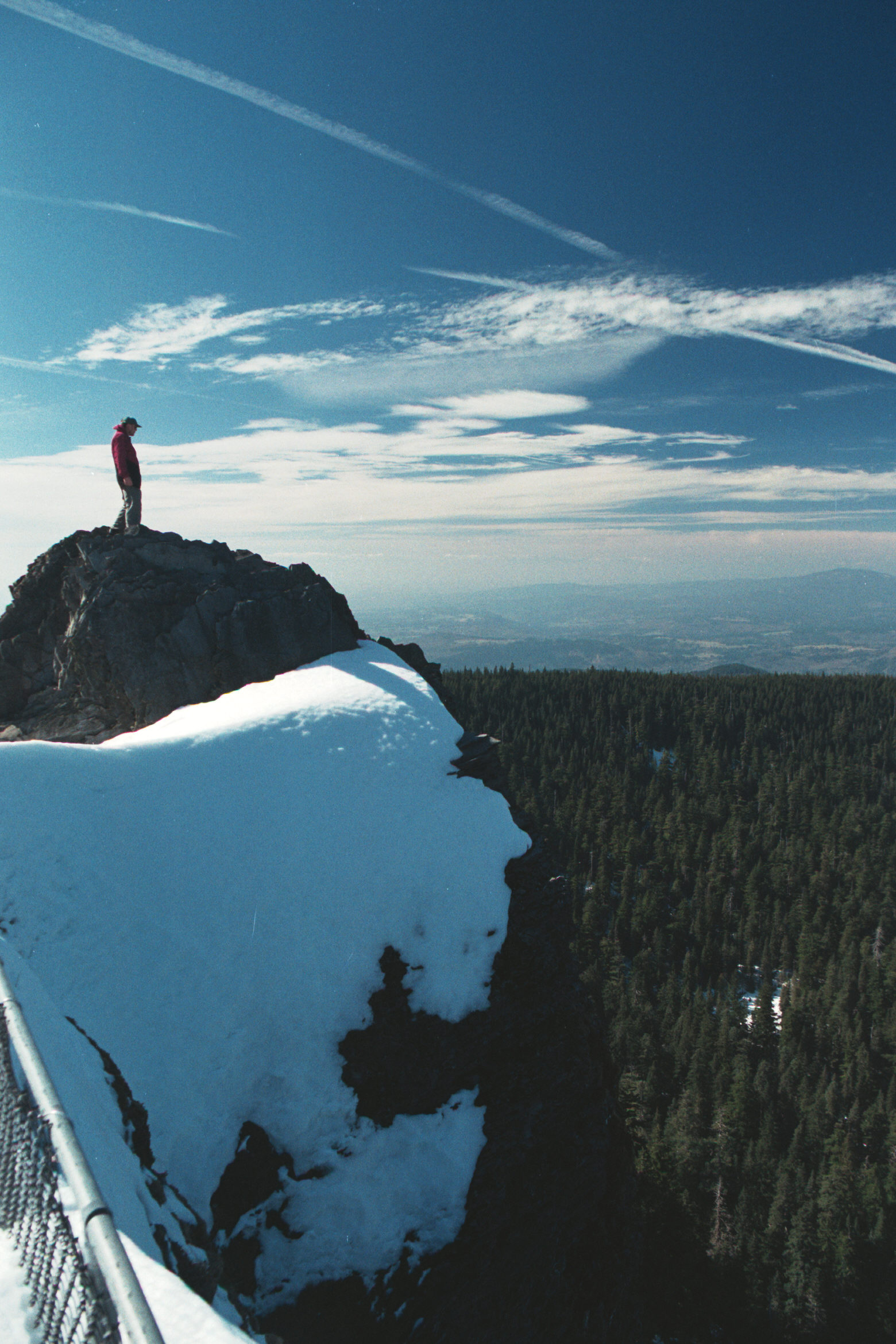
A hiker atop Larch Mountain, the highest elevation in the field

The Boring Lava deposits received their name based on their proximity to the town of Boring, which lies 12 miles (20 km) southeast of downtown Portland. The term "Boring Lava" is often used to refer to the local deposits erupted by vents in the field. They are located in the western portion of Oregon. The deposits were given this name by R. Treasher in 1942. In 2002, as geochemical and geochronological information on the Boring deposits accumulated, they were designated part of the larger Boring Lava Field. This grouping is somewhat informal and is based on similarities in age and lithology.

The Boring Lava deposits lie west of the town of Boring. The Global Volcanism Program lists the volcanic field's highest elevation as 4,055 feet (1,236 m), at Larch Mountain; most vents reach an elevation of 660 to 980 feet (200 to 300 m). Located in the Portland Basin, the field consists of monogenetic volcanic cones that appear as hills throughout the area, reaching heights of 650 feet (200 m) above their surroundings. The collection includes more than 80 small volcanic edifices and lava flows in the Portland–Vancouver metropolitan area, with the possibility of more volcanic deposits buried under sedimentary rock layers. The borders for the Boring Lava Field group are clear, except on the eastern side, where distinctions between Boring deposits and those from the major Cascade Volcanoes are less clear; many geologists have arbitrarily placed the eastern border at a longitude of 122 degrees west. In total, the Boring Lava Field covers an area of about 1,500 square miles (4,000 km^{2}), and it has a total volume of 2.4 cubic miles (10 km^{3}).

=== Physical geography ===
With a variable topography, the Portland area ranges from river valley floors to terraces reaching elevations of 400 feet (120 m). The Willamette Valley is marked by hills reaching heights of more than 1,000 feet (300 m), and it is also physically separated from the lower Columbia River valley. The Columbia River flows west from the eastern Portland region, merging with the Willamette near Portland before moving north. Tributaries for the Willamette include the Pudding, Molalla, Tualatin, Abernethy, and Clackamas rivers; tributaries for the Columbia River include the Washougal and Sandy rivers. The Columbia River has significantly shaped the geology of the area.

Multnomah Creek drains from Larch Mountain, one of the volcanic cones in Boring Lava Field. Local streams near the community of Boring receive seepage from the local aquifer. This aquifer, part of the greater Troutdale sandstone aquifer, is made of sandstone and conglomerate and supplies water to domestic wells in the Mount Norway area. Boring Lava is known to have formed intrusions into local sedimentary rock, and thus it may guide flow of groundwater locally.

=== Climate ===
Portland's climate is moderate, with long growing seasons, moderate rainfail, mild winters, and warm, dry summer seasons. The area has more than 200 frost-free days annually. Temperature can vary widely, reaching a historic maximum of 116 °F (47 °C), though the usual July maximum is below 80 °F (27 °C), and the average minimum for January is above 32 °F (0 °C). Yearly, precipitation averages between 35 and 45 inches (890 and 1,140 mm) in most river valleys, with a mean of 42.04 inches (1,068 mm) from 1871 through 1952. It shows variability, with a historic low of 26.11 inches (663 mm) at Portland in 1929 and a maximum of 67.24 inches (1,708 mm) in 1882. More than 75 percent of this precipitation occurs between October and March; July and August mark the driest months with means below 1 inch (25 mm), while November, December, and January represent the wettest with averages greater than 6 inches (150 mm). Prevailing winds originate from the south during winter and from the northwest during the summer season, with the exception of prevailing winds at the mouth of the Columbia River Gorge, where winds predominantly move to the east. The southern winds have the highest velocities of the three, only rarely occurring with potentially destructive force.

== Ecology ==
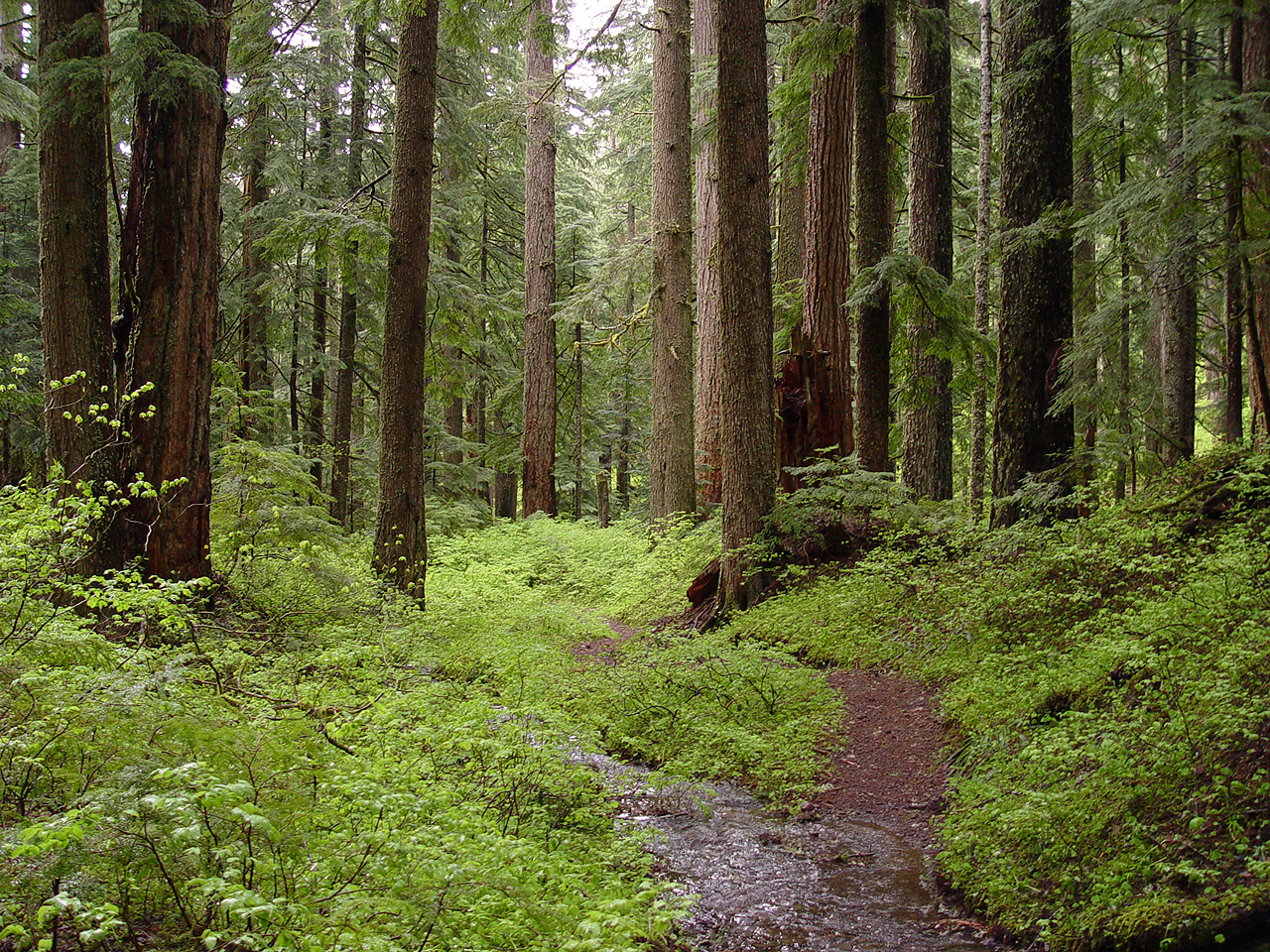
Old-growth forest at Larch Mountain

The Portland area has a moderate climate, and precipitation is not typically very heavy, allowing for significant growth of vegetation, which can hamper fieldwork in the area. Many forests that covered the area were partly cleared for agriculture, timber, or cemetery applications in the early 20th century. These cleared and burned land plots sustain rich stands of secondary forest, featuring gorse, huckleberry, nettles, poison oak, salal, and blackberry. Myriad species of fern, as well as rapid-growth deciduous trees like alder and vine maple are also frequent. Forests support stands of Douglas fir, western hemlock, western redcedar, Pacific dogwood, bigleaf maple, Oregon ash, red alder, cascara buckthorn, Pacific madrone, and Oregon white oak; within swamps and moist areas in creeks, the shrub Devil's club can be observed. Other trees that sometimes dominate forest areas include black cottonwood and red alder. Forest communities have many additional shrubs including Indian plum, western hazel, and snowberry. Ground layer plants include the herbaceous sword fern and stinging nettle.

In contemporary times, clearing of forests for housing development has left about half of the Boring Lava region un-forested. As a result, water quality has decreased due to higher sedimentation and turbidity, and flooding has worsened over time. Streams within the area are of either first or second order, with moderate to low flows and average gradients between 10 and 12 percent. Cool and clear, many sustain macroinvertebrates, and a smaller number support amphibians and fish. The riparian zones in the Lava Field area host diverse species, and they are influenced by uplands that serve as migration connections for birds, mammals, reptiles, and some amphibians.

The United States Fish and Wildlife Service provided a list of potentially threatened or endangered species in the Boring Lava area, labeling them "sensitive" species. Among plant species, they determined the following species to be sensitive: whitetop aster, golden Indian paintbrush, tall bugbane, pale larkspur, peacock larkspur, Willamette daisy, water howellia, Bradshaw's lomatium, Kincaid's lupine, Howell's montia, Nelson's checkermallow, and Oregon sullivantia. For animal and marine life, northwestern pond turtles, willow flycatchers, long-eared myotises, fringed myotises, long-legged myotises, Yuma myotises, Pacific western big-eared bats, and northern red-legged frogs have been identified as species of concern; pileated woodpeckers, bald eagles, cutthroat trout, and coho salmon are also considered sensitive.

== History ==
The nearby Portland area was inhabited by the Chinook people, though much of the local indigenous culture is poorly understood as a result of disturbance of archeological sites and artifacts by erosion and human development. Oral history, limited archeological evidence, and ethnographic research inform current knowledge about local Native American communities. The area surrounding Portland constituted one of the most densely populated communities in the Pacific Northwest, made up predominantly of Chinook people including the Multnomah and the Clackamas. In 1805 and 1806, Meriwether Lewis and William Clark documented villages and encampments near what is now East Portland, trading with members of the community and describing their plank houses, language, customs, and material culture. Chinookian villages married amongst themselves and with members of the Tualatin tribe as well as the coastal Tillamook people. They imported slaves, traded among villages, and acted as intermediaries for the English and American fur trade. They also developed skill as craftspeople in making clothing, baskets, tools, and architecture. Local indigenous populations were greatly reduced after forced displacement and disease, but a small Native American community persists in Multnomah County.

The Portland area has historically been a center for trade since the city was founded in 1845. With time, commerce has diversified. Iron mining and smelting was common between 1867 and 1894, with paper mills becoming established as an industry in 1885. Plants manufacturing cement and conducting aluminum reduction, and shipyards can be found in the region. Industrial chemical production represents an important industry in Portland. Most of these industries rely on resources outsourced from other areas, except for the paper industry; business is driven by low power costs and the local industrial mineral market. Other important manufacturing industries in the nearby region include food processing and logging.

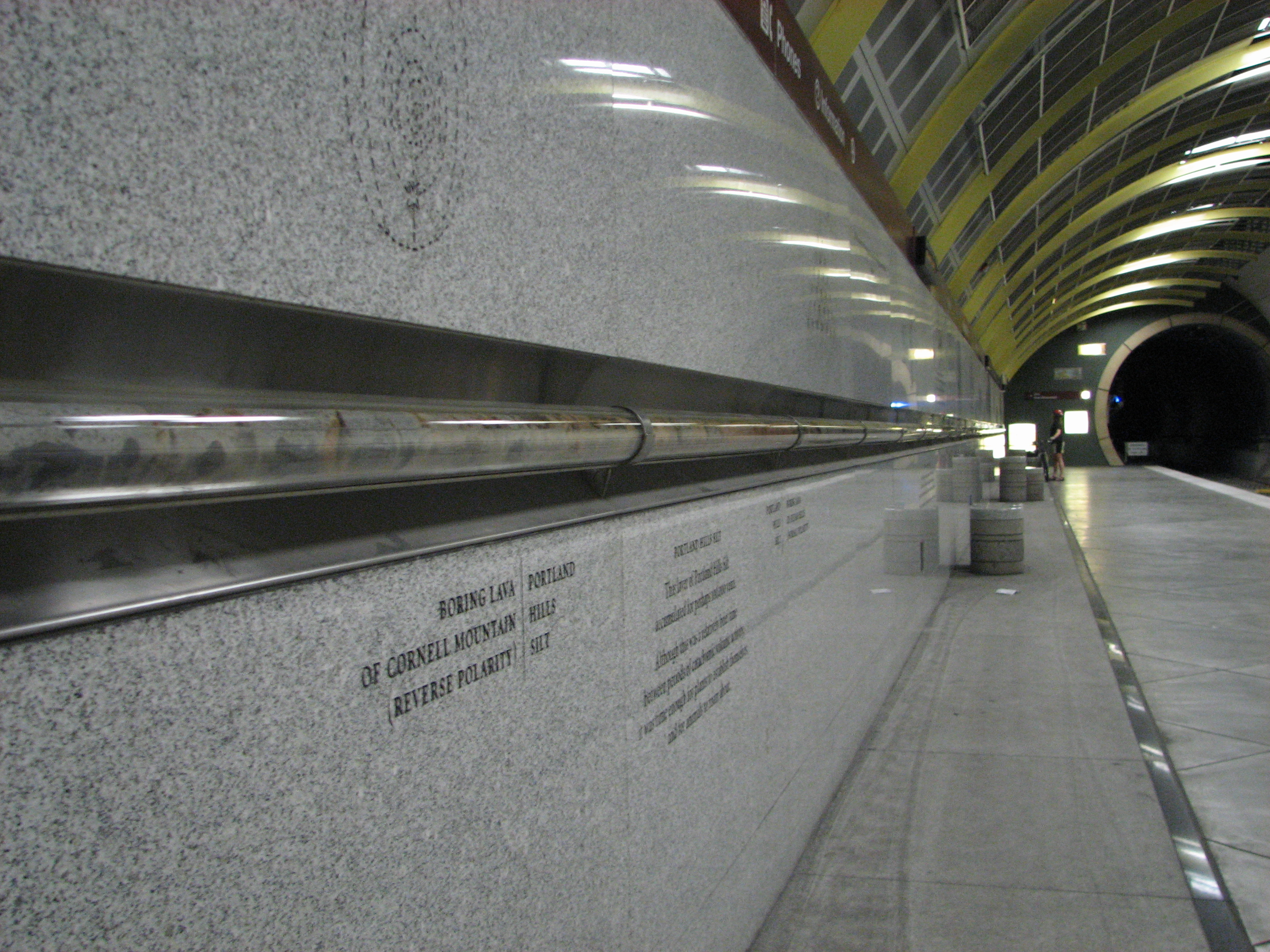
A core sample showing Portland's geological history, which includes Boring Lava Field deposits, is exhibited on the Washington Park station platform.

In 1893, the Kelly Butte Natural Area was designated upon a petition from the Portland City Council. Named after a pioneer family, the park covers an area of 22.63 acres (9.16 ha), including part of the Boring Lava Field, on public land 6 miles (9.7 km) to the southeast of downtown Portland, Historically, it sustained a quarry, prompting the creation of the Kelly Butte Jail, which used prisoner labor (under guard supervision) to gather crushed rocks for building roads in Portland until the 1950s. In general, rocks from the Boring Lava Field have been used for masonry projects including retaining walls, garden walls, and rock gardens, especially oxidized and scoriaceous rocks. Despite the prevalence of quarrying activity in historical times, there is no ongoing mineral or aggregate resource mining near the Boring Lava Field.

In 1952, after a local vote, the Kelly Butte Civil Defense Center was built between 1955 and 1956, costing about $670,000. The center was constructed to host local government agents should a nuclear attack on Portland occur; it had an area of 18,820 square feet (1,748 m^{2}), intended to host 250 people in case an emergency government became necessary. It was known throughout the United States as a model facility for local governments, and in 1957, the docudrama A Day Called X included footage of the Defense Center. The center was left obsolete after a 1963 Portland City Council vote to abolish it passed; in 1968, just one permanent employee remained. Eventually the building was converted into an emergency services dispatch center from 1974 through 1994, when it was abandoned due to rising costs for renovation and space limitations. That same year the building was vacated, and then it was sealed off in 2006. A sixty-bed isolation hospital operated at Kelly Butte from September 1920 until 1960, supporting patients with communicable disease. A 10 million-US-gallon (38 millionL) water tank stood in the area from 1968 through 2010, when it was replaced with a 25 million-US-gallon (95 millionL) underground reservoir that cost $100 million, despite opposition from local environmental groups like the Friends of the Reservoirs. Historically, the park has also housed a police firing range, and Kelly Butte remains a recreational space today, administered jointly by Portland Parks and Recreation and the Portland Water Board.

In 1981, the Portland city government built a reservoir at the north end of Powell Butte (part of the Boring Lava Field), which still serves the city. In 1987, Portland government created Powell Butte Nature Park, covering 600 acres (240 ha) of meadows and forest within the city. Planning started in 1995 for a second water reservoir in the area, which was built between 2011 and 2014. The new reservoir is underground, buried under topsoil and native plants, and it has a volume of 50 millionUS gallons (190 million L). With the new reservoir came improvements to the Powell Butte park, including resurfaced and realigned trails, reduced environmental impacts, better accessibility measures, and reduction of steep grades. The government also built a visitor center, caretaker's house, public restrooms, maintenance yard, and a permeable parking area that permitted filtration of rainwater through asphalt to an underground stone bed, where it could be absorbed by the soil and then into the nearest aquifer.

Built between 1993 and 1998, the Robertson Tunnel runs for 2.9 miles (4.7 km) through the Tualatin Mountains. It contains Washington Park station, the deepest train station in North America, located 260 feet (80 m) underground. The station displays a core that exhibits Boring Lava deposits. For the first 3,900 feet (1,200 m) of the tunnel, the core shows Boring lava flows with cinder, breccia, and loess dated from 1.47 million to 120,000 years ago, which have been deformed by the Sylvan fault. With the Oatfield fault, the Sylvan fault trends to the northwest, extending 9.3 miles (15 km) northwest and 16 miles (25 km) southeast of the tunnel. It is of Quaternary age and lacks surface expression, possibly as a result of its extensive burial by loess along its length.

In 2000, the nonprofit Friends of Mt. Tabor Park was formed to help maintain the Mount Tabor Park area, located 3.5 miles (5.6 km) east of downtown Portland. They have an organizational website and publish a bi-annual newsletter called the Tabor Times. Membership requires dues, and they also rely on donations and a gift shop for financial support.

In September 2017, the Hogan Butte Nature Park opened in the city of Gresham, encompassing an area of 46 acres (19 ha) that includes the extinct Boring Lava Field volcano Hogan Butte. This park opened after more than 25 years of processing, supported by a 1990 bond from the city and two regional Metro bonds. Collaborators for opening the park include the U.S. Forest Service, local citizens, Metro, The Trust for Public Land, and the Buttes Conservancy organization. Gresham is one of just a few places in the United States with volcanoes contained in its city limits. Mount Sylvania and Mount Scott lie within the limits of Portland, in the southwestern and southeastern parts of the city, respectively.

== Geology ==
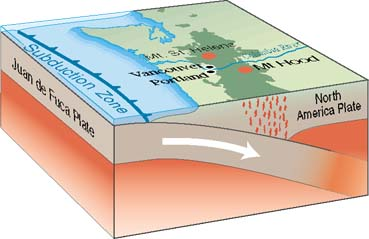
Volcanism in the Boring Lava Field results from subduction of the oceanic Juan de Fuca tectonic plate under the North American tectonic plate.

There are 90 volcanic centers^{[a]} within a 20-mile (32 km) radius of Troutdale and more than 32 vents within a 13-mile (21 km) radius of Kelly Butte. Mostly small cinder cone vents, these volcanoes also include some larger lava domes from shield volcanoes at Mount Sylvania, Highland Butte, and Larch Mountain. The Boring Lava Field marks the densest volcanic vicinity in this group, encompassing an area of 36 square miles (93 km^{2}). It includes more than 80 known small vents and associated lava flows, with more volcanic deposits likely present under sedimentary rock deposits from the Missoula Floods (also known as the Bretz or Ice Age Floods), which took place between 21,000 and 15,000 years ago and probably destroyed small cinder cones (including those made from tuff) and maar craters, burying them under up to 98 feet (30 m) of silt from slack water. The Global Volcanism Program reports that the field includes somewhere between 32 and 50 shield volcanoes and cinder cones, with many vents concentrated northwest of the town of Boring.

=== Regional setting ===
Considered an outlier of the Cascade Range, the Boring Lava Field lies about 62 miles (100 km) to the west of the major Cascade crest. It marks one of five volcanic fields along the Quaternary Cascade arc, along with Indian Heaven, Tumalo in Oregon, the Mount Bachelor chain, and Caribou in California. Like the Cascade Range, the Boring field was also generated by subduction of the oceanic Juan de Fuca tectonic plate under the North American tectonic plate, but it has a different tectonic position, with its eruptive activity more likely related to tectonic rifting throughout the region. The Boring Lava Field has erupted material derived from hot mantle magma, and the subducting Juan de Fuca plate may be as shallow as 50 miles (80 km) in depth at their location.

The High Cascades, a segment of the Cascade volcanic arc that includes the Boring Lava Field, is characterized by basaltic lava flows with andesite, tuff breccia, and volcanic ash. The High Cascades may lie over a graben (a depressed block of the Earth's crust bordered by parallel faults), and activity at the Boring field and throughout the Portland area may be associated with deformation of the block. Portland lies within the Portland Basin, part of the forearc (the region between an oceanic trench and the associated volcanic arc) between the Cascades major arc and the Pacific Coast Ranges, which consist of Eocene to Miocene marine sedimentary rock deposits and Eocene intrusions and extrusions of basalt that were emplaced on the Siletz terrane. The eastern boundary for the Portland Basin is the Cascades, while the Tualatin Mountains lie to the west, along an anticline formation that has been changing since the Miocene. The Boring Lava Field sits on the floor of the Portland Basin, residing in the forearc setting between tectonic extension to the south and compression to the north. The uneven distribution of vents within this forearc suggests a local zone of crustal expansion. Over the last 2.7 million years, the volcanic field has irregularly rotated clockwise and migrated to the northwest at an average rate of 0.37 inches (9.3 mm) ± 0.063 inches (1.6 mm) per year relative to the surrounding crust. This northwest trending is consistent with other faults in the nearby area. The Boring Lava Field represents the youngest episode of volcanism within the Cascade forearc, and while there is no evidence that they were associated with a slab window (a gap that forms in a subducted oceanic plate when a mid-ocean ridge meets with a subduction zone and plate divergence at the ridge and convergence at the subduction zone continue, causing the ridge to be subducted), they likely interacted with the regional mantle wedge.

=== Composition and local setting ===
The Boring Lava Field shows a similar composition to the High Cascades that run through Oregon and southern Washington state, with Pliocene to Pleistocene basalt lava flows and breccias. It was active during the late Tertiary into the early Quaternary. Within the field, lava shows a diverse composition overall, varying from low-K,^{[b]} tholeiitic to high-K, calc-alkaline eruptive products. Some of the low-K tholeiite deposits likely originated from vents closer to the High Cascades, and they are overlain by Boring Lava materials. J. M. Shempert, a geologist at Portland State University, proposed that mantle sources for the two different lava types may be different and that the calc-alkaline sources are more refractory.^{[c]}

Like the surrounding High Cascades, Boring Lava Field erupted lava made of olivine basalt and basaltic andesite; these sub-alkaline basalts and basaltic andesite predominate among Boring Lava deposits. The olivine basalt deposits have fine to medium textures, and the basaltic andesite lava flow deposits have relatively little pyroclastic rock in them, suggesting that explosive eruptions were uncommon within the field. Dark gray to light gray in color, Boring Lava produces columnar and platy joints, which can be seen in Oregon east of Portland and in Clark County in Washington state. It is usually phyric, though one sample from Rocky Butte consists of labradorite with olivine phenocrysts that have been transformed to iddingsite. The Boring Lava reaches thicknesses of more than 400 feet (120 m). Boring Lava has a more mafic (rich in magnesium in iron) composition than the nearby volcano Mount Hood, but they are similar in age. There is a small amount of andesite in the lavas from the field, mostly erupted from monogenetic vents or Larch Mountain. Sometimes, Boring Lava overlaps with volcaniclastic conglomerate from other Cascade eruptions in Multnomah County and the northern part of Clackamas County. The Boring Lava also contains tuff, cinder, and scoria; it is characterized by plagioclase laths that show a pilotaxitic texture with spaces between them that show a diktytaxitic texture. The Boring Lava exposures show aeromagnetic anomalies with short wavelengths and high amplitudes suggestive of their relatively young geological ages.

At points where the Boring Lava sits over Troutdale Formation deposits, landslides are frequent, producing steep head scarps with heights of up to 66 feet (20 m). These scarps tend to have grabens at their bases and Boring Lava blocks at their tops, and they show variable slide surfaces from hummocky to flat. A number of these exposures show dips up to 35 degrees, as well as minor faults. The landslides range in thickness from 20 to 79 feet (6 to 24 m). Portland's wet climate leads to weathering, which at the Boring Lava Field has reached depths of up to 25 feet (7.6 m), altering the upper 5 to 15 feet (1.5 to 4.6 m) of soil to a red, clay-like material. At the cinder cone in Mount Tabor Park, an outcrop of quartzite-pebble xenoliths (rock fragments enveloped in a larger rock during the latter's development and solidification) can be observed among local cinder specimens, dating from Miocene to Pliocene Troutdale deposits. While the volcanic rock of Boring Lava was being emplaced over rock from the Troutdale formation, there was deformation that uplifted and dropped fault blocks to the southeast of Portland. Along the Washougal River, a large landslide occurred as a result of failure due to the Boring Lava pushing down on rock from the Troutdale formation. Intrusions of Boring Lava formed outcrops at Highland Butte, La Butte, and potentially in the subsurface regions near Aurora and Curtis, and these intrusions have been associated with normal faulting at Parrett and Petes Mountain, Aurora, Curtis, and Swan Island (along the Molalla River). Faults together with igneous intrusions are usually accompanied by stretching and doming as a result of magma influxes or collapses from the evacuation of the magma flows. Similarly, faults north of Oregon City might have resulted from subsidence after magma chambers emptied or lava was extruded as a result of Boring Lava eruptions. Some of the Boring Lava vents cut off hydrogeologic units in the surrounding area.

Eruptive vents on the western edge of the field formed along a fault line that trended to the northeast, located north of present-day Carver. Boring Lava was erupted by vents in the volcanic field, and it has been exposed at elevated topographic levels in intact volcanic cones and dissected lava plains. There is likely more lava deposited under Quaternary sedimentary mantle throughout the region, though activity was confined to a relatively concentrated area.

=== Subfeatures ===
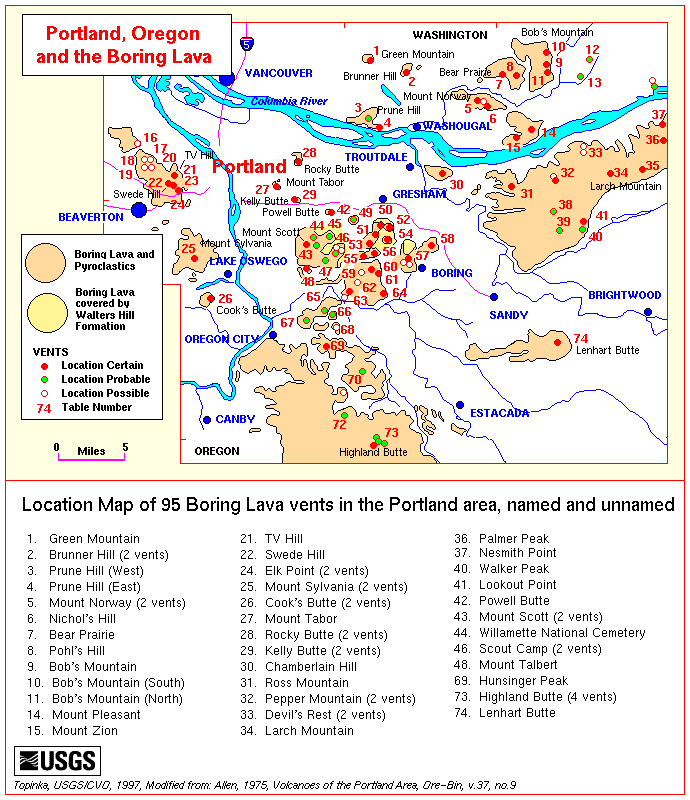

D. E. Trimble (1963) argued that the Boring Lava Field was produced by eruptive activity at 30 volcanic centers; these include shield and cinder cone volcanoes. J. E. Allen reported 95 vents in 1975, dividing them into four clusters: 17 vents north of the Columbia River, 14 vents west of the Willamette River, 19 vents east of the Willamette River and north of Powell Valley Road, and 45 vents east of the Willamette River and south of Powell Valley Road (Highway 26). Of these, 42 were unnamed, and several volcanoes contained multiple vents. Generally, all lava flows in the field can be traced to specific vents in the field, but documented source vents have mostly been confirmed through chemical analysis or petrographic comparisons, with a few exceptions.

In the eastern part of the Boring cluster, volcanic vents have average diameters less than 1.6 miles (2.6 km), with average heights less than 1,090 feet (330 m) from base to summit. The lava flows from Highland Butte and Larch Mountain, both shield volcanoes, encompass a wide area, the Boring Lava deposits averaging thicknesses of 100 to 200 feet (30 to 61 m) not considering areas next to volcanic cones in the field. Most of the summit craters have been destroyed, though there are partial craters at Bobs Hill (located 20.5 miles (33.0 km) northeast of Portland) and Battle Ground Lake (located 20.5 miles (33.0 km) north of Portland); Mount Scott also has an intact summit crater. Many of its vents retain the shape of a volcanic cone, with loess extending above an elevation of 400 feet (120 m). The Rocky Butte plug, which reaches a height of 330 feet (100 m) above its surroundings, was dated to 125,000 ± 40,000 years old by R. Evarts and B. Fleck from the United States Geological Survey (USGS). Mount Tabor is also prominent in the area, dated by the USGS to 203,000 ± 5,000 years old, as are Kelly Butte, Powell Butte, and Mount Scott. Scott has been dated to 1.6 million years ago.

A series of lava tubes were documented near the Catlin Gabel School along the western slope of the Portland Hills. These formations, created by lava flows cooling at the surface while their hot interior kept draining, were first identified by R. J. Deacon in 1968, then analyzed by L. R. Squier in 1970; they were studied in greater detail by J. E. Allen and his team in 1974. The Catlin Gabel tubes lie among cinder cones and lava flows from the Pliocene to Pleistocene, and they are the oldest known lava tubes in Oregon, older than the Holocene. The tubes were produced by a small vent at the southern end of the northern segment of the field, extending 2.5 miles (4.0 km) from its base to the south and then the west. They originated from the uppermost lava flow from a series of eruptions that ran into a valley on the western slope of the Portland Hills. The Catlin Gabel tubes have a width of 2,500 feet (760 m), with slopes averaging 150 feet (46 m) per mile for an average grade of 3 percent. On average, these tubes have a thickness of 235 feet (72 m) near their center, with an upper lava unit thickness of 90 feet (27 m) that has since been modified by erosion and the deposition of up to 30 feet (9.1 m) of Portland Hills silt. The Catlin Gabel tubes also sit atop 434 feet (132 m) of silt from the Troutdale Formation. Running along the tube's arc are five depressions, which were created through the collapsing roofs of the lava tubes within a subsegment that is 6,000 feet (1,800 m) in length. The characteristics of the tube system are not well documented, since only the collapsed segments are accessible. Some of the channels have been reduced to rubble, and analysis has revealed that they trended northwest, had widths up to 40 feet (12 m) and depths no more than 60 feet (18 m), and required special engineering procedures to permit the construction of a 15-story building above them.

=== Oregon vents ===
The following vents are in Oregon:

Boring Lava Field Vents in Oregon
| Name | Elevation | Notes |
|---|---|---|
| Chamberlain Hill | 890 feet (271 m) | |
| Cook's Butte | 718 feet (219 m) | |
| Highland Butte | 1,594 feet (486 m) | |
| Kelly Butte | 400 feet (122 m) | |
| Larch Mountain | 4,061 feet (1,238 m) | |
| Powell Butte | 614 feet (187 m) | |
| Rocky Butte | 612 feet (187 m) | |
| Ross Mountain | 1,380 feet (421 m) | |
| Swede Hill | 995 feet (303 m) | |
| Mount Scott | 1,093 feet (333 m) | Named for Harvey W. Scott |
| Mount Sylvania | 978 feet (298 m) | |
| Mount Tabor | 630 feet (192 m) | |
| Mount Talbert | 715 feet (218 m) | |
| TV Hill | 1,275 feet (389 m) | |
| Walker Peak | 2,450 feet (747 m) | |

=== Washington vents ===
The following vents are in Washington:

Boring Lava Field Vents in Washington
| Name | Elevation | Notes |
|---|---|---|
| Battle Ground Lake | 509 feet (155 m) | |
| Bob's Mountain | 2,110 feet (643 m) | |
| Bob's Mountain (N) | 1,775 feet (541 m) | |
| Bob's Mountain (S) | 1,690 feet (515 m) | |
| Brunner Hill | 680 feet (207 m) | 2 vents |
| Green Mountain | 804 feet (245 m) | |
| Mount Norway | 1,111 feet (339 m) | |
| Mount Pleasant | 1,010 feet (308 m) | |
| Mount Zion | 1,465 feet (447 m) | |
| Nichol's Hill | 1,113 feet (339 m) | |
| Pohl's Hill | 1,395 feet (425 m) | |
| Prune Hill (E) | 610 feet (186 m) | |
| Prune Hill (W) | 555 feet (169 m) | |
| Tum-Tum Mountain | 1,400 feet (427 m) | |

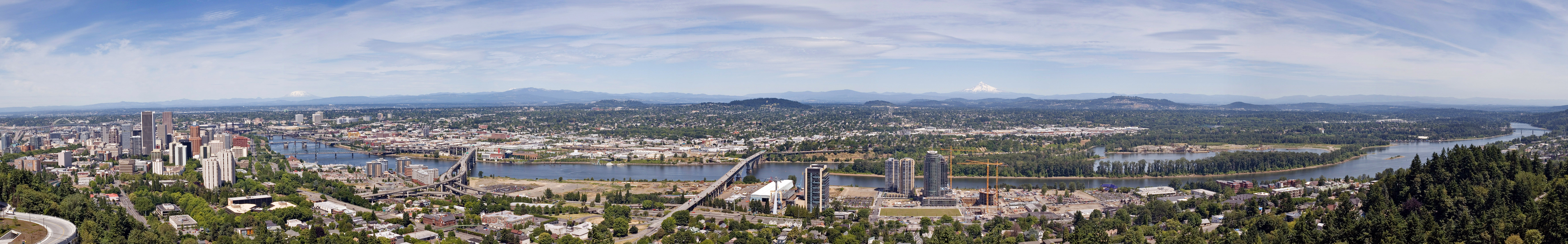
The buttes of the Boring Lava Field are visible toward the center of this panorama of Portland, Oregon.

== Eruptive history ==
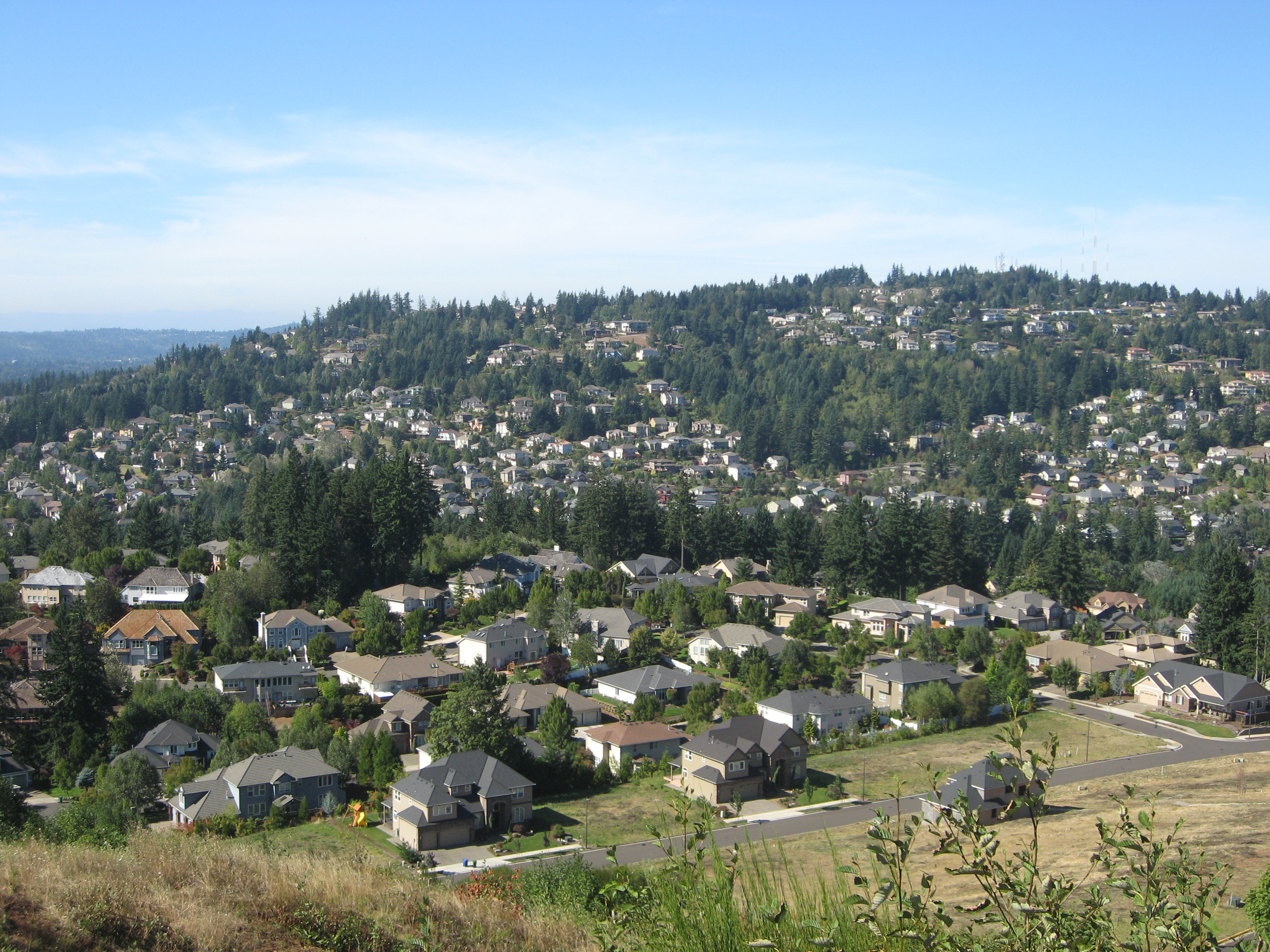
Eruptions took place in areas that are now populated, such as this community on Mount Scott.

Eruptions at Boring Lava Field occur in a concentrated manner, often in clusters of three to six vents, as at Bobs Mountain and Portland Hills. These types of vents typically produced similar types of magma in relatively short periods of time, and they also frequently show alignment. Vents in the field have generally produced basalt and basaltic andesite, with some andesitic eruptions, including those that produced the Larch Mountain shield volcano.

Prior to the 1990s, there was little potassium-argon dating data available for the lava field, and despite the field's proximity to an urban area, little was known about its composition until recent years. Weathering, fine grain size, and glassy content further limit argon–argon dating for the field. Recent argon–argon dating suggests that eruptive activity at the Boring Lava Field began between 2.6 and 2.4 million years ago, yielding far-reaching basalt lava flows, the Highland Butte shield volcano, a number of monogenetic vents, and one andesitic lava flow. These took place near the southern Portland Basin, and were followed by about 750,000 years of quiescence. About 1.6 million years ago, eruptive activity resumed to the north of the previously active area, with alkalic basalt lava flows generating the Mount Scott shield volcano. As eruptions shifted to the east over time, the Larch Mountain volcano was produced by eruptions in the foothills of the Cascade Range. Activity spread out over the area, extending to its current expansive state about one million years ago. In addition to spreading out geographically, the lava composition in the field's vents became more diverse. This period continued until about 500,000 years ago, with no activity until about 350,000 years ago, after which activity continued through roughly 60,000 to 50,000 years ago according to several sources, or about 120,000 years ago according to I. P. Madin (2009). R. Evarts and Fleck originally reported that lava flows at the Barnes Road deposit of the field represented the youngest eruptive products in the Boring area, with a radiometric dating age of 105,000 ± 6,000 years. These eruptions followed a relatively even age distribution over time; younger vents and associated deposits lie in the northern portion of the field, while older deposits are confined to the south.

The products of the Boring Lava Field were erupted discontinuously over an erosion surface. Activity took place during the late Tertiary and early Quaternary, in what is now the Portland area as well as the surrounding area, with a particularly concentrated pocket of activity to the east. Nearly all of these eruptions were confined to single vents or small vent complexes, with the exception of a lava plain southeast of present-day Oregon City. Boring Lava generally consists of flowing lava; only one eruptive deposit contains tuff, ash, and tuff breccia, and one vent to the northeast of the Carver area displayed evidence of explosive eruptions that later became effusive.

=== Recent activity and current threats ===
Sometime less than 100,000 years ago, magma at Battle Ground Lake in Washington state interacted with water to form the eponymous maar volcano, destroying a lava flow dated to 100,000 years ago. The last volcanic center to form in the field was Beacon Rock, a cinder cone produced by eruptions about 57,000 years ago, which was eroded by the Missoula Floods to leave only its central volcanic plug. While the known volcanic vents in the Boring Lava Field are extinct, the field itself is not considered extinct. The probability of future eruptions in the Portland–Vancouver metropolitan area is very low. It is rare that more than 50,000 years pass without an eruption in the region; given the past eruptive history of the field, an eruption is predicted to occur once every 15,000 years on average.

About half of the Boring Lava Field eruptions took place in what are today densely populated areas of the Portland–Vancouver metropolitan area. Though the formation of a small cinder cone vent might not extend far beyond its surroundings, depending on location, similar eruptions could lead to deposition of volcanic ash that could lead to serious infrastructural consequences, covering large areas. A larger eruption, like the ones that built Larch Mountain or Mount Sylvania, could span years to decades. It is unclear where exactly a future eruption might take place, but it would probably occur in the northern portion of the field.

Many seismic faults in the northeastern section of the northern Willamette Valley formed as a result of intrusions of Boring Lava, as supported by their orientation, lengths, displacements, age, and proximity to Boring Lava intrusions. Though intrusions from any future eruptions at the Boring field are "probably minimal", Boring Lava might play a role in determining the intensity of ground shaking during future earthquakes in the area.

== Recreation ==
Trails in the city of Gresham travel over parts of the Boring Lava Field and its cones. Mount Tabor and Powell Butte are better known for their recreational uses than other cones; Powell Butte Nature Park has 9 miles (14 km) of trails. The Mt. Tabor Park is open to bicyclists and pedestrians from 5 a.m. through midnight and to motorized vehicles from 5 a.m. through 10 p.m. each day, except for Wednesdays when the park roads are not open to automobiles. The Hogan Butte Nature Park offers views of Mount Adams, Mount Hood, Mount Rainier, and Mount St. Helens, as well as running trails and sites for picnicking.

In addition to the nature park on Hogan Butte, a number of smaller cinder cones are also publicly accessible. The Gresham Saddle Trail traverses Gresham Butte and Gabbert Butte, running for 3.3 to 3.7 miles (5.3 to 6.0 km). The trail is considered to be of moderate difficulty, and it offers no amenities. It includes the Gabbert Loop Trail, which extends for 1 mile (1.6 km) through forests of maples, alders, ferns, and firs.

== See also ==
- List of volcanic fields

== Notes ==
- [a] Evarts et al. (2009) list only 80 centers but acknowledge there are likely more buried vents; Le Corvec et al. (2013) list 88 volcanic centers at Boring Lava Field.
- [b] Low-K is a geological term used to describe lava with low amounts of potassium, while high-K describes lava enriched in potassium.
- [c] Refractory refers to any material that does not easily convert from liquid to gas via the process of vaporization, which includes elements and compounds made from metals.

== Sources ==
- Allen, J. E. (September 1974). "The Catlin Gabel Lava Tubes" (PDF). The Ore Bin. 36 (9). Oregon Department of Geology and Mineral Industries. Archived (PDF) from the original on March 15, 2017.
- Allen, J. E. (September 1975). "Volcanoes of the Portland Area, Oregon". The Ore Bin. 37 (9). Oregon Department of Geology and Mineral Industries. Archived from the original on August 25, 2018.
- Anderson, Susan, ed. (2009). East Portland Historical Overview & Historic Preservation Study (Report). City of Portland Bureau of Planning and Sustainability. Archived from the original on January 1, 2016.
- Blakely, R. J.; Wells, R. E.; Yelin, T. S.; Madin, I. P.; Beeson, M. H. (September 1995). "Tectonic setting of the Portland-Vancouver area, Oregon and Washington: Constraints from low-altitude aeromagnetic data". Geological Society of America Bulletin. 107 (9). Geological Society of America: 1051–1062. Bibcode:1995GSAB..107.1051B. doi:10.1130/0016-7606(1995)107<1051:TSOTPV>2.3.CO;2.
- Boring Lava Domes: Supplement To The Johnson Creek Basin Protection Plan And Minor Amendments to Environmental Regulations (Report). Portland Bureau of Planning. November 1997. OCLC 702299177. Archived from the original on September 18, 2016.
- Chan, C. F.; Tepper, J. H.; Nelson, B. K. (July 2012). "Petrology of the Grays River volcanics, southwest Washington: Plume-influenced slab window magmatism in the Cascadia forearc". GSA Bulletin. 124 (7–8). Geological Society of America: 1324–1338. Bibcode:2012GSAB..124.1324C. doi:10.1130/B30576.1.
- Conrey, R. M.; Leeman, W. P.; Streck, M. J.; Evarts, R. C. (December 2003). The Boring Volcanic Field of the Portland Basin: Diverse Primitive Mafic Magmas Erupted in a Frontal Arc Setting. AGU Fall Meeting Abstracts. Vol. 2003. American Geophysical Union. pp. V31E–0981. Bibcode:2003AGUFM.V31E0981C.
- Conrey, R. M.; Uto, K.; Uchiumi, S.; Beeson, M. H.; Madin, I. P.; Tolan, T. L.; Swanson, D. A. (November 1996). "Potassium-argon ages of Boring Lava, northwest Oregon and southwest Washington". Isochron/West (63). Nevada Bureau of Mines and Geology: 3–9.
- Dougall, J. A. (August 2007). Downstream Effects of Glaciers on Stream Water Quality (Thesis). Portland State University.
- Evarts, R. C.; Conrey, R. M.; Fleck, R. J.; Hagstrum, J. T. (January 2009). O'Connor, J. E.; Dorsey, R. J.; Madin, I. P. (eds.). The Boring Volcanic Field of the Portland-Vancouver area, Oregon and Washington: Tectonically anomalous forearc volcanism in an urban setting. Volcanoes to Vineyards: Geologic Field Trips Through the Dynamic Landscape of the Pacific Northwest (Report). Geological Society of America. pp. 253–270. doi:10.1130/2009.fld015(13). ISBN 978-0-8137-5615-8. Geological Society of America Field Guide 15.
- Fleck, R. J.; Evarts, R. C.; Hagstrum, J. T.; Valentine, M. J. (May 2002). "The Boring Volcanic Field of the Portland, Oregon Area: Geochronology and Neotectonic Significance". Programs with Aspects: Geological Society of America. Geological Society of America. Archived from the original on December 4, 2008.
- Fleck, R. J.; Hagstrum, J. T.; Calvert, A. T.; Evarts, R. C.; Conrey, R. M. (December 2014). "40Ar/39Ar geochronology, paleomagnetism, and evolution of the Boring volcanic field, Oregon and Washington, USA". Geosphere. 10 (6). Geological Society of America: 1283–1314. Bibcode:2014Geosp..10.1283F. doi:10.1130/GES00985.1.
- Hagstrum, J. T.; Fleck, R. J.; Evarts, R. C.; Calvert, A. T. (January 2017). "Paleomagnetism and 40Ar/39Ar geochronology of the Plio-Pleistocene Boring Volcanic Field: Implications for the geomagnetic polarity time scale and paleosecular variation". Physics of the Earth and Planetary Interiors. 262. Elsevier: 101–115. Bibcode:2017PEPI..262..101H. doi:10.1016/j.pepi.2016.07.008.
- Hartford, S. V.; McFarland, W. D. (1989). Lithology, thickness, and extent of hydrogeologic units underlying the East Portland area, Oregon (PDF) (Report). United States Geological Survey. ASIN B0001030NS. OCLC 31507910. Water-Resources Investigations Report 88-4110. Archived (PDF) from the original on May 1, 2019.
- Hildreth, W. (2007). Quaternary Magmatism in the Cascades – Geologic Perspectives (PDF) (Report). United States Geological Survey. doi:10.3133/wri884110. OCLC 182746810. Professional Paper 1744. Archived (PDF) from the original on January 31, 2021.
- Le Corvec, N.; Spörli, K. B.; Rowland, J.; Lindsay, J. (September 2013). "Spatial distribution and alignments of volcanic centers: Clues to the formation of monogenetic volcanic fields". Earth-Science Reviews. 124. Elsevier: 96–114. Bibcode:2013ESRv..124...96L. doi:10.1016/j.earscirev.2013.05.005.
- Lhuillier, F.; Shcherbakov, V. P.; Gilder, S. A.; Hagstrum, J. T. (July 2017). "Variability of the 0–3 Ma palaeomagnetic field observed from the Boring Volcanic Field of the Pacific Northwest". Geophysical Journal International. 211 (1). Oxford University Press: 69–79. Bibcode:2017GeoJI.211...69L. doi:10.1093/gji/ggx288.
- Lowry, W. D.; Baldwin, E. M. (January 1952). "Late Cenozoic Geology of the Lower Columbia River Valley, Oregon and Washington". GSA Bulletin. 63 (1). Geological Society of America: 1–24. Bibcode:1952GSAB...63....1L. doi:10.1130/0016-7606(1952)63[1:LCGOTL]2.0.CO;2.
- Madin, I. P. (2009a). "Portland, Oregon, geology by tram, train, and foot" (PDF). The Ore Bin. 69 (1). Oregon Department of Geology and Mineral Industries: 73–92. Archived (PDF) from the original on October 30, 2020.
- Madin, I. P. (2009b). Geologic Map 119, Geologic Map of the Oregon City 7.5' quadrangle, Clackamas County, Oregon (PDF) (Report). Oregon Department of Geology and Mineral Industries. pp. 1–46. OCLC 502019232. Archived (PDF) from the original on October 5, 2018.
- Norman, D. K.; Roloff, J. M. (March 2004). A self-guided tour of the geology of the Columbia River Gorge – Portland Airport to Skamania Lodge, Stevenson, Washington (PDF) (Report). Washington Division of Geology and Earth Resources. OCLC 74466975. Archived (PDF) from the original on January 31, 2017.
- Shempert, J. M.; Streck, M. J.; Leeman, W. P. (October 2009). "Olivine and Spinel Systematics of Boring Volcanic Field (BVF) Basalts: Evidence for Magma Source Variations and Interaction Among Basaltic Magmas". Geological Society of America Abstracts with Programs. 41 (7). Geological Society of America: 310. Archived from the original on October 11, 2018.
- Siebert, L.; Simkin, T.; Kimberly, P. (2011). Volcanoes of the World (3 ed.). University of California Press. ISBN 978-0-520-26877-7.
- Swanson, R. D. (1986). A stratigraphic-geochemical study of the Troutdale Formation and Sandy River Mudstone in the Portland basin and lower Columbia River Gorge (Thesis). Portland State University. doi:10.15760/etd.5604. Archived from the original on October 11, 2018.
- Swanson, R. D.; McFarland, W. D.; Gonthier, J. B.; Wilkinson, J. M. (1993). A description of hydrogeologic units in the Portland Basin, Oregon and Washington (Report). United States Geological Survey. doi:10.3133/wri904196. OCLC 974647668. Archived from the original on August 16, 2018.
- Treacher, R. C. (1942). Geologic History of the Portland Area: DOGAMI Short Paper 7 (Report). Oregon Department of Geology and Mineral Industries.
- Trimble, D. E. (1963). Geology of Portland, Oregon, and adjacent areas: Bulletin 1119 (Report). United States Geological Survey. doi:10.3133/b1119. OCLC 793416650. Archived from the original on August 16, 2018.
- Werner, K. S. (1991). Direction of maximum horizontal compression in western Oregon determined by borehole breakouts. Structure and tectonics of the northern Willamette Valley, Oregon (Thesis). Oregon State University. Archived from the original on September 26, 2020.
- Wood, C. A.; Kienle, J. (1990). Volcanoes of North America. Cambridge University Press. ISBN 978-0-521-43811-7.
