= William E. Brainard House =

Historic building in Portland, Oregon, U.S.

- U.S. National Register of Historic Places
- Portland Historic Landmark
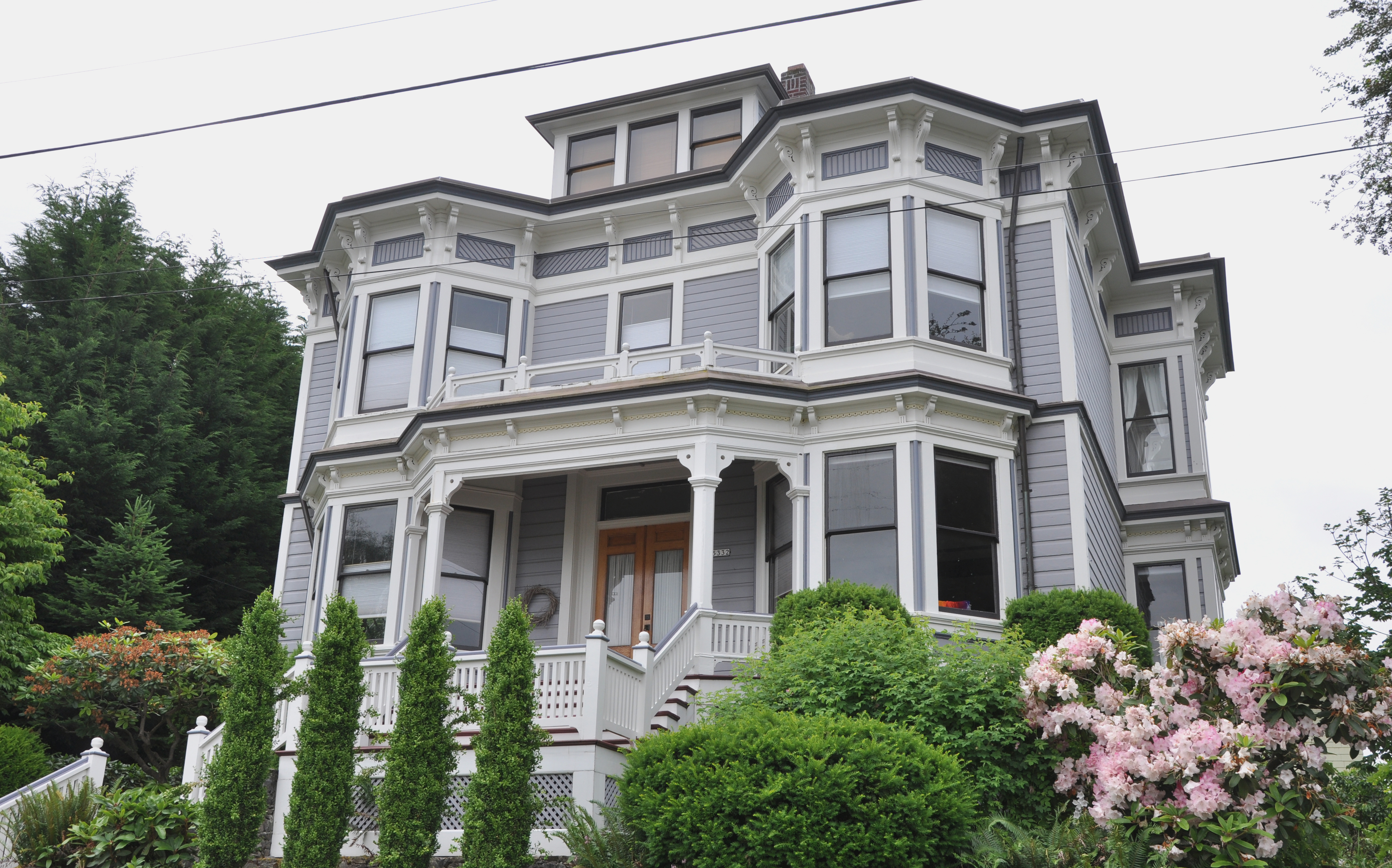
- The house's exterior in 2011
- Location: 5332 SE Morrison Street, Portland, Oregon
- Coordinates: 45°31′02″N 122°36′29″W
- Area: Less than 1 acre (0.40 ha)
- Built: 1888
- Architectural style: Italianate
- Restored: 1970s
- NRHP reference No.: 79002128
- Added to NRHP: March 1, 1979

The William E. Brainard House is a historic house in Portland, Oregon, United States. The Mount Tabor neighborhood was one of Portland's prestigious residential districts in the late 19th century, and this 1888 Italianate structure is one of the few stately homes remaining from that period. It was occupied by a series of residents prominent in business, including farmer, real estate investor, and banker William E. Brainard; stock broker and investment banker George W. Davis; and dentist and dental supplier John C. Welch.

The house was added to the National Register of Historic Places in 1979.

== See also ==
- National Register of Historic Places listings in Southeast Portland, Oregon
