= John and Sarah Sheffield House =

Historic building in Portland, Oregon, U.S.

- U.S. National Register of Historic Places
- Portland Historic Landmark
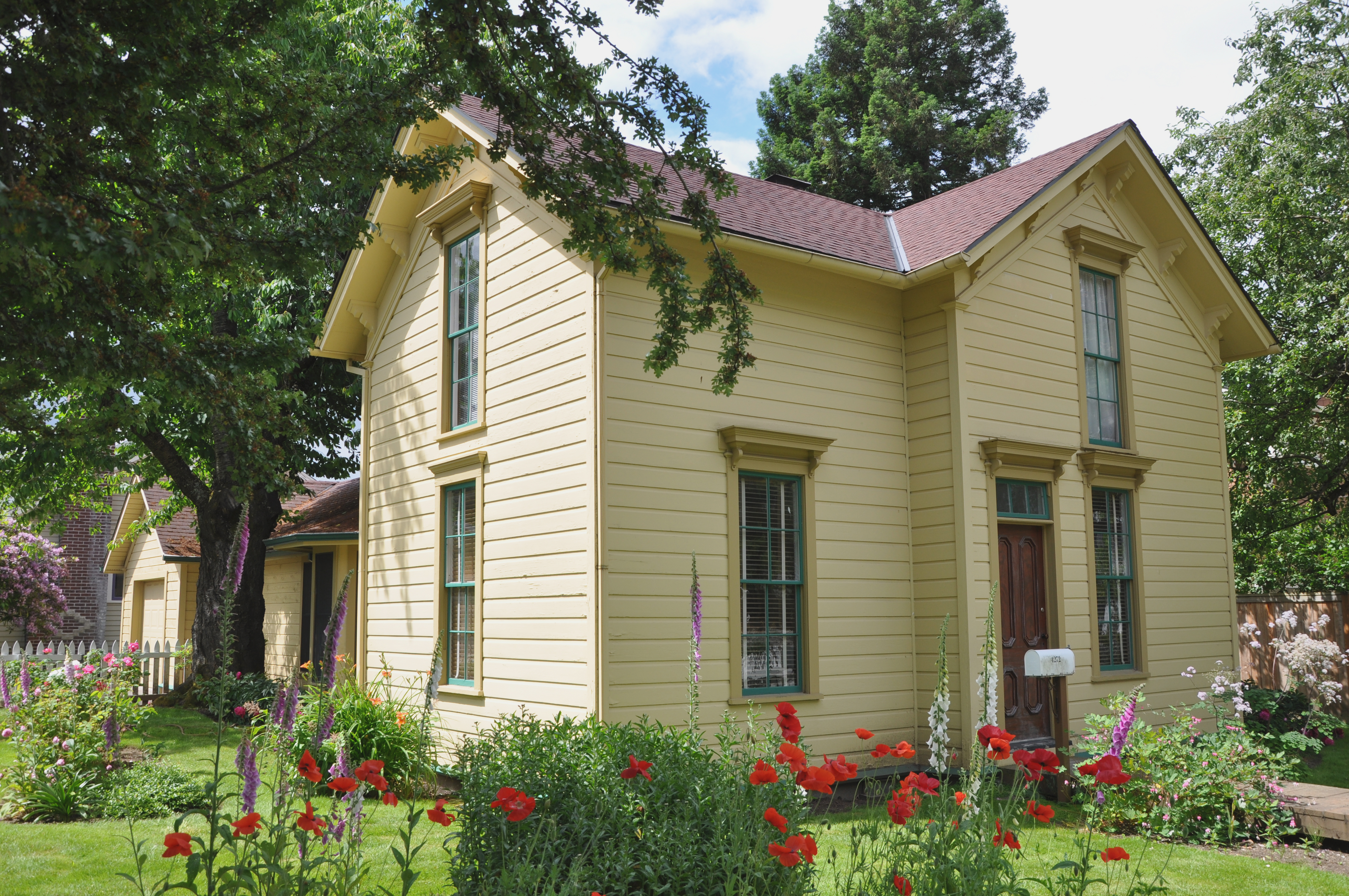
- The Sheffield House in 2011

- Location within Portland, Oregon Location within Oregon Location within the United States
- Location: 4272 SE Washington Street; Portland, Oregon
- Coordinates: 45°31′06″N 122°37′05″W
- Built: 1866
- Architectural style: Classic Revival with Italianate decoration
- NRHP reference No.: 91000139
- Added to NRHP: 1991

The John and Sarah Sheffield House, also known as Paradise Springs Farm, in southeast Portland in the U.S. state of Oregon, is a two-story dwelling listed on the National Register of Historic Places. Built in 1866 as a farm house, it was added to the register in 1991. It is one of the oldest remaining homes in its neighborhood.

Located on the western slope of Mount Tabor, the house is in a residential part of the Sunnyside neighborhood. Built in a Classic Revival architectural style with Italianate decorative elements, the two-story structure was augmented in the early 20th century by two single-story additions to the rear. The original house plan is based on two gables set perpendicular to one another. Constructed of heavy timbers, the house is balloon-framed and is supported by brick columns and by timbers that rest on bricks and stones. Most of the original sash windows contain wavy glass with air bubbles. Interior features include the six original rooms, three on each floor, with ceilings that are 107 inches (270 cm) high downstairs and 103 inches (260 cm) high upstairs. These rooms have original baseboard with crown molding and four-panel doors. A staircase with a banister and a turned newel post connects the two levels.

== History ==
In 1849, Perry and Elizabeth Prettyman settled a Donation Land Claim of 620 acres (250 ha) in East Portland. In 1866, the Sheffields bought 10 acres (4.0 ha) of this property from the Prettymans and built the T-shaped house, which they sold in 1872. At the time the Sheffields bought the property, East Portland was sparsely settled except for businesses along the east bank of the Willamette River. Most residents further east were farmers who lived in small cabins or were engaged in building the first homes. Though many changes occurred in the neighborhood after the house was built, the Sheffield house has retained most of its original features.

== See also ==
- National Register of Historic Places listings in Southeast Portland, Oregon
