= Mount Talbert =

Volcanic cinder cone in Clackamas County, Oregon, United States

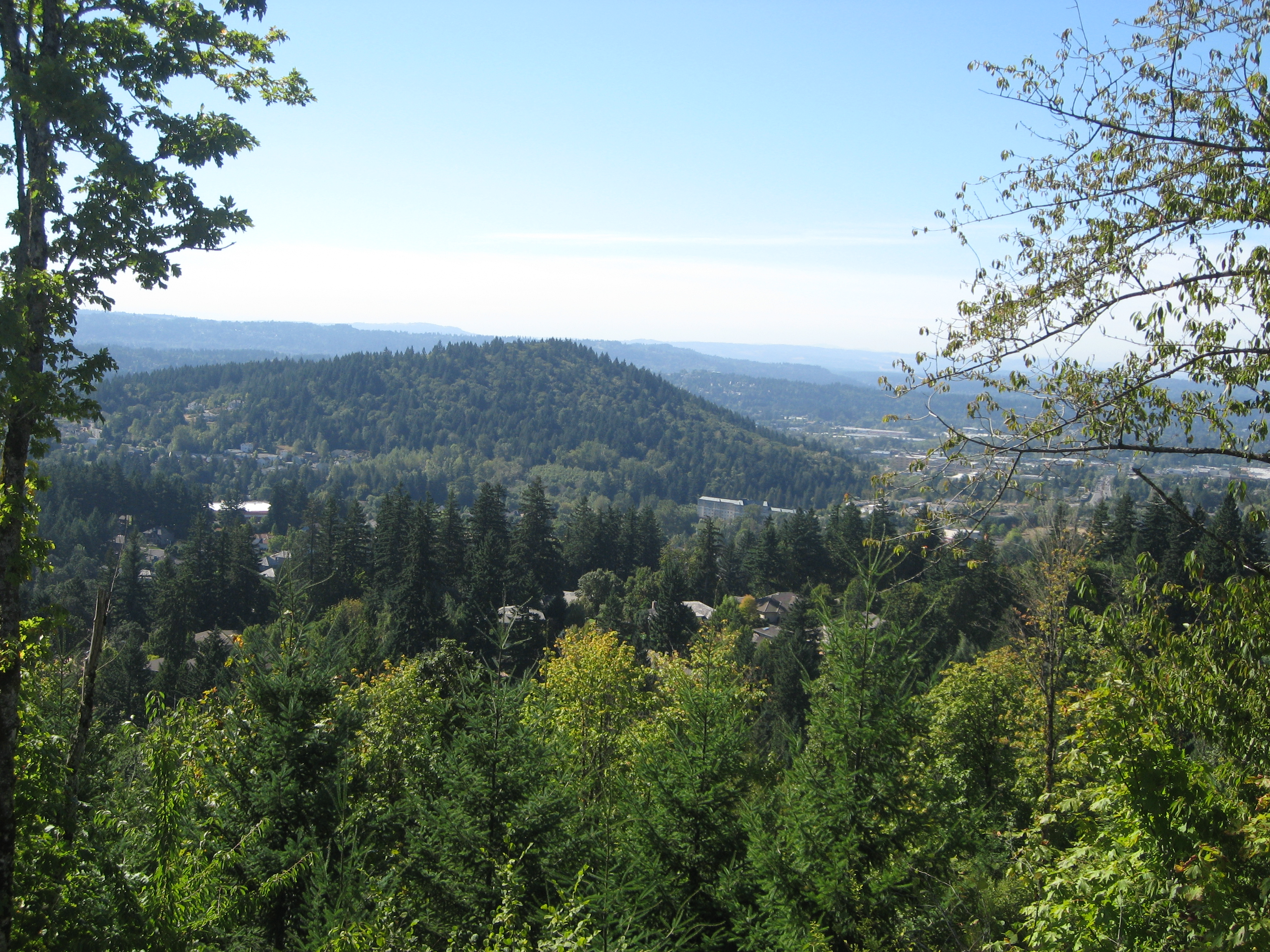

Highest point
- Elevation: 740+ ft (230+ m) NGVD 29
- Prominence: 410 ft (120 m)
- Coordinates: 45°25′36″N 122°33′06″W

Geography
- Location within Oregon Location within the United States
- Location: Clackamas County, Oregon, U.S.
- Parent range: Cascade Range
- Topo map: USGS Gladstone

Geology
- Volcanic field: Boring Lava Field
- Last eruption: 500,000 years ago

Mount Talbert is a volcanic cinder cone in Clackamas County, Oregon. It is part of the Boring Lava Field, a zone of ancient volcanic activity in the area around Portland. Its summit rises to an elevation of 740+ ft (230+ m).

The butte remains undeveloped and is the location of a nature park of the same name which is managed by North Clackamas Parks & Recreation District. The park has 4.2 miles (6.8 km) of hiking trails, including Park Loop, Summit and West Ridge Trail, along which there are several instructive signs about the area's natural resources.

In 2005 the recreation district began promoting regrowth of more fire resistant white oak by girdling and removing Douglas firs, which impede the growth of the oaks by shading out the sun.
