= Chauncey Hosford =

American pioneer (1820–1911)

Chauncey Osborne Hosford (December 27, 1820 – 1911) was an American pioneer and Methodist missionary in Oregon Country.

== Biography ==
He was born in Lexington Heights, New York to the highly religious Willis and Lucia Hosford. Hosford came to Oregon in 1845 with his brother Erwin, and worked for Philip Foster. He later boarded with David Leslie and attended the Oregon Institute. In 1847, Hosford convened the first formal religious gatherings in Portland, Oregon.

Hosford later traveled to Placerville, California, to search for gold during the California Gold Rush. He made some money and moved to San Francisco. He returned to Oregon in 1851 and started the first school in Astoria.

Hosford continued ministering in various places in Oregon and Vancouver, Washington, and filed a land claim in Marion County.

In 1861, Hosford purchased 200 acres (0.81 km^{2}) across the top of Mount Tabor in East Portland.

There is a middle school in southeast Portland named for Hosford. By extension, the Hosford-Abernethy neighborhood (named for the school) also bears his name.
