= Battle Ground Lake State Park =

State park in Washington State, US

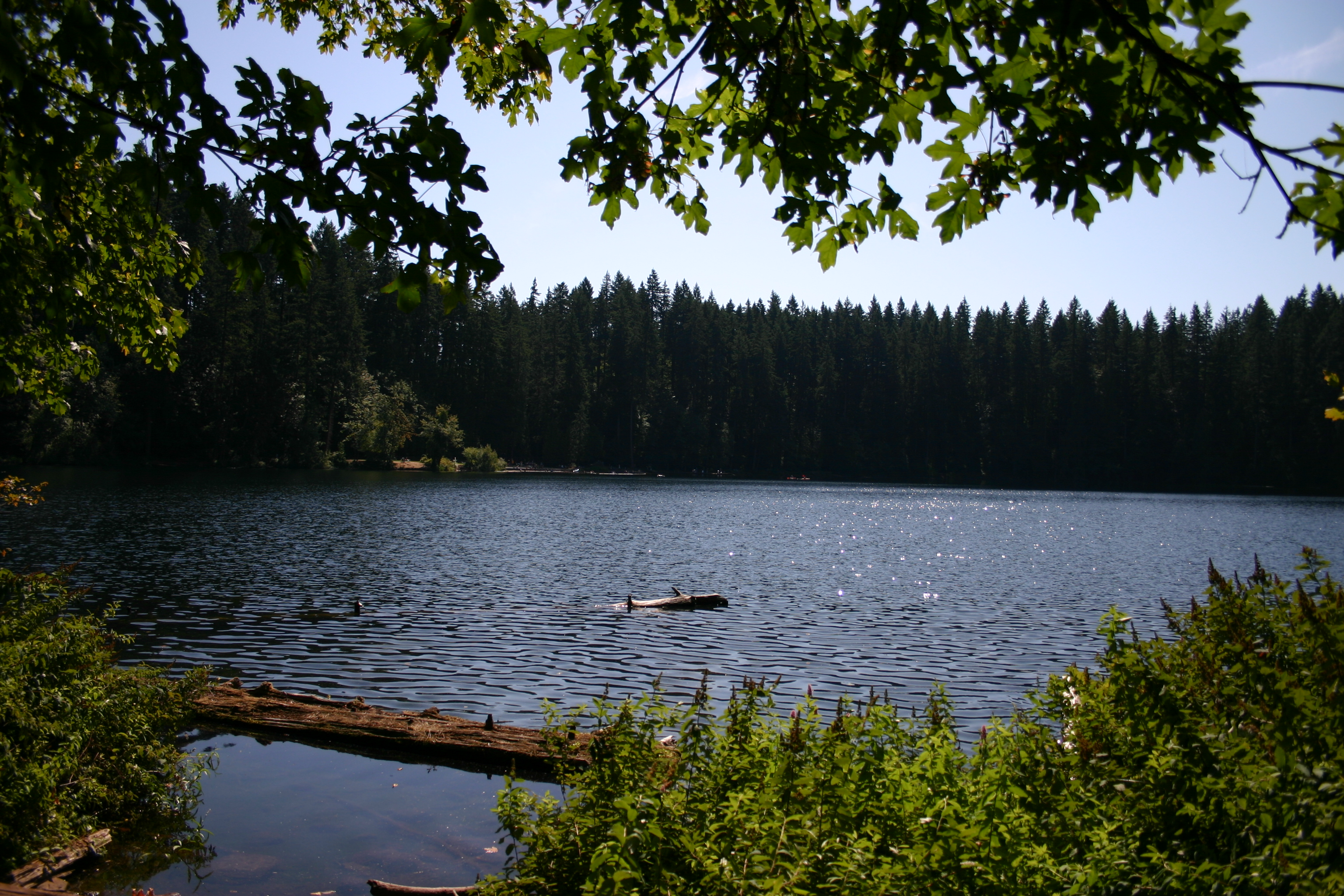
- Interactive map of Battle Ground Lake State Park
- Location: Clark County, Washington, United States
- Coordinates: 45°48′17″N 122°29′38″W
- Area: 280 acres (110 ha)
- Elevation: 509 ft (155 m)
- Established: 1966
- Administrator: Washington State Parks and Recreation Commission
- Designation: Washington state park
- Named for: City of Battle Ground
- Website: Official website
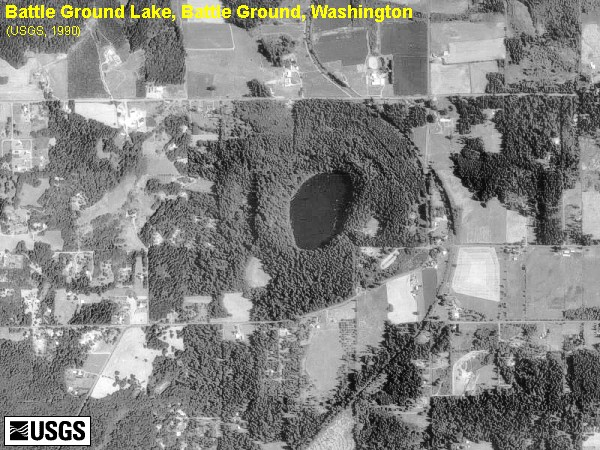
- Aerial view of the lake and park
- Interactive map of Battle Ground Lake
- Formed by: Magma induced steam explosion
- Geology: Maar
- Surface elevation: 509 ft (155 m)
- Volcanic field: Boring Lava Field
- Area: 25.4 acres (10.3 ha)

Battle Ground Lake State Park is a 280-acre (110 ha) public recreation area located three miles (4.8 km) northeast of the city of Battle Ground, Washington. The state park is covered by an evergreen forest that surrounds a crater lake of volcanic origin. The park is managed by the Washington State Parks and Recreation Commission.

== History ==
The park is the site of a 400-foot (120 m) volcano in the Boring Lava Field where a magma-induced steam explosion 105,000 years ago made a large bean-shaped crater, a maar, which later filled with water, forming a crater lake. The lake was the site of a resort dating from the 1920s when a consortium of businessmen planned an upgrade that would include the addition of a dance hall, "swimming tanks," and amusements plus a power plant and electric lights. From 1964 to 1968, the resort was operated by Virgil Dollar, a member of the family for whom the nearby intersection of Dollars Corner was named. The state initiated acquisition of the site in 1965, with purchase for US$550,000 approved in 1966. At a meeting in 1970, the State Parks and Recreation Commission determined that "Battle Ground" should be spelled as two words in deference to the spelling of the nearby city.

== Activities and amenities ==
The park includes a swimming area, boat launch, campground, and cabin rentals. Hiking and bridle trails ring the lake and criss-cross the summit area. Rainbow trout and coastal cutthroat trout are stocked during late winter through spring. Largemouth bass, grass carp, and crappie are present, with trout fishing the main attraction for anglers, especially on opening day.
