= Kelly Butte Natural Area =

Public park in Portland, Oregon, U.S.

- Interactive map of Kelly Butte Natural Area
- Location: SE 103rd Ave. and Clinton St. Portland, Oregon
- Coordinates: 45°29′58″N 122°33′22″W
- Area: 23.34 acres (9.45 ha)
- Created: 1954
- Operator: Portland Parks & Recreation

Kelly Butte Natural Area is a city park of about 23 acres (9.3 ha) in southeast Portland in the U.S. state of Oregon, just east of Interstate 205. The park is named after pioneer Clinton Kelly, who settled the area east of the Willamette River in 1848. It is part of the Boring Lava Field, an extinct Plio-Pleistocene volcanic field that contains 32 cinder cones and shield volcanoes in or near Portland.

The butte contains a now-sealed concrete bunker built as a civil defense emergency operations center in 1955–56 and later used for emergency dispatching. It appears in the film A Day Called X.

== Human history ==
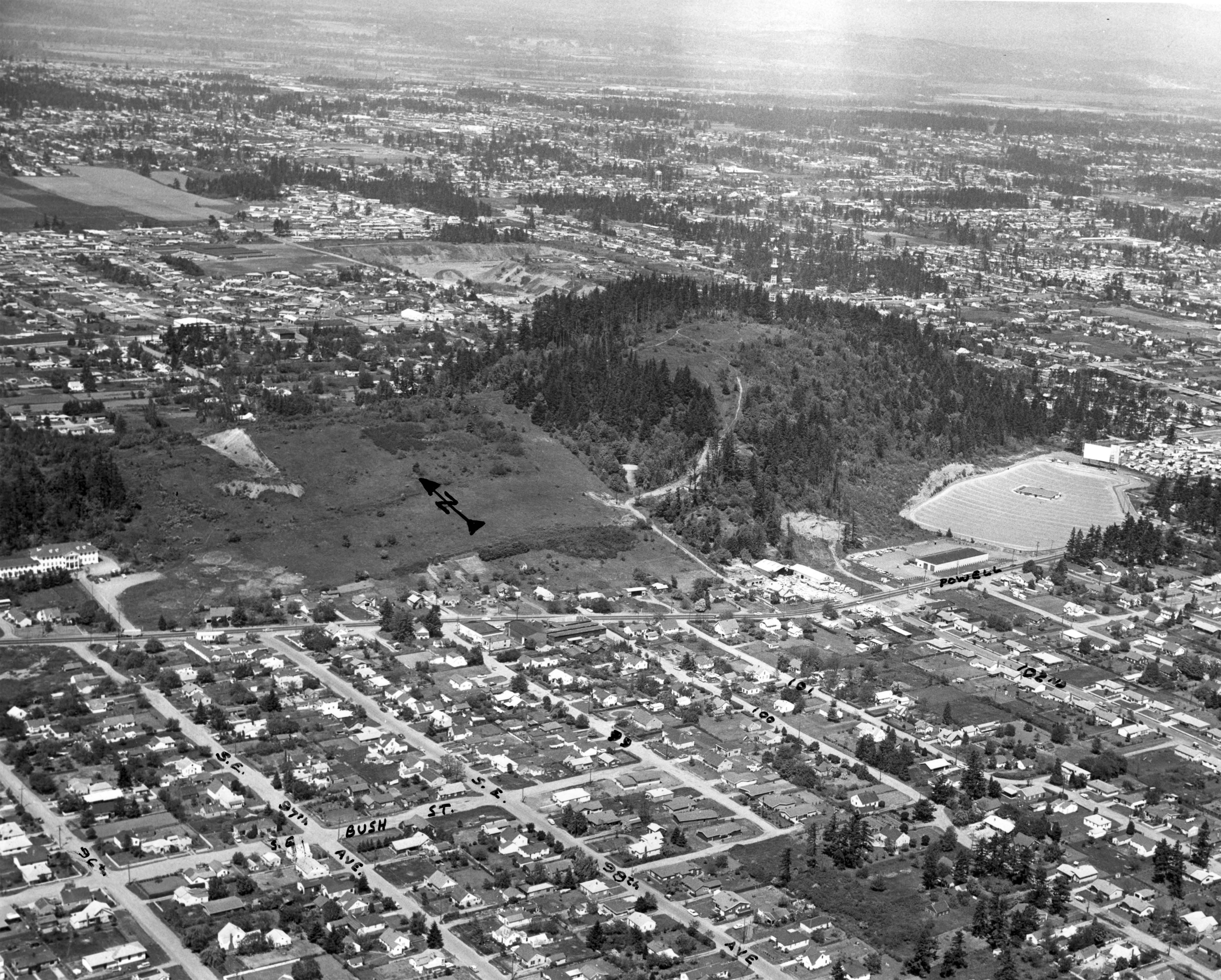
An aerial view of Kelly Butte, circa 1963. The photograph contains directional and road markings.

In 1848, pioneer Clinton Kelly settled in the Willamette Valley in the area that is today southeast Portland. Present-day Clinton Street and Clinton Park bear his name. Clinton had five sons, one of whom, Plympton Kelly, established a farm on or near Kelly Butte. According to a 1906 obituary of Plympton Kelly, the farm was known as the Kelly Butte farm.

In 1906, a prison and rock quarry opened on the site, where prisoners sentenced to hard labor would break rocks. In 1924, two corrections officers and a prisoner were killed when setting explosives at the quarry. The facility operated until the 1950s, providing cheap labor to crush rocks that were used for Portland's roads.

After the prison and quarry closed, a civil defense bunker opened on the site in 1956, costing $670,000. The facility had 20,000 square feet and could house 250 people for two weeks. The facility contained backups of more than 3 million city documents in microfilm. The bunker was later retrofitted and served as an emergency services dispatch center from 1974 through 1994. In 1994 it was shuttered, and in 2006 it was permanently sealed off.

From 1920 to 1960, Kelly Butte was home to a sixty-bed municipal hospital that isolated patients with infectious diseases. In 1968 a ten-million gallon water tank was built in its place.

In 2010, the Portland City Council voted to replace the old water tank with a 25-million gallon underground reservoir. The new reservoir will serve as a replacement for Mount Tabor's three open-air reservoirs.

== Ecology ==
In June 2003, Portland Parks and Recreation surveyed various parcels within the park. The resulting "vegetation unit summary" found 3.83 acres (1.55 ha) of the natural area in good ecological health, 1.94 acres (0.79 ha) in poor ecological health, and approximately 15 acres (6.1 ha) in fair ecological health.

In 2013, as part of a project to install a 25,000,000-US-gallon (95,000,000 L) underground drinking water reservoir within the butte, work crews removed diseased trees, dead trees, and non-native invasive species. Invasive plant cover decreased botanic biodiversity, displaced native species, destroyed wildlife and bird habitat, and resulted in increased stormwater runoff as a consequence of decreased plant community complexity.

One of the vegetation goals of the reservoir project is to reduce the level of invasive plants on the butte. After construction is complete, a re-vegetation plan calls for over 1,600 trees and 7,200 shrubs to be planted on the site. Many of the trees will be planted on the north side of the butte, while the south side will be replanted with an oak savanna. Ground cover plants such as grasses and wildflowers will be seeded in the area. Douglas fir and big leaf maple canopies on the west and north sides of the butte will remain largely intact. After construction is completed in 2015, plant life will continue to be monitored.

== See also ==
- List of parks in Portland, Oregon
