= CRP-2B =

CRP-2B (Crisis Relocation Program 2B) is a hypothetical scenario of nuclear war between the United States and the Soviet Union that was created in 1976 by the Federal Emergency Management Agency. It involved the detonation of 1,444 weapons, with a yield of 6,559 megatons, and projected an American death toll of between 85 and 125 million (the US population at the time was about 218 million). CRP-2B predicts a "countervalue" attack (an attack targeting cities instead of military and industrial infrastructure).

The program was referred to as a "study", but in fact it was the product of a computer simulation. It was also the source of an 80% survival rate figure that was quoted by many people in the years afterwards. The 80% survival rate was an initial assumption, built into the parameters of the computer simulation by its designers. The assumption stems from the conditions of the scenario, with historical precedence in the Cuban Missile Crisis: FEMA assumes that the nuclear exchange would be preceded by 3–5 days of "heightened tensions" that would give Americans time to evacuate major cities. But as the program came to be a "study", so the survival rate figure came to be the "finding" of the study.

Charles F. Estes Jr., director of strategic police at the Office of the Undersecretary of Defense for Policy, stated:

It was assumed at the outset that 80 percent of the population of hypothesized target areas would in fact have been evacuated and would survive. [...] [T]his was an entering assumption rather than one of the study's analytically derived findings. [...] It is importance to note that the survivability assumptions [...] of the computer model were derived from opinions of interested civil defense program managers, academics, and contractor personnel These opinions were obtained through the use of accepted opinion survey techniques.

— Charles F. Estes Jr.,

This 80% figure was quoted in the 1980s by U.S. congresspeople and other officials.

== Criticism ==
The 80% survival rate assumption has since come under significant criticism from academics and organizations like the Federation of American Scientists (FAS). FAS criticized CRP-2B for failing to consider the potential ecological impacts of nuclear war, including nuclear winter, disruptions to agriculture, and the radioactive contamination of water supplies. It further criticized CRP-2B for studying only direct and immediate consequences of the attacks, ignoring the long-term threats to human health posed by ionizing radiation and social problems caused by breakdowns in law and order, strife between relocated populations and host communities, and disruptions to the supply of medical equipment. Stanford University radiologist and anti-nuclear activist Herbert L. Abrams was particularly critical of the scenario's assumptions regarding the injured. He noted that hospitals would quickly be overwhelmed by the number of victims, particularly burn victims, who already face shortages of beds, medical personnel, and resources. Abrams estimated that because 80% of hospitals are in urban areas and would so be destroyed in the attack, there would 1 bed for every 563 severely injured patients. Hospitals would face similar post-attack shortages for blood, plasma, and other fluids and drugs and bandages, which would prevent effective treatment of the wounded and patients with chronic illnesses. Taking into account these impacts on medical facilities, Abrams estimates that only 60 million Americans would survive in the CRP-2B scenario, before nuclear winter, social strife, and disruptions to the food supply are considered.

== See also ==
- A Day Called X
