= Clinton Kelly (minister) =

American minister and pioneer

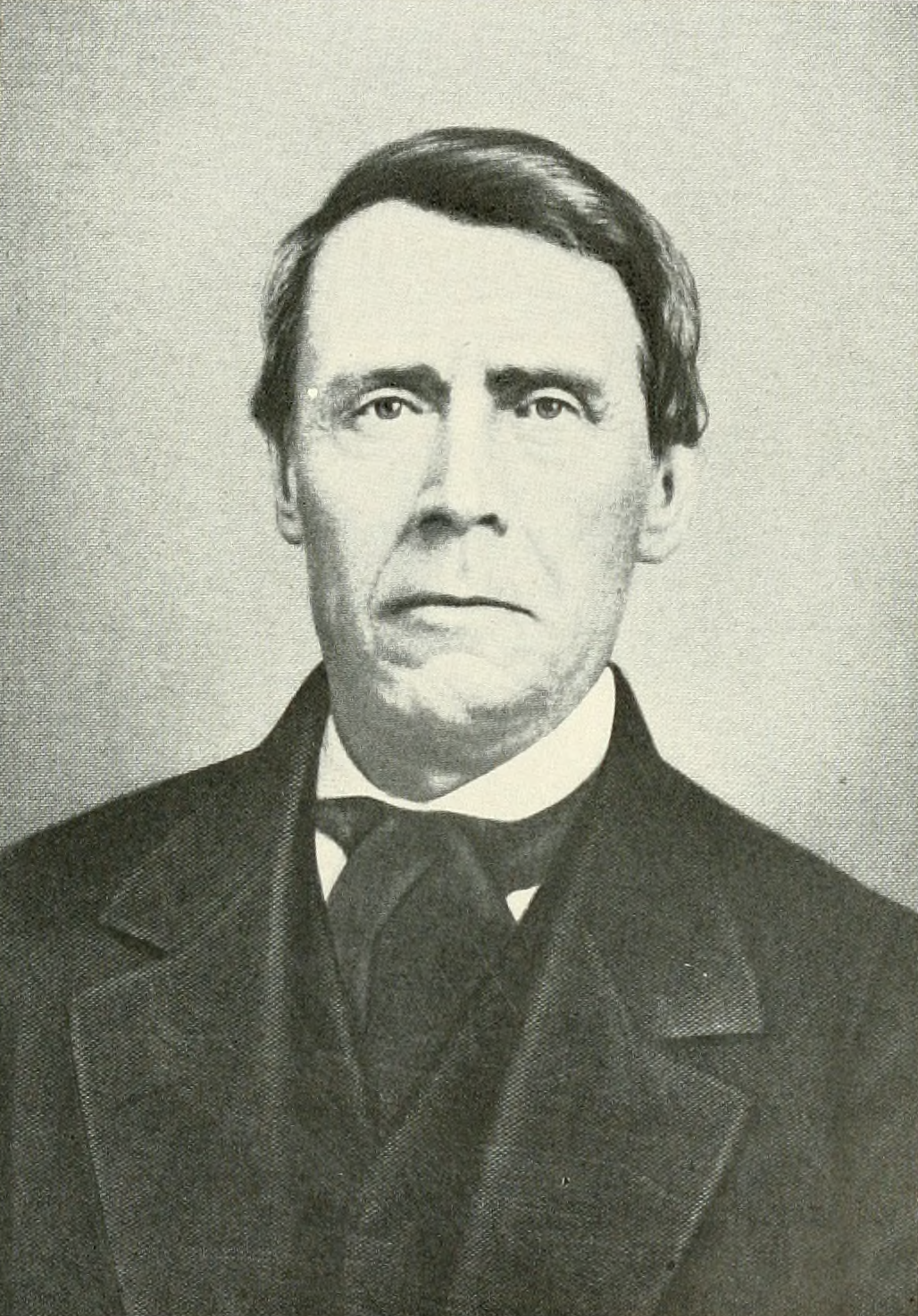
- Born: June 15, 1808; Clifty Creek, Pulaski County, Kentucky, US
- Died: June 19, 1875 (aged 67)
- Occupation: Minister
- Spouses: Mary Baston (m. 1827; died 1837) Jane Burns (m. 1838; died 1839) Moriah Crain (m. 1840; died 1863)
- Children: 15, including Penumbra and Richmond Kelly

Reverend Clinton Kelly (June 15, 1808 – June 19, 1875) was an early pioneer of what became the U.S. state of Oregon.

Kelly was born on June 15, 1808, in Pulaski County, Kentucky, the son of Samuel and Nancy Kelly.

In January 1827, he joined the Methodist Episcopal Church and became a pastor.

Kelly joined the Methodist Episcopal Church, South after its succession from the main church. After seeing what would come of slavery and the strife surrounding it, however, he and his family, along with his brothers Albert and Thomas, traveled to the Oregon Country in 1847, arriving in late 1848 (by which time Oregon had become a U.S. territory). They initially stayed in a cabin on James B. Stephens' claim. They later settled in what is now Oregon City, where Kelly purchased his land claim for $50. He died on June 19, 1875, at the age of 67.

== Family ==
In August 1827, Kelly married Mary Baston, and together they had five boys: Plympton, Hampton, Archon, Calmet and Benjal. Mary died on June 14, 1837. A year later Kelly married Jane Burns. Clinton and Jane had one daughter, Mary Jane, and Jane died shortly afterwards. Kelly married his third wife, Moriah Maldon Crain, on March 11, 1840. Clinton and Moriah had nine children together. Moriah died on January 30, 1863.

The eldest of Clinton and Moriah's children was Sarah Margaret Kelly, who later became the wife of Captain John W. Kern. Among Moriah and Clinton's other children was their son Penumbra Kelly, who became a sheriff and later a U.S. Marshal of the district and who also represented Multnomah County in the Oregon State Legislature for four terms. Another son, Dr. Richmond Kelly, was a well-known citizen of Portland, Oregon, for whom the Richmond neighborhood was named. Penumbra married Mary E. Marquam, daughter of Judge Philip A. Marquam, in 1875. Three of Clinton and Moriah's children died in childhood.

== Legacy ==
Clinton Street and Clinton Park in Portland are named after Kelly. Albert Kelly Park in Portland is named after Rev. Albert Kelly, Clinton Kelly's brother. Clinton Kelly Elementary School in Lents is named after Clinton Kelly who also made land donations to establish Clinton Kelly School on SE 26th and Powell which later became Cleveland High School.

Kelly's family figures prominently in the history of the Mt. Tabor area of Portland. Kelly's son Plympton may have influenced the naming of Mt. Tabor after Mount Tabor in Palestine.

Kelly Butte was on a portion of Plympton Kelly's land claim.
