= Mount Sylvania =

Extinct volcano near Portland, Oregon, United States

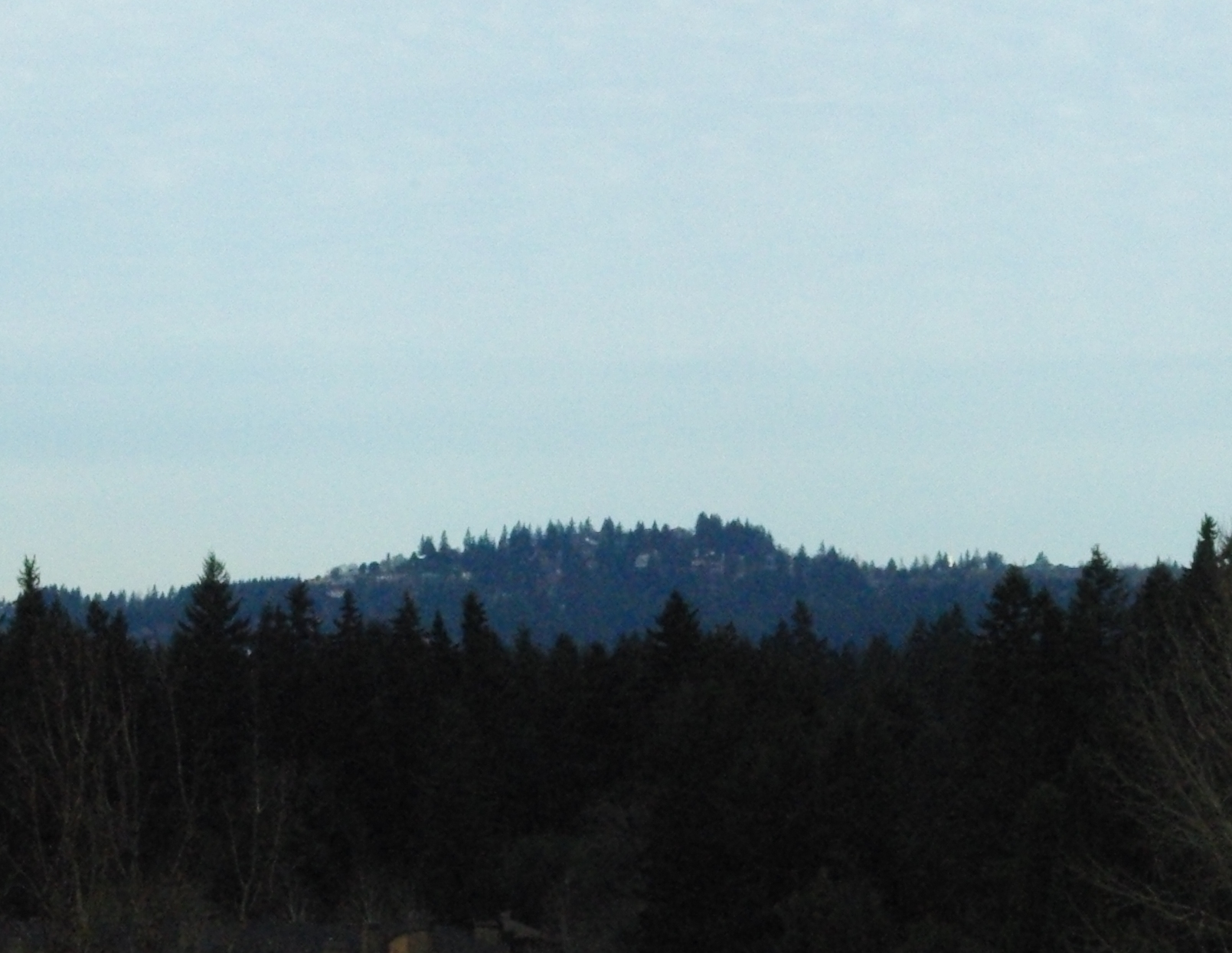
- Top as seen from Tualatin

Highest point
- Elevation: 978 ft (298 m) NAVD 88
- Prominence: 510 ft (155 m)
- Coordinates: 45°26′17″N 122°43′18″W

Naming
- Etymology: Derived from Silvanus, a Roman tutelary deity

Geography
- Location: Multnomah County, Oregon, U.S.
- Parent range: Tualatin Mountains
- Topo map: USGS Lake Oswego

Geology
- Mountain type: Shield volcano
- Volcanic field: Boring Lava Field

Mount Sylvania is an extinct volcano, part of the Boring Lava Field, on the outskirts of Portland, Oregon. Parts of the mountain are within the cities of Portland, Lake Oswego, and Tigard.

The Sylvania campus of Portland Community College is located on the mountain's western slopes.
