= The Day Called 'X' =

- The Title Card Used for the Film
- Written by: Lester Cooper; Harry Rasky
- Directed by: Harry Rasky
- Narrated by: Glenn Ford
- Country of origin: United States
- Original language: English

Production
- Producer: Harry Rasky
- Cinematography: Frederick Dietrich
- Editor: Bernard Birnbaum
- Running time: 30 minutes
- Production companies: CBS Public Affairs, in co-operation with the Federal Civil Defense Administration

Original release
- Network: CBS
- Release: December 8, 1957

The Day Called 'X' is a dramatized CBS documentary film set in Portland, Oregon, in which the entire city is evacuated in anticipation of a nuclear air raid, after Soviet bombers had been detected by radar stations to the north; it details the activation of the city's civil defense protocols and leads up to the moment before the attack (the ending is left intentionally unknown). The operations were run from the Kelly Butte Bunker, which was the emergency operations center at that time. It was filmed in September 1957 and aired December 8 of that year.

Apart from presenter/narrator Glenn Ford, none of the people shown are actors. They are locals of Portland shown in their real jobs, including Mayor Terry Schrunk. Whenever one of these individuals is heard uttering warnings or statements regarding attack, the words "AN ATTACK IS NOT TAKING PLACE" are superimposed over the picture.

On September 27, 1955, Portland actually conducted an exercise evacuation of downtown called "Operation Greenlight", which is referenced by the film. It was re-broadcast locally in 2004 and uploaded by the online Prelinger Archives.

== See also ==
- United States civil defense § Evacuation plans
- CRP-2B
