= Portland Sanitarium Nurses' Quarters =

Historic building in Portland, Oregon, U.S.

- U.S. National Register of Historic Places
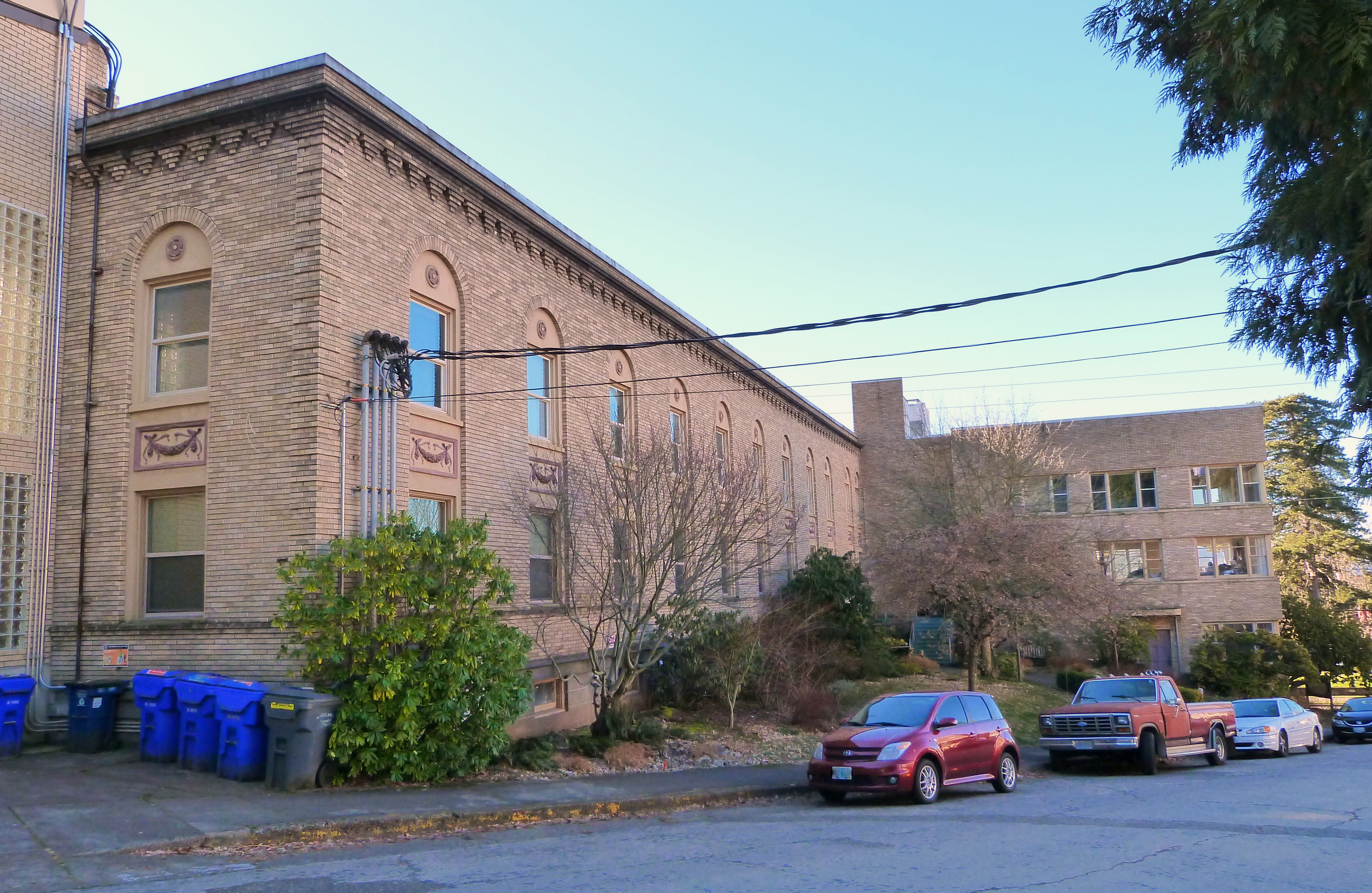
- The building's exterior in 2017

- Location within Oregon Location within the United States
- Location: Portland, Oregon
- Coordinates: 45.5157°N 122.6017°W
- Built: 1928
- Architect: Claussen and Claussen
- Architectural style: Neoclassical
- NRHP reference No.: 100001275
- Added to NRHP: July 34, 2017

The Portland Sanitarium Nurses' Quarters, located at 6012 Southeast Yamhill Street in southeast Portland, Oregon, are listed on the National Register of Historic Places. The back portion of the building, constructed in 1928, features a neoclassical brick style while the four-story front portion was built in 1946 in an International style. It was designed by Claussen and Claussen.

The building housed nurses for the former adjacent Portland Adventist Sanitarium. The sanitarium was founded around 1895 when the Seventh-day Adventists rented an eight-bedroom mansion from Simeon Reed, converting it into a six-patient facility. By 1897, the property was owned by the Seventh-day Adventist Church, which established the vegetarian Portland Sanitarium Food Company as a branch of the Battle Creek Sanitarium Food Company. A vegetarian restaurant also opened on the site.

Until it was closed for construction, the Nurses' Quarters building housed the Institute for International Christian Communication's WorldView Center, a missionary training program. The program split in 2018, and the training center was renamed to CultureBound. The building was subsequently sold.

In 2014, the building underwent land use review and rezoning in to be converted into 75 micro-apartments, including seismic retrofits. It reopened as "Tabor Commons Apartments" around 2020.

== See also ==
- National Register of Historic Places listings in Southeast Portland, Oregon
