= Mount Tabor, Portland, Oregon =

Mount Tabor
- Neighborhood
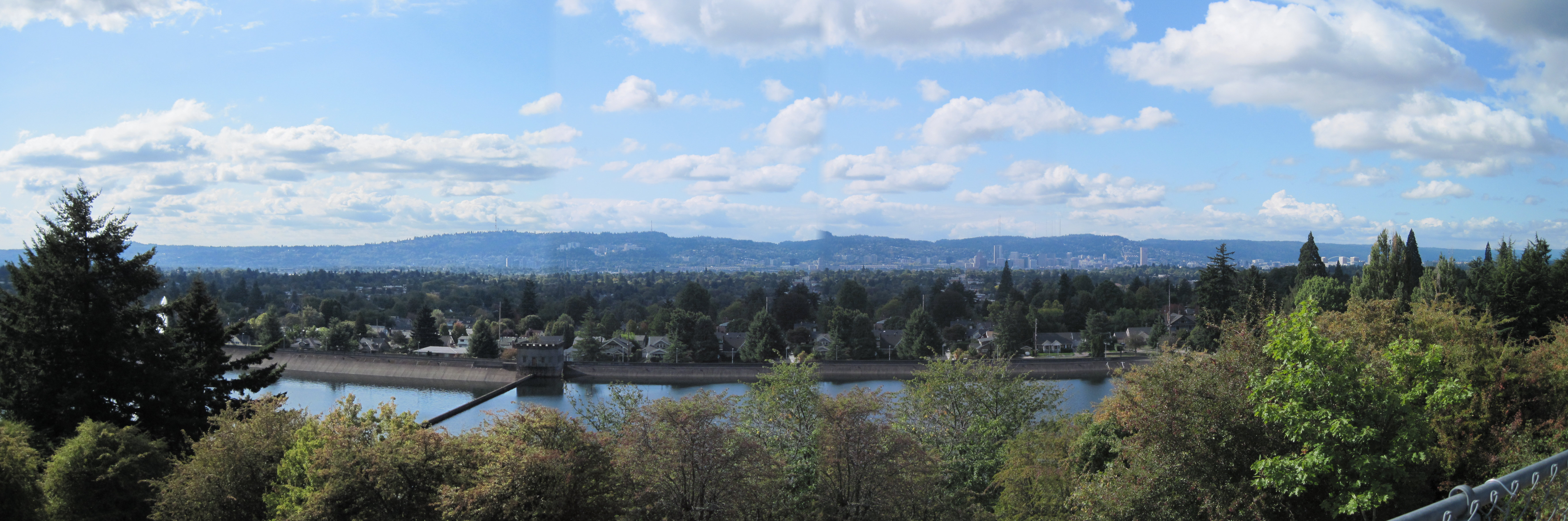
- Downtown Portland, Oregon, seen from Mount Tabor Park.
- Location in Portland
- Coordinates: 45°30′46″N 122°35′33″W
- Country: United States
- State: Oregon
- City: Portland

Government
  - Association: Mount Tabor Neighborhood Association
  - Coalition: Southeast Uplift

Area
  - Total: 1.60 sq mi (4.14 km^{2})

Population (2020)
  - Total: 10,751
  - Density: 6,719/sq mi (2,594/km^{2})

Housing
  - No. of households: 4756
  - Occupancy rate: 93.9% occupied
  - Owner-occupied: 2808 households (65%)
  - Renting: 1508 households (35%)
  - Avg. household size: 2.2 persons
- Race Distribution: White 81%, Asian 7.5%, Hispanic 6.2%, Black 2.8%

Mount Tabor is a neighborhood in Southeast Portland that takes its name from the volcanic cinder cone and city park on the volcano that it surrounds, in the U.S. state of Oregon. The name refers to Mount Tabor, Israel. It was named by Plympton Kelly, son of Oregon City pioneer resident Clinton Kelly.

== Neighborhood ==
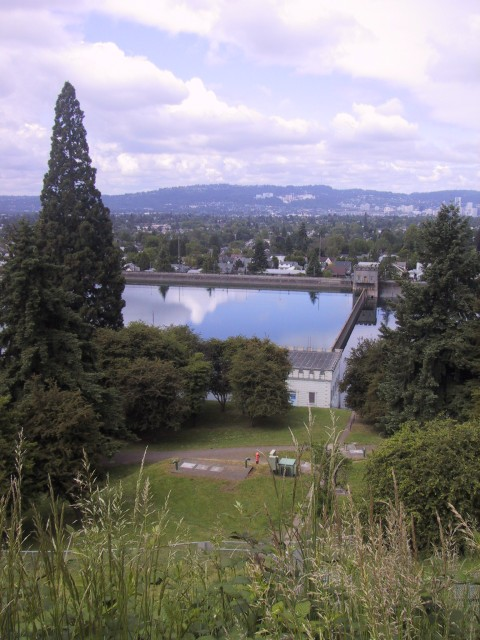
Mount Tabor Reservoir

The Mount Tabor neighborhood lies between SE 49th Ave. (SE 50th Ave. south of SE Hawthorne Blvd.) on the west and SE 76th Ave. on the east, and between E Burnside St. on the north and SE Division St. on the south. It is bordered by Sunnyside and Richmond on the west, North Tabor on the north and west, Montavilla on the north and east, and South Tabor on the south.

Mount Tabor Park is the neighborhood's principal feature. The campus of Warner Pacific University (affiliated with the Church of God (Anderson)) is located just south of the park. The neighborhood also marks the eastern end of the Hawthorne District. The campus of Western Seminary is located on the western slope, overlooking downtown Portland.

Portland Public Schools serves the area's public schools, with Glencoe Elementary and Mount Tabor Middle School, which sends graduates to Franklin High School.

== History ==
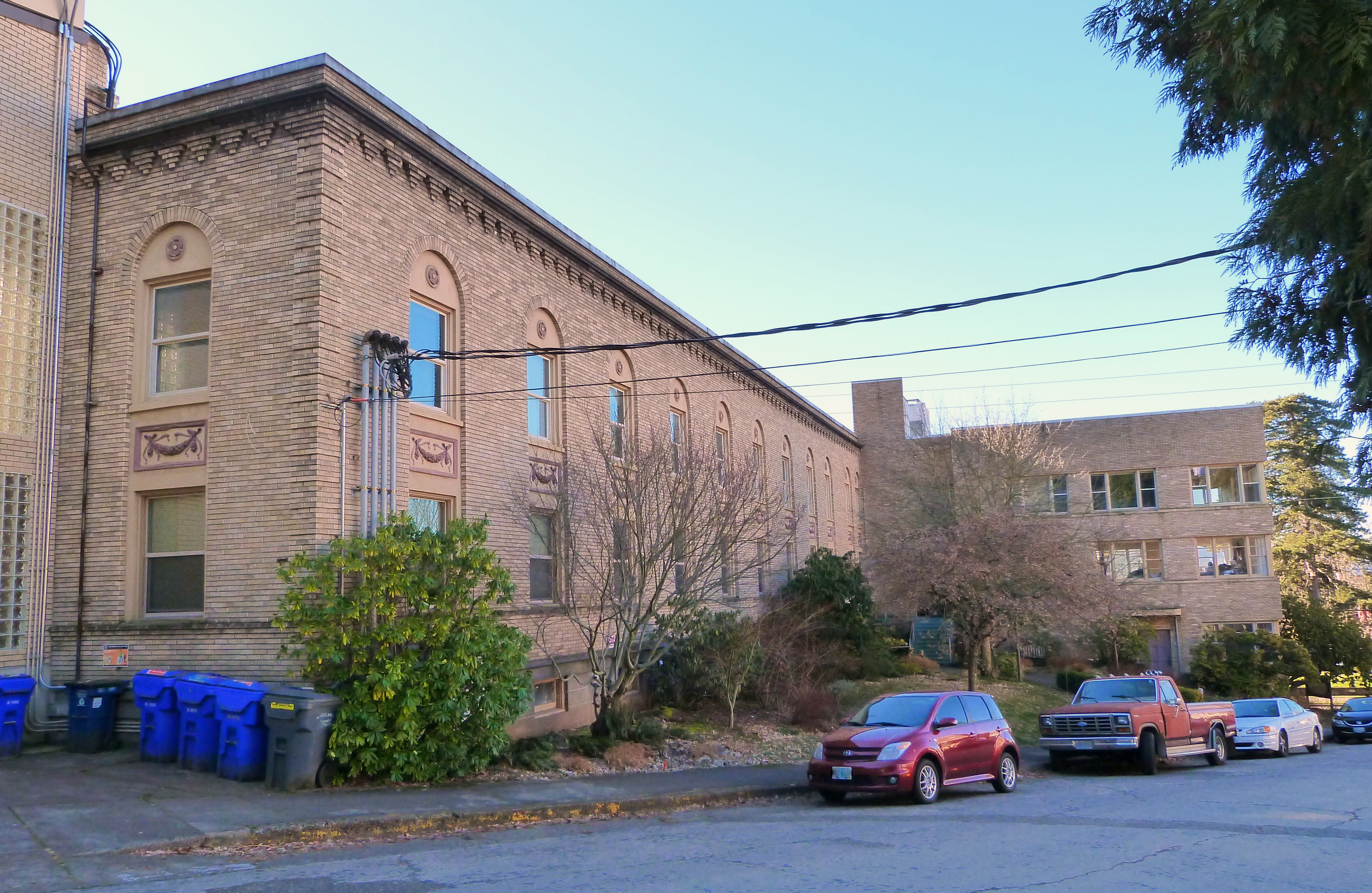
The historic Portland Sanitarium Nurses' Quarters, built in 1928

Before becoming part of Portland in 1905, Mount Tabor was a rural farming community dating back to the 1850s. After a large wildfire burnt much of Mount Tabor's landscape in 1846, trails and farmhouses began to appear in the area. In 1903, John C. Olmstead submitted a report to Portland that the city should acquire "considerable land on this prominent and beautiful hill", and it was annexed two years later.

It became a city-recognized neighborhood (encompassing a far smaller area than its historical boundaries) in 1974.

Historical population
Census	Pop.	Note	%±
2000	10,037		—
2010	10,196		1.6%
2020	10,751		5.4%

== Reservoir controversy ==
The Mount Tabor reservoirs, along with those in Portland's Washington Park, have been the subject of a decade-long controversy surrounding lucrative engineering contracts to replace the historic open reservoirs with underground storage tanks. Concern has been raised about the possible relationship between City officials and the engineering firms receiving the no-bid reservoir decommissioning contracts; and about the role these parties may have played in lobbying for pro-underground-tank modifications (the "LT2" rule) to the Safe Drinking Water Act.

On June 15, 2011, a man was observed urinating in a nearly 8,000,000 gallon reservoir, prompting city officials to drain the water at a cost of around $36,000.

Under LT2 several hundred of the country's historic open reservoirs were decommissioned.

Following pressure from other open-reservoir cities, in 2011 the EPA softened its stance on the LT2 rule and allowed the country's remaining open reservoirs to halt burial plans; but despite public outcry Mount Tabor's open reservoirs remained slated for decommissioning. In August 2015, the Portland City Council passed a unanimous vote to decommission the three open reservoirs.

After decommissioning, the three open reservoirs no longer supplied drinking water but generally remained filled with water. However, in 2021, structural concerns emerged related to Reservoir 6 and it has since remained drained.

== See also ==
- Chauncey Hosford, an early owner of the property at the summit of Mount Tabor
- Statue of Harvey W. Scott, a sculpture by Gutzon Borglum
