= The Liquor Store =

Defunct bar and restaurant in Portland, Oregon, U.S.

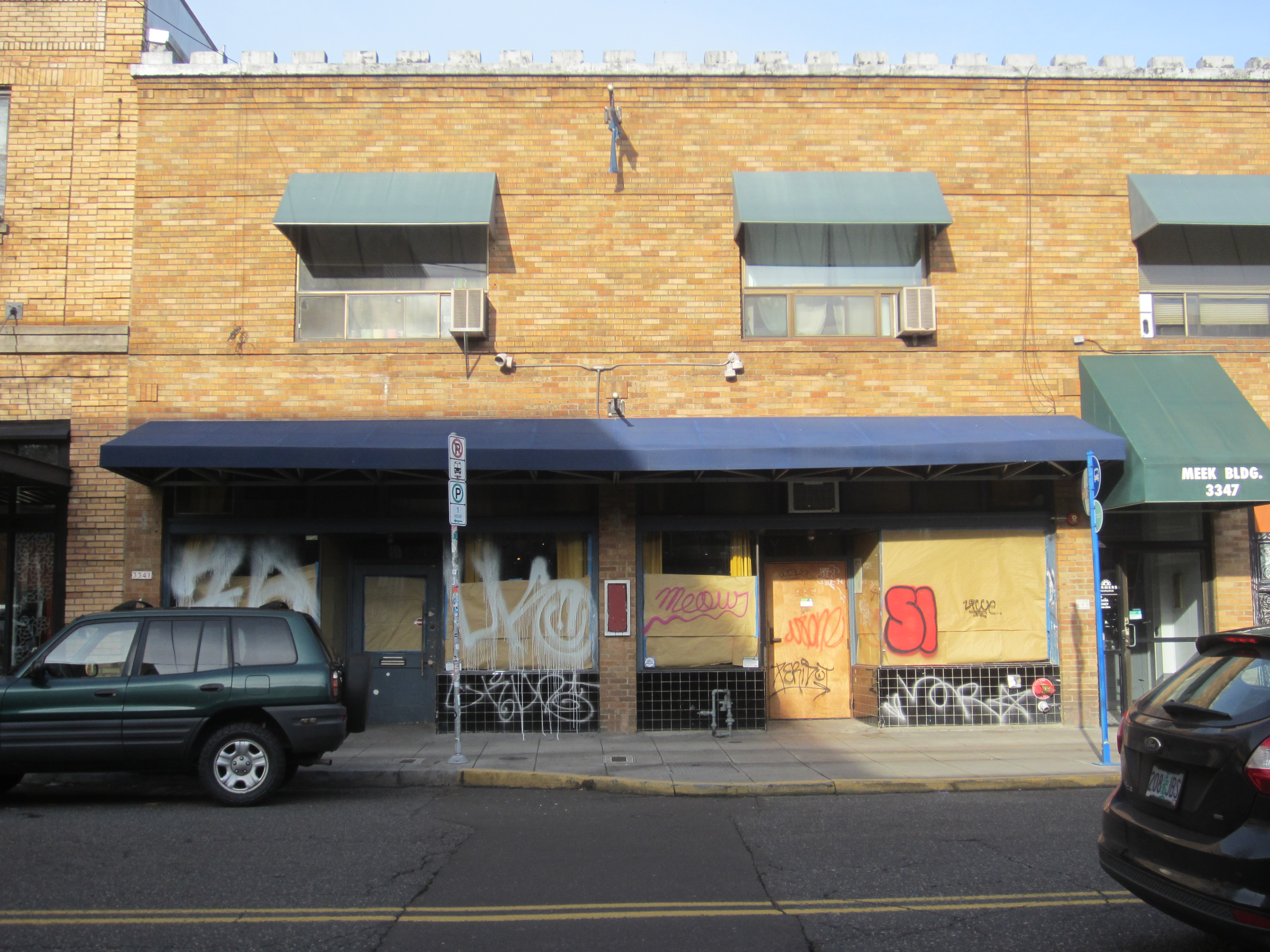
- Venue exterior in 2021, after its closure
- Interactive map of The Liquor Store
- Address: 3341 Southeast Belmont Street; Portland, Oregon; United States
- Coordinates: 45.5166°N 122.6230°W
- Owner: Ray Morrone
- Type: Bar; restaurant; music venue

Construction
- Opened: February 2015
- Closed: September 2020

Website
- theliquorstorepdx.com

The Liquor Store was a bar, restaurant, and music venue in Portland, Oregon. Established in 2015, the business operated in a space previously occupied by the Blue Monk, a jazz club and restaurant, in southeast Portland's Sunnyside neighborhood. It was named the city's best new bar in Willamette Week's annual readers' poll in 2015 and 2016. The Liquor Store's upstairs had a bar and the owner's large vinyl record collection on display. The downstairs venue hosted live music and disc jockeys, playing a variety of genres, especially electronic music.

The Liquor Store closed temporarily in March 2020 because of the COVID-19 pandemic, and two former employees filed a lawsuit claiming sexual harassment one month later. Sometimes confused for an actual liquor store, The Liquor Store closed permanently in September 2020.

== Description ==
The Liquor Store was a bar, restaurant, and music venue in southeast Portland's Sunnyside neighborhood. Upstairs was a horseshoe-shaped bar and shelves displaying the owner's extensive personal vinyl record collection, numbering in the hundreds. The downstairs space had a sound reinforcement system by Funktion-One. The Liquor Store hosted disc jockeys (DJs) and live music regularly, often for $10 or less. Google Maps labeled the venue a liquor store, prompting the business to add "not a real liquor store" to its website.

Willamette Week's Martin Cizmar said the "shiny" bar had a music collection ranging from David Bowie to Bob Dylan and displayed "yellowed" newspapers covering the murder of John Lennon, Richard Nixon's resignation, and Neil Armstrong's walk on the Moon. The newspaper's Jay Horton and AP Kryza said frequent patrons "are drawn in for enlightened takes on bar-food staples, while the nightly invasion of dressed-to-impress concertgoers depends more on the venue's top-shelf sound system and eclectic booking". Horton described the venue as a "temporary pied-à-terre that attracts the cream of like-minded drinking partners", with "silent-screen classic" films projected on a back wall and "up-and-coming" bands downstairs. He wrote, "With interiors showcasing an embarrassment of purposeless signifiers (vintage newspapers, stacks of vinyl, clarinet, pot-bellied stove), the space can seem like a satire of a grad-student Tinder profile."

The Portland Mercury called the venue "another one of these subterranean joints ... that often hosts DJ nights and a cavernous, low-lit venue downstairs where you're likely to find local psych-rock or dance parties on any given night". Willamette Week said the main floor had "flickering candlelight, walls filled with vinyl and a steady stream of DJs who create the vibe of a hip after-hours party at a rich friend's parents' house... In the low-ceilinged basement, you'll find touring house, bass and EDM producers alongside locals spinning everything from art rock to Zouglou, as well as indie bands who missed the actual basement show scene by a few years." The newspaper also said, "Most nights feature a DJ on the main level, where craft cocktails and shelves of pulp fiction books and vinyl set a comfortably cool vibe. To bust a move, head downstairs during a live show for an intimate, sweaty basement party every time the hip-hop, indie-rock or dance act takes the stage." Eater Portland's Cooper Green described the bar as an "ultra-hip spot" with happy hour from 5:00 to 7:00 pm.

The bar served a cocktail with blue curaçao and lime called the Blue Monk, named after the defunct jazz club of the same name which occupied the space previously. The menu included cornbread macaroni and cheese, nachos, and the Really Good Gin and Tonic made with Beefeater Gin and house-made tonic. The handcrafted candied lemon wedges served in Slane Irish Whiskeys take approximately three hours to make. Pizza was featured during happy hour on Mondays, as of 2016. The Seelbach was made of whisky, bitters, cava float, and Créole Shrubb liqueur.

== History ==
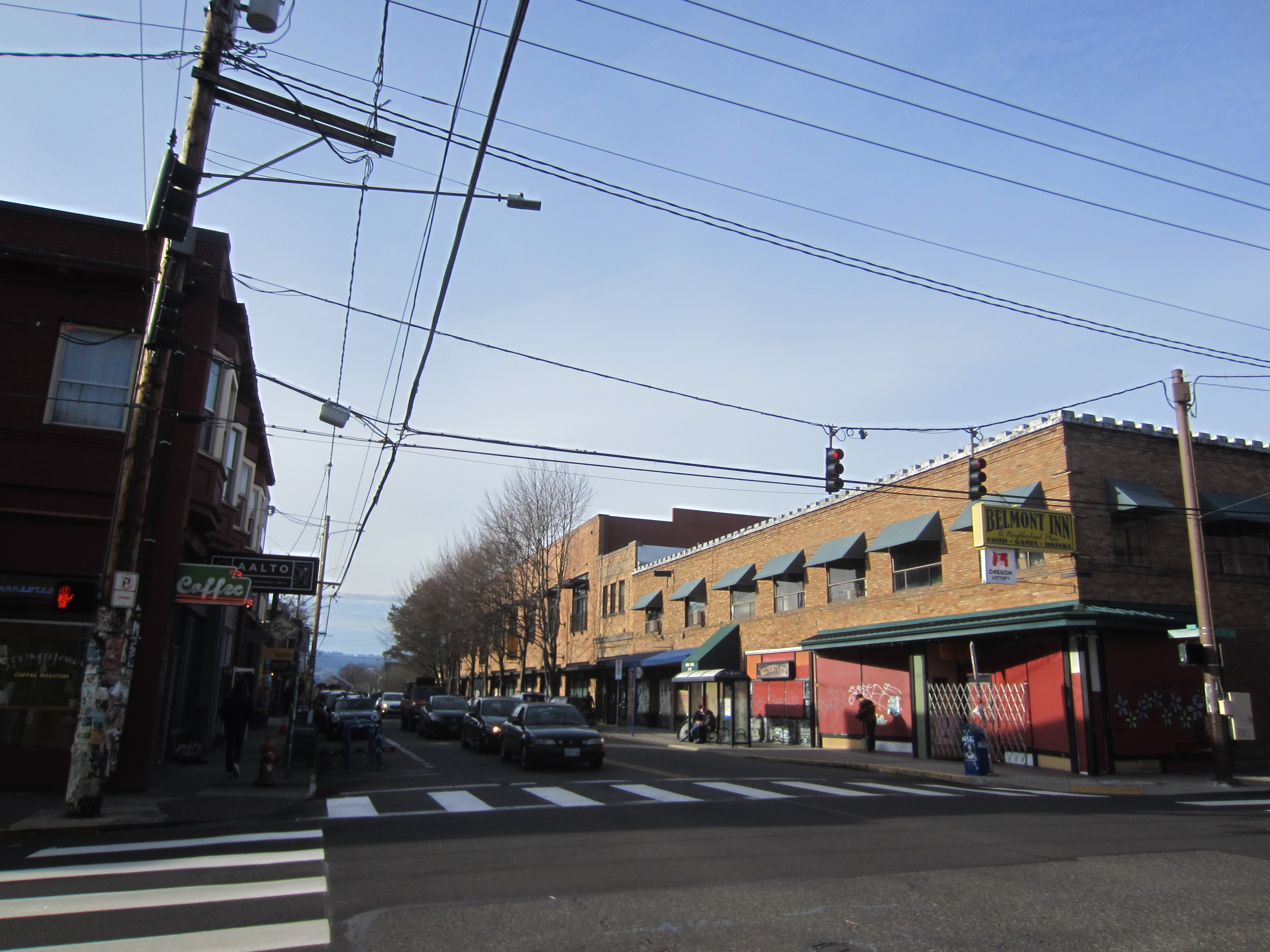
The intersection of Southeast 34th Avenue and Belmont Street in 2021, showing the building which housed The Liquor Store and neighboring Belmont Inn across the street from the Aalto Lounge and Circa 33

Owner Ray Morrone opened The Liquor Store in February 2015, following the closing of the Blue Monk in 2014. Cooper DuBois was one of the bar's investors.

In November 2015, Morrone confirmed the installation of new sprinklers and emergency exits. He also told The Oregonian that many records from his collection had been stolen and said of electronic music: "That's what I grew up listening to, so that's important to me. Going all the way back to (the) Hacienda nightclub in Manchester being a big influence." Actor Sam Elliott visited the bar frequently during happy hour.

=== Events ===
In 2016, the venue hosted an acoustic show by Fred and Toody Cole, electronic artists Copy and Symbion Project, and a sixtieth birthday celebration for Wipers drummer Sam Henry. The venue also began hosting the weekly comedy show Earthquake Hurricane. A variety of DJs performed at the bar, as of 2016–2018. In 2017, the bar hosted 1984: New Wave Night on the night before Thanksgiving, and Mothers and Mega Bog performed there in 2018. The venue hosted the monthly hip hop event Thirsty City, as of 2018, and the techno series SubSensory, as of 2019. The latter, according to Mixmag's Kelly Cramer, showcased "an impressive array of first time PDX appearances and continues to push the techno envelope".

The bar hosted the monthly jazz series Daniel Rossi Presents, as of 2019. Willamette Week's Donovan Farley described the series as "boundary-pushing" and "affordable", successfully accomplishing the goals of local jazz and rock musician Daniel Rossi, who began organizing accessible performances showcasing jazz fusion. Rossi said of the series, "I approached the Liq, which was in my mind because they have a great live music program and it used to be the Blue Monk, which was a jazz club I used to go to back in the day. The idea is to get young people that would usually go to, or even play, indie-rock shows or psych-rock shows at a place where they're comfortable like the Liquor Store and expose them to this cool music they might not otherwise seek out." Other recurring events, as of 2019, included the Andaz Bhangra Bollywood Dance Party featuring urban desi and Indian dance pop and Spend the Night with "buzzy" European industrial music.

=== Closure ===
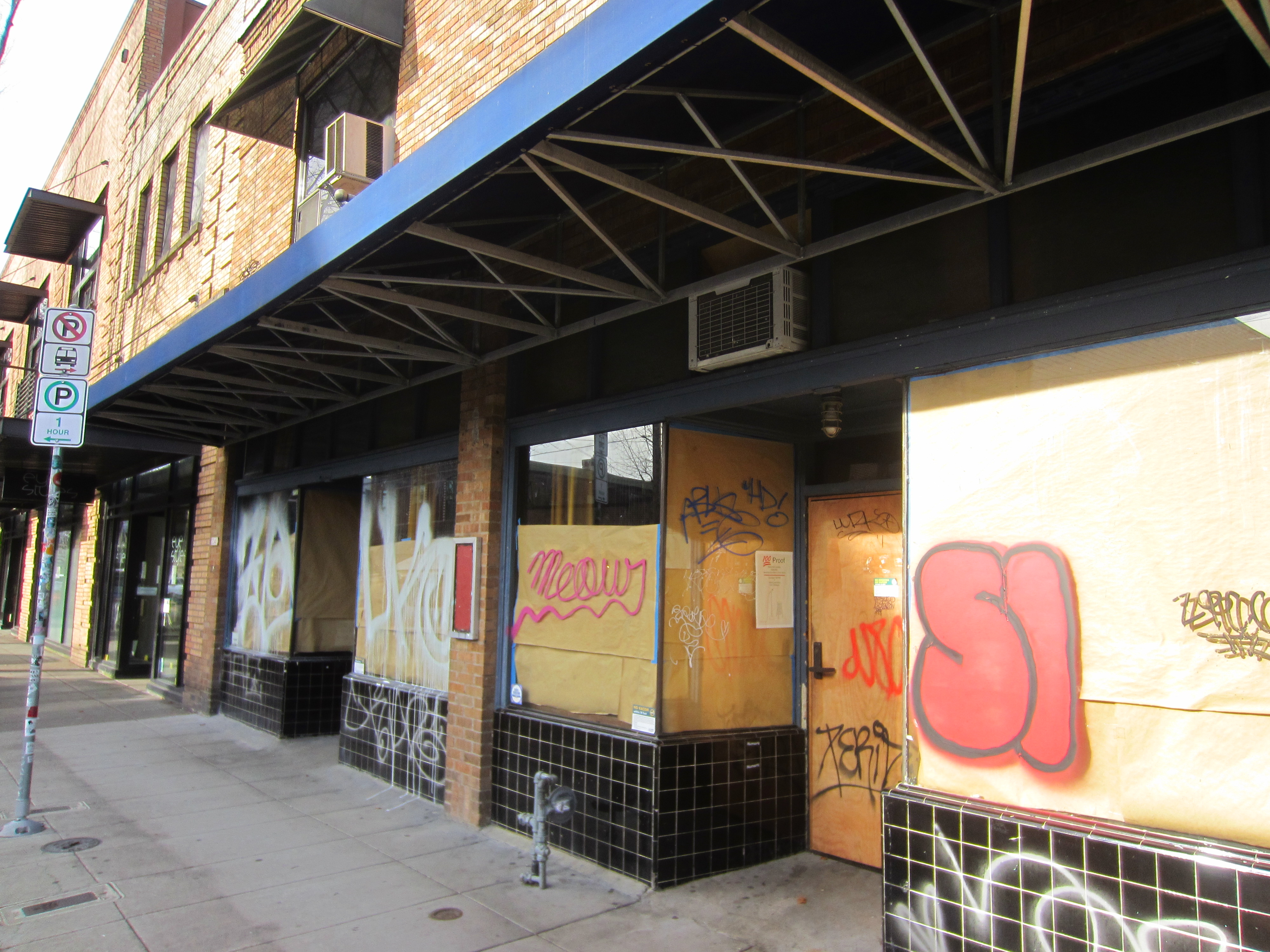
Exterior of the building which housed The Liquor Store in January 2021, during the COVID-19 pandemic

The bar closed temporarily on March 17, 2020, in response to indoor dining restrictions enforced because of the COVID-19 pandemic. DuBois pledged to contribute "a large sum" to a relief fund for furloughed workers created by Morrone. In April, two former employees filed separate lawsuits in Multnomah County Circuit Court alleging misconduct by DuBois was tolerated by management. One sought $750,000 in damages, citing a "hostile" work environment, sexual harassment, and gender discrimination. The other sued for $1 in nominal damages and accused DuBois of assault, battery, and infliction of emotional distress for allegedly sexually assaulting her" at work, and said he "intentionally and forcefully grabbed an intimate part of her body below the waist, with no warning, against her will and without her permission" in 2019. Reporting on the lawsuits, Eater Portland and the Portland Mercury described complaints by other former employees as well, and said DuBois's planned donation to the COVID-19 relief fund would instead be used for legal fees. DuBois had denied all of the accusations of harassment. Morrone told Willamette Week that the bar "always worked very hard to provide a welcoming and safe place for all of our employees and guests" but declined to provide further commentary.

Plans to end the Belmont operation were confirmed in September 2020. Morrone confirmed he was "looking at other locations and opportunities" and said, "I don't foresee a large demand for an underground, basement nightclub anytime soon. But we have a great relationship with the landlord. Who knows what will happen in these strange times." In January 2021, Bar Midnight confirmed plans to move into the space.

== Reception ==
In 2015, Cizmar wrote, "On Saturday nights, the basement is a cramped dance club. But on weeknights, the homey upstairs bar joins with Aalto Lounge across the street to create the best living room/den combination you'll find outside a Hillsdale split level." He said the Blue Monk cocktail was "just a little on the sweet side, but with an acidic bite from lime juice". Portland Business Journal readers said The Liquor Store was among the city's best-named bars. The Liquor Store won in the Best New Bar category in Willamette Week's annual readers' poll in 2015 and 2016. Readers ranked the venue third in the Best Bar category in 2016. In 2017, the newspaper's Walker MacMurdo recommended the cornbread macaroni and cheese and wrote:

On weekend nights, ... Liquor Store may be so packed that a wall of young, hip revelers actually calcify into an impenetrable shield around the bar, glued together by cigarette smoke. The place is actually too cool for you to get a drink, sometimes. Maybe it's the upstairs DJ spinning selections from the hundreds-deep wall of vinyl ... or the house gig eternally raging in the basement venue, but something at the heart of this cozy-but-not-too-cozy everyman bar and sometime-nightclub encourages debauchery. It's like partying at the parental home of a rich friend who doesn't give a shit.

The Portland Mercury included The Liquor Store in a 2019 list of the "best places to check out Portland's music scene". Fodor's Inside Portland (2020) said, "To be clear, this darkly lit drinking and live music venue ... is not an actual liquor store. But it does stock one of the more impressive selections of booze along this youthful stretch of Belmont bars and eateries, and there's a reliably good selection of bar food."

== See also ==
- Culture of Portland, Oregon
- Impact of the COVID-19 pandemic on the music industry
- Impact of the COVID-19 pandemic on the restaurant industry in the United States
