= Blue Monk (Portland, Oregon) =

Defunct bar, restaurant and music venue in Portland, Oregon, U.S.

The Blue Monk
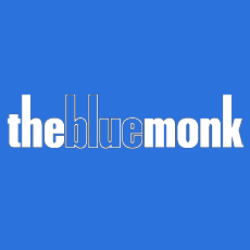
- Logo

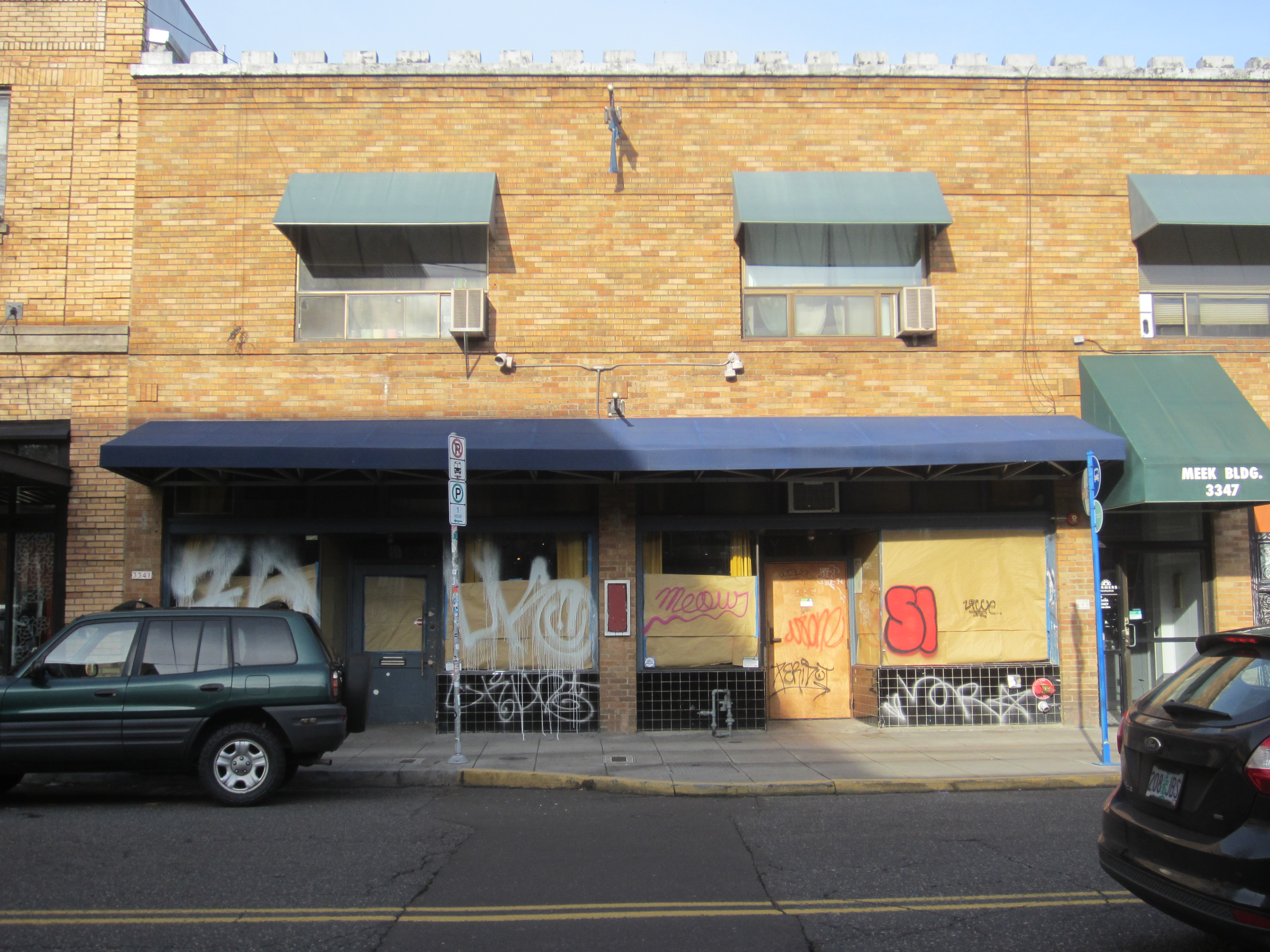
- Exterior of 3341 SE Belmont Street in 2021, during the COVID-19 pandemic; the building housed the Blue Monk and later The Liquor Store
- Interactive map of The Blue Monk
- Address: 3341 Southeast Belmont Street
- Location: Portland, Oregon, United States
- Coordinates: 45.51658°N 122.63000°W
- Owner: Sheri Dietrich
- Type: Bar; music venue; restaurant

Construction
- Closed: April 29, 2014

The Blue Monk was a bar, music venue, and restaurant in southeast Portland, Oregon, in the United States. Upstairs featured a restaurant with an open kitchen serving mostly Italian cuisine, while downstairs hosted music performances in a variety of genres, but mostly jazz. The business closed in April 2014 after its lease was bought out by an undisclosed party.

== Description ==
The Blue Monk was a bar and music venue located at 3341 Southeast Belmont Street, in the Belmont retail and residential district in southeast Portland's Sunnyside neighborhood. The venue mostly hosted a variety of music performances, but mostly jazz, the inspiration of its name. In her book Insiders' Guide to Portland, Oregon, Rachel Dresbeck offers the following description of the venue:

The Blue Monk started out as a jazz venue but has now expanded into related genres—including swing dancing and belly dancing... The Blue Monk has a good happy hour, good free pool, and a good cheap cover as well. Upstairs is a fetching contemporary room with an open kitchen, where cooks are busy preparing spaghetti, shrimp scampi, and other mostly Italian dishes. Downstairs, Portland's finest musicians are jamming.

== History ==
In March 2014, members of Portland Police Bureau's Gang Enforcement Team, who were reportedly responding to the fire marshal's report of overcrowding, limited venue access and blocked off the street during a concert scheduled to be headlined by battle rapper and hip hop artist Illmaculate. However, to protest the police presence, Illmaculate left the venue before taking the stage, ending the basement show early. Following the incident, the rapper tweeted, "I will not perform in this city as long as the blatant targeting of black culture and minorities congregating is acceptable common practice." The show's disruption contributed to recent accusations from the local hip hop community that Portland Police was executing an "ongoing, targeted assault" on rap shows.

In April 2014, the bar's lease was bought out by an undisclosed party. The Blue Monk closed permanently on April 29, and was replaced by The Liquor Store. Personnel offered little explanation, but said on Facebook:

After over a decade of providing entertainment to the Belmont area, The Blue Monk will be closing its doors on Tuesday, April 29th. We are proud to have become possibly the most diverse venue in Portland with a little bit of something for everyone, including poetry, literary events, belly dance, comedy, pop, folk, bluegrass, swing, rock, funk, soul, electronica, hip-hop, and of course, jazz. There is just one week to stop by to say farewell, check out some great live music, and/or enjoy your favorite menu items. We would love to see you before we go and extend a heartfelt thank you to all of the customers, performers, promoters, and employees that have made us who we are.

== See also ==
- Culture of Portland, Oregon
- List of defunct restaurants of the United States
- List of Italian restaurants
- List of jazz venues in the United States
