= Belmont Inn =

Bar in Portland, Oregon, U.S.

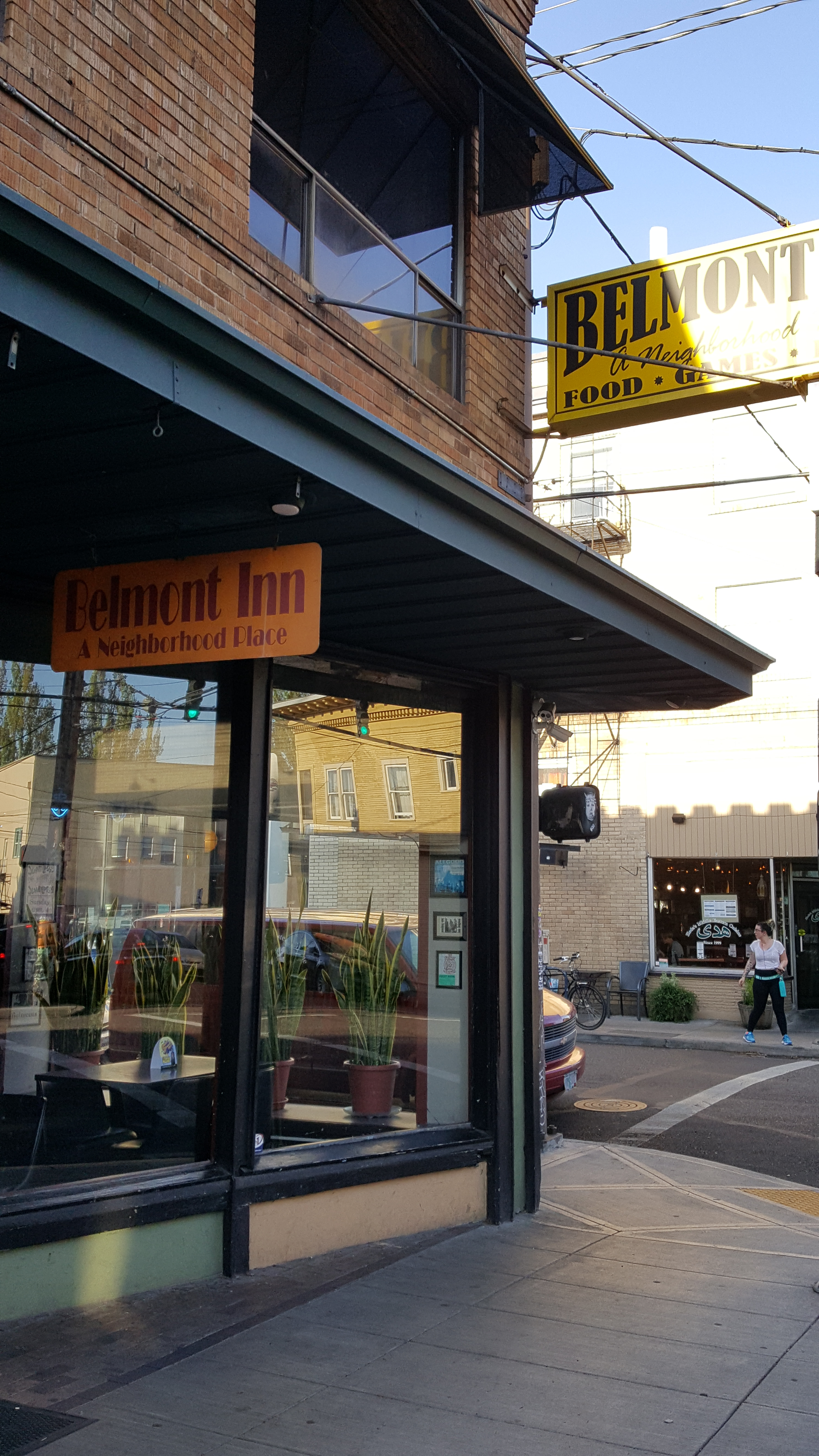
- The bar's exterior, 2018
- Interactive map of Belmont Inn
- Address: 3357 SE Belmont Street; Portland, Oregon; United States
- Coordinates: 45.51651°N 122.6297°W
- Owner: Matthew B. Traxler

Website
- belmontsinn.com

The Belmont Inn, or simply Belmont's, is a bar along Belmont Street in the district of the same name within southeast Portland, Oregon's Sunnyside neighborhood. Owned by Seth Leavens, the bar has pool, darts, a jukebox, and video poker.

== History ==
Matthew B. Traxler owned the bar, as of 1994. In March 1994, a beverage manager was shot in the head and killed after closing the bar. Two people were charged and sent to prison.

In 1996, the bar hosted a wake for Berton E. Green, known as the "Baron of Belmont". In August, Traxler expressed frustration with new development in the area, when neighboring Belmont Dairy was converted into apartments and retail spaces. He said limited parking for months at a time due to construction had a negative impact on his business and questioned the selection of Zupan's grocery for the neighborhood.

In the late 1990s, the bar was tagged by a Reed College student known for writing "Maul" in graffiti. She was fined for her prolific work across Portland.

The bar has hosted trivia nights. British Pub Quiz and Pub Quiz Oregon were held weekly, as of 2005 and 2006, respectively.

In 2020, during the COVID-19 pandemic, the business supported a proposed plan to convert several blocks along Southeast Belmont Street into an outdoor dining area.
