= Circa 33 =

Bar and restaurant in Portland, Oregon, U.S.

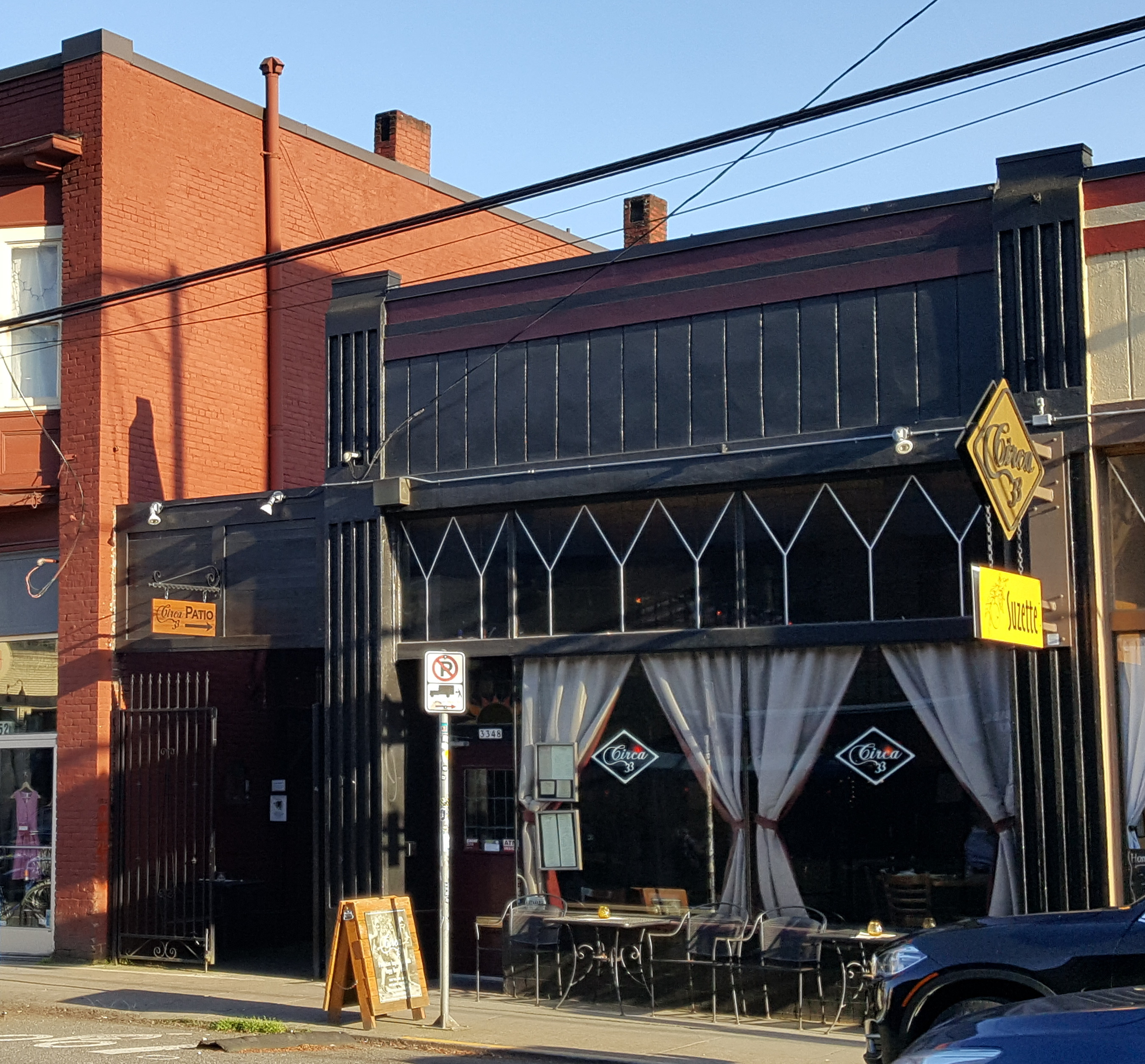
- The bar's exterior in 2018
- Interactive map of Circa 33

Restaurant information
- Established: 2010
- Closed: September 26, 2021
- Location: 3348 SE Belmont Street, Portland, Oregon, 97214, United States
- Coordinates: 45.5164°N 122.6300°W
- Website: circa33.com

Circa 33 was a bar and restaurant in southeast Portland, Oregon's Sunnyside neighborhood, in the United States.

== Description ==
Thrillist describes Circa 33 as a speakeasy with "classic" cocktails, pool, and darts. Circa 33 had a "secret bar" and a wrap-around patio.

== History ==
Circa 33 opened in October 2010. The bar was operated by the restaurant group Independent Restaurant Concepts. Joshua Johnston has also been credited as a co-owner.

The bar participated in The Oregonian's Dumpling Week in 2018, 2019, and 2020.

Circa 33 was among local businesses in the Rose City Downtown Collective seeking support in 2020, following the COVID-19 pandemic and George Floyd protests. In August 2020, when Circa 33 was closed because of the pandemic, the bar's alleyway and back patio hosted a "gin-centric pop-up bar" called Gin Alley. Gin Alley served strawberry-and-pepper gin fizzes, hazelnut mai tais, and martinis. Circa 33 also supported a proposed plan to convert several blocks along Southeast Belmont Street into an outdoor dining area.

Circa 33 closed in September 2021.

== Reception ==
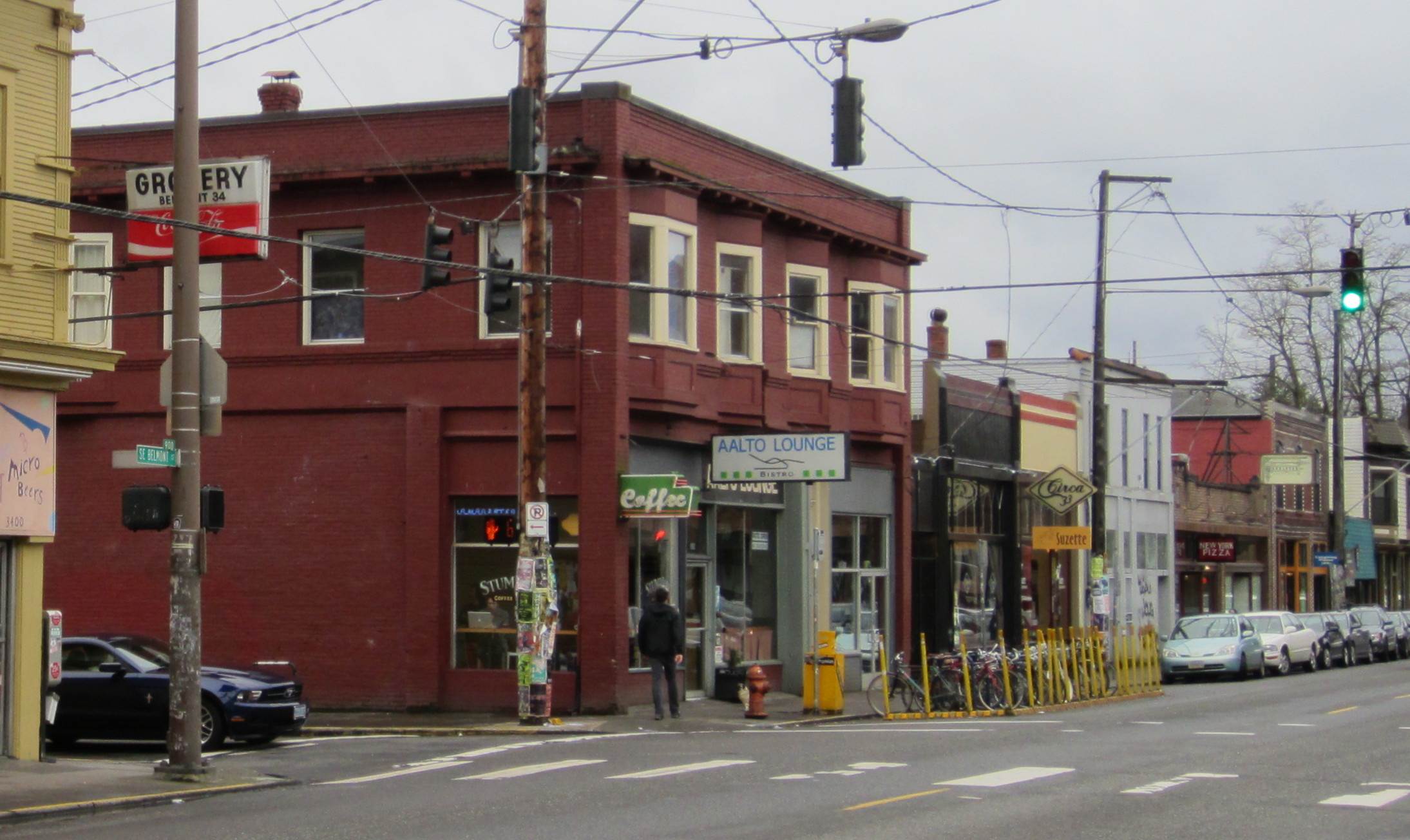
Exterior of Circa 33 and neighboring Aalto Lounge, 2012

Adam Lapetina of Thrillist included Circa 33 in his 2013 overview of "How to get into the 14 best speakeasies in America". Writers for Business Insider included the bar in 2014 and 2015 lists of the "coolest speakeasies" in the United States.

In 2020, Eater Portland's Brooke Jackson-Glidden included Circa 33 in her overview of "Where to Throw a Bachelorette Party in Portland". Zagat gives Circa 33 ratings of 4.5 and 4.4 out of 5 for decor and service, respectively, and says, "This cool, dark Prohibition-themed Sunnyside lounge boasts a towering liquor shelf accessed by a library ladder, as well as outstanding classic cocktails at moderate prices; the service is usually excellent, and the awesome semi-covered alleyway patio and back-area speakeasy hidden behind a swinging bookshelf are added benefits."
