= Dick's Kitchen =

Defunct restaurant in Portland, Oregon, US

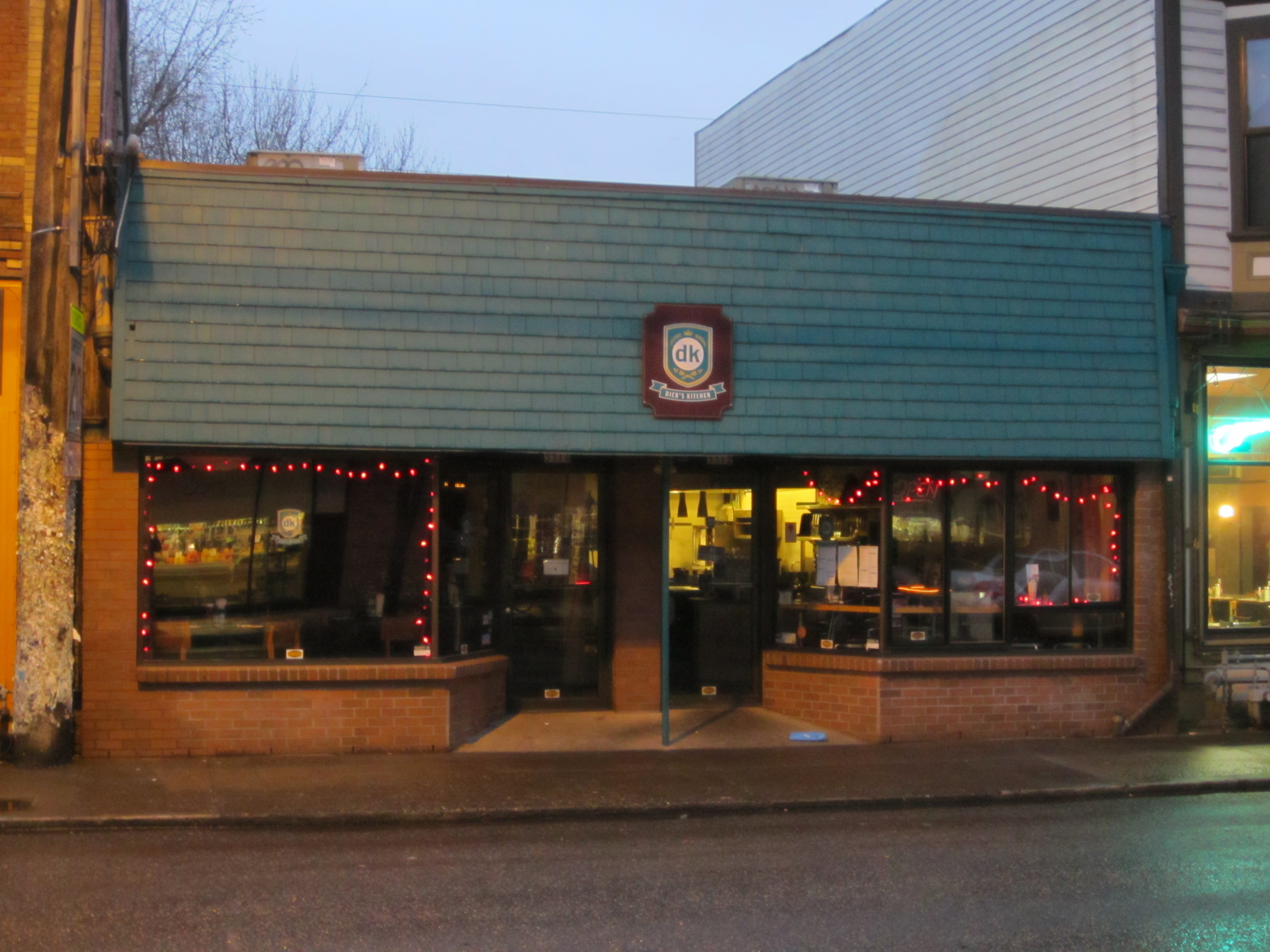
- Exterior of the Southeast Belmont restaurant in 2012

Restaurant information
- Owner: Richard Satnick
- Location: Portland, Multnomah, Oregon, United States

Dick's Kitchen was a "paleo-friendly" restaurant with multiple locations in Portland, Oregon, United States.

== Description ==
The high-vegetable, low-grain menu offered gluten-free, paleo, and vegan options, including burgers, sandwiches, sausages, and desserts. The interior of the southeast Portland restaurant was decorated with portraits of notable men named Richard, including Dick Van Dyke, Richard Burton, and Richard Nixon. Drinks at the northwest Portland location included the Dick's-A-Rita and Dick's Elixir.

== History ==
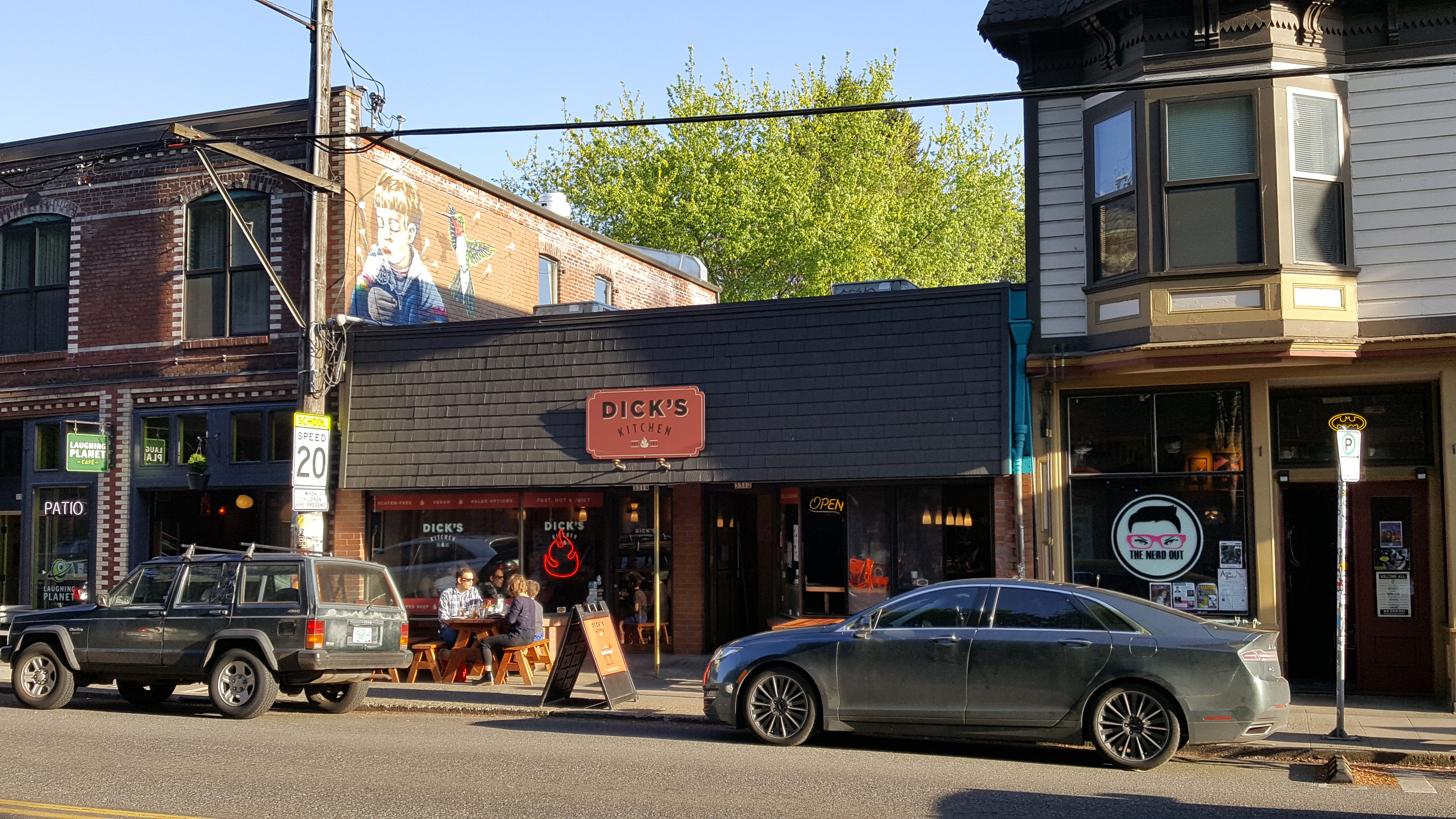
Exterior of the Belmont location in 2018

Richard Satnick opened the first restaurant on Southeast Belmont in the Sunnyside neighborhood in August 2010. He opened a second restaurant in northwest Portland in late 2011, in a space which previously housed Lucy's Table. Meat was sourced from Carmen Ranch in Wallowa, Oregon, as of 2014. The "sister-restaurant" Dick's Primal Burger opened in southeast Portland's Woodstock neighborhood in 2015, offering counter service.

The Dick's Kitchen in Sunnyside closed and was replaced by Taqueria Los Puñales. The outpost in northwest Portland closed and the space was later occupied by the Indian restaurant Bhuna.

== Reception ==
In 2016 and 2017, Dick's won in the Best Paleo Options category in Willamette Week's annual readers' poll. The restaurant won second place in the same category in 2020.
