= Taqueria Los Puñales =

Mexican restaurant in Portland, Oregon, U.S.

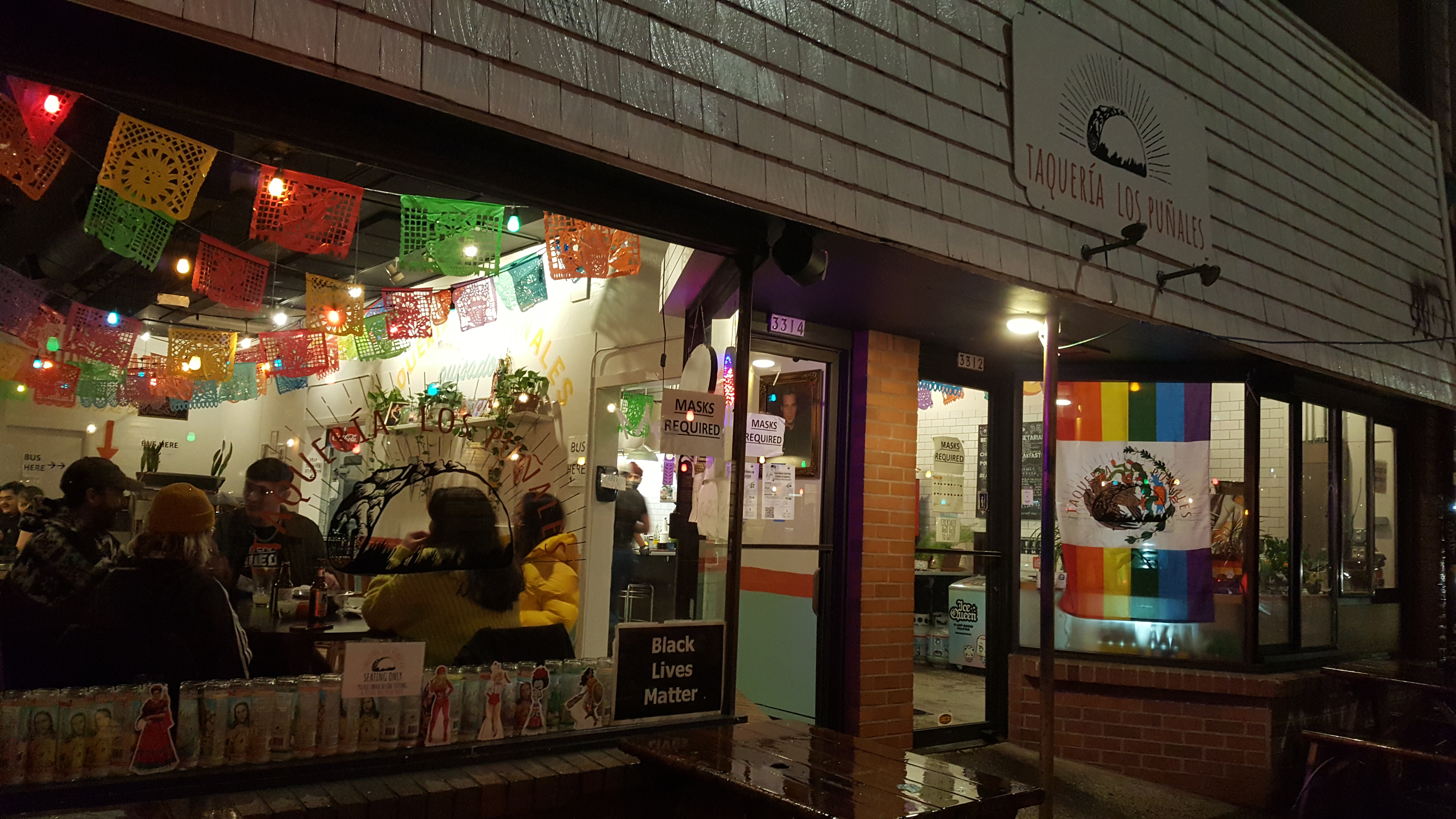
- The restaurant's exterior in 2022
- Interactive map of Taqueria Los Puñales

Restaurant information
- Established: June 2020
- Owners: Brian Aster; David Madrigal
- Food type: Mexican
- Location: 3312 Southeast Belmont Street, Portland, Multnomah, Oregon, 97214, United States
- Coordinates: 45.5163°N 122.6306°W
- Website: lospunales.com

Taqueria Los Puñales is a queer-owned and operated Mexican restaurant in Portland, Oregon, United States. Opened by Brian Aster and David Madrigal in southeast Portland's Sunnyside neighborhood in 2020, during the COVID-19 pandemic, the restaurant has a colorful interior and serves traditional cuisine such as tacos, adobada, barbacoa, chile rellenos, and agua fresca. The business has garnered a generally positive reception.

== Description ==
Taqueria Los Puñales is a queer-owned and operated Mexican restaurant on Belmont Street in southeast Portland's Sunnyside neighborhood. Named after a gay slur which the business's owners have reclaimed, Brooke Jackson-Glidden of Eater Portland has described Taqueria Los Puñales as "vocally and transparently queer", and Mey Rude of Out Traveler has called the restaurant "unapologetically queer".

The Oregonian's Michael Russell has described the restaurant as "friendly" and "colorful". The interior features prints by queer Mexican artist Felix d'Eon, framed portraits of Mariah Carey, Verónica Castro, Gia Gunn, and Marsha P. Johnson, pennants, and photographs of RuPaul. The menu includes more than 20 taco options as well as adobada, barbacoa, chile rellenos, guisados, tinga, and house-made tortillas. Drink options include beer, cocktails, margaritas, agua fresca, and Jarritos.

== History ==
Friends Brian Aster and David Madrigal opened the restaurant in June 2020, during the COVID-19 pandemic, in a space which previously housed a Dick's Kitchen restaurant. Branding and lettering were completed by trans indigenous artist Kennedy Barrera-Cruz and local lesbian artist Shelbee Smith, respectively. According to Out Traveler's Mey Rude, Taqueria Los Puñales was the first and only gay taqueria operating in North America, as of 2020. Sometimes staff distribute stickers with the text "Gay Tacos".

In 2024, a man threw his skateboard at one of the restaurant's windows. A community member patched up the broken window before employees discovered the damage.

== Reception ==
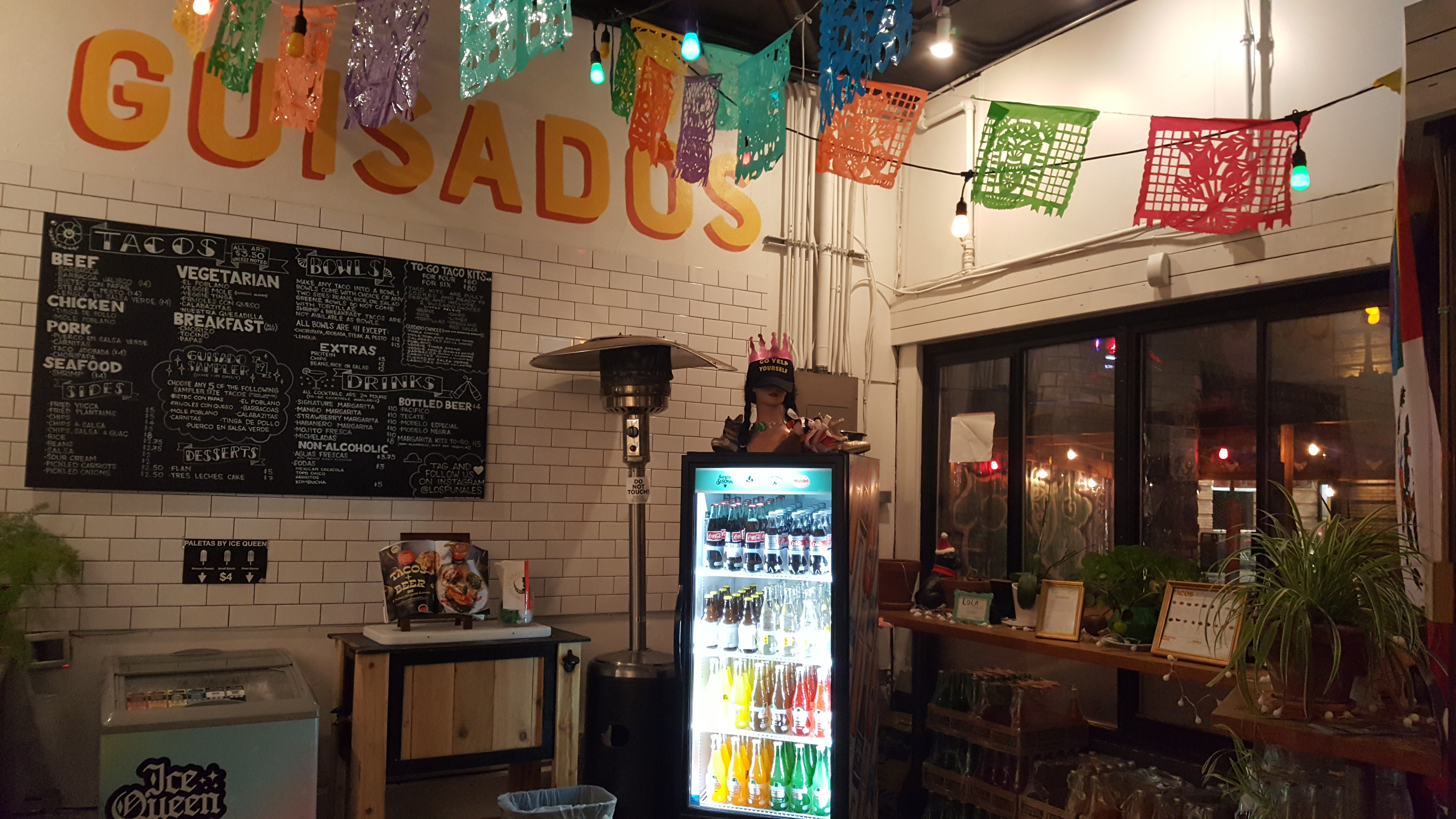
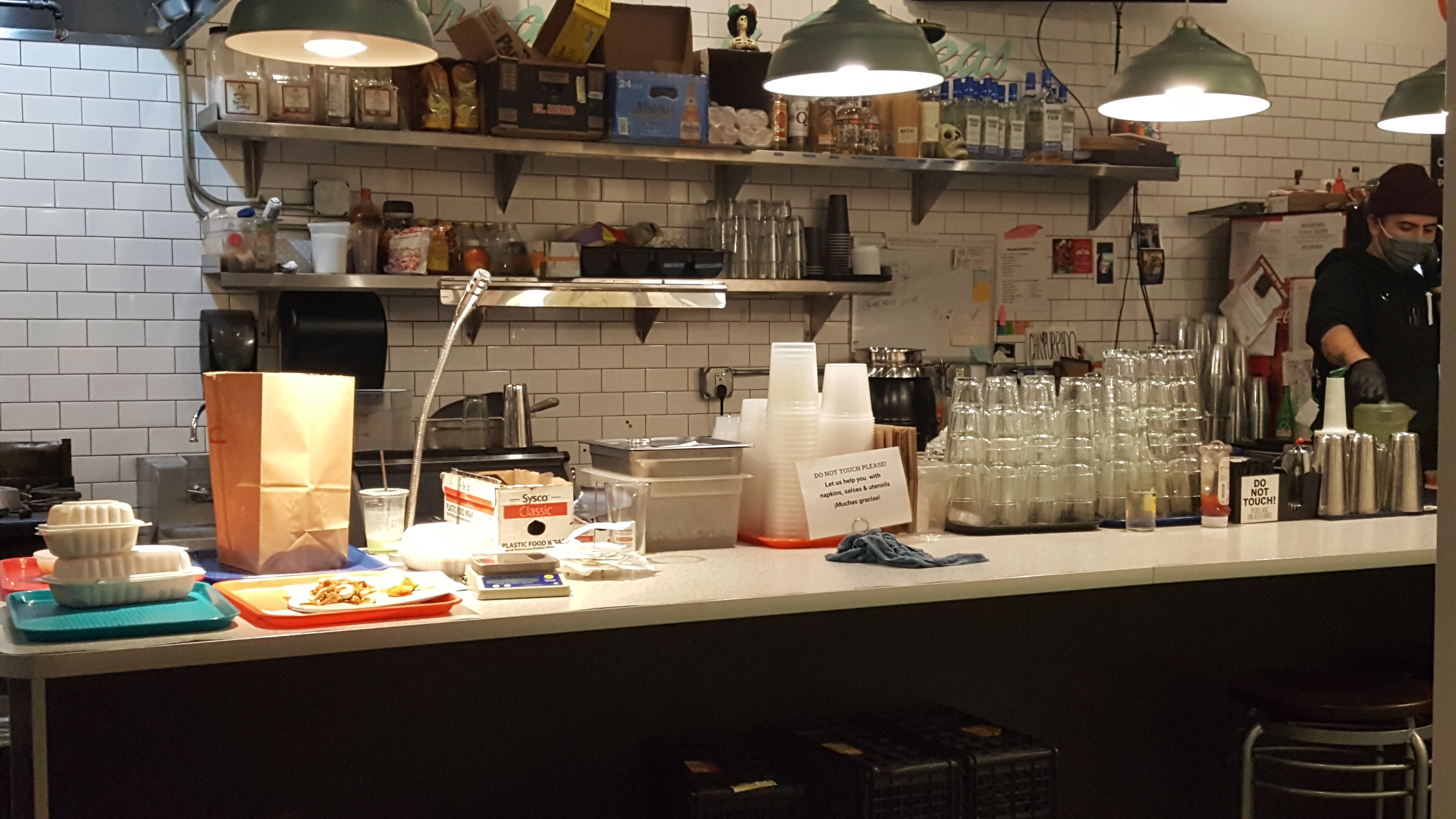
The restaurant's interior, 2022

In 2020, Katherine Chew Hamilton of Portland Monthly called the restaurant a "standout" of the year and wrote, "Taqueria Los Puñales makes some of the best tacos I've had in Portland—I particularly love the choripapas and the barbacoa." She and Tuck Woodstock included the taqueria in the magazine's 2021 overview of Portland's "very best" tacos. She also included the business in the magazine's 2023 overview of the city's best Mexican food. Karen Brooks and Hamilton included Taqueria Los Puñales in the magazine's 2022 list of Portland's 50 best restaurants. In 2021, Bill Oakley said Taqueria Los Puñales was his favorite taco restaurant in Portland.

Seiji Nanbu and Brooke Jackson-Glidden included the business in Eater Portland's 2021 list of fifteen "outstanding" taco eateries in the city. The duo wrote, "Los Puñales has easily become a staple taqueria in Portland... While the classic guisados here are great, the beauty of Los Puñales lies in the more unconventional fillings like the garlicky steak al pesto and fried Chile relleno." In 2022, Nanbu and Krista Garcia included Taqueria Los Puñales in Eater Portland's list of the city's seventeen "standout" Mexican restaurants and food carts, and Nanbu and Nathan Williams included the business in a list of twenty-two "outstanding" taco options in the Portland metropolitan area. In 2022, the restaurant was the highest rated in Portland for tacos, based on Yelp ratings and reviews. Taqueria Los Puñales ranked second in the Best Mexican Restaurant category and was a runner-up in the Best Taco category of Willamette Week's annual 'Best of Portland' readers' poll in 2024. The business won in the Best Taco category of the same poll in 2025.

== See also ==
- Hispanics and Latinos in Portland, Oregon
- List of Mexican restaurants
