= Dick's Primal Burger =

Restaurant in Portland, Oregon, U.S.

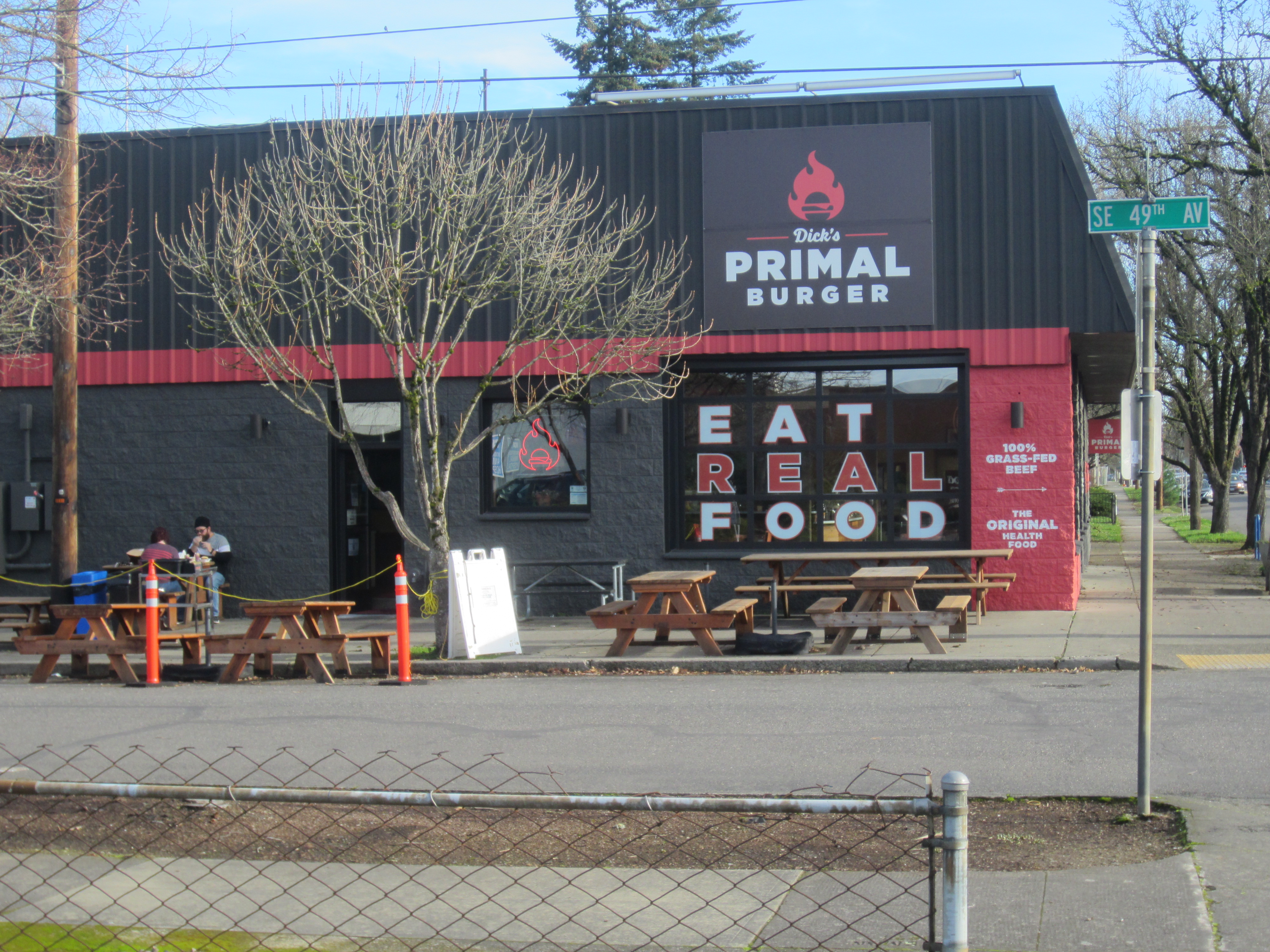
- Exterior of the restaurant in southeast Portland's Woodstock neighborhood, 2021
- Interactive map of Dick's Primal Burger

Restaurant information
- Owner: Richard Satnick
- Location: Portland, Oregon, United States
- Coordinates: 45.4793°N 122.6123°W
- Website: dicksprimalburger.com

Dick's Primal Burger is a restaurant in Portland, Oregon, United States.

== Description ==
The restaurant Dick's Primal Burger is located on Woodstock Boulevard in southeast Portland's Woodstock neighborhood. It previously also operated on North Williams Avenue in the Boise neighborhood, and on Northeast Cully Boulevard in the Cully neighborhood.

Considered a "sister-restaurant" to Dick's Kitchen with counter service for lunch and dinner, the menu has included burgers, bowls, soups, salads, and sides such as French fries. The Salmon Nation is a salmon burger and the Woodstock is a veggie burger. The BYO Burger allows patrons to select preferred choices of meat (venison and boar), cheese (blue, cheddar, goat, Swiss), and toppings (grilled onions, kimchi, or pineapple). The Cobb bowl has turkey, bacon, avocado, blue cheese, and tomato. The chili has beef, organic red beans, cumin, and smoked paprika.

For Burger Week in 2022, the restaurant's Dick's on Fire included beef, Tillamook Pepper Jack cheese, Ghost Scream ghost pepper jam, serrano peppers, roasted garlic aioli, and gluten-free crispy onions. The restaurant also serves alcoholic milkshakes, including the Oregon Special with hazelnut liqueur and an Irish coffee with salted caramel.

== History ==
Owner Richard Satnick opened Dick's Primal Burger in Woodstock in November 2015.

== Reception ==
Chad Walsh included Dick's Primal Burger in Eater Portland's 2016 list of "top quality fast food spots in Portland". The website's Maya MacEvoy included the chili in a 2021 list of "where to find bowls of captivating chili in Portland and beyond" and a 2022 list of "where to find wildly tasty game burgers" in the city.

== See also ==
- List of hamburger restaurants
