= Aalto Lounge =

Bar in Portland, Oregon, U.S.

- Logo

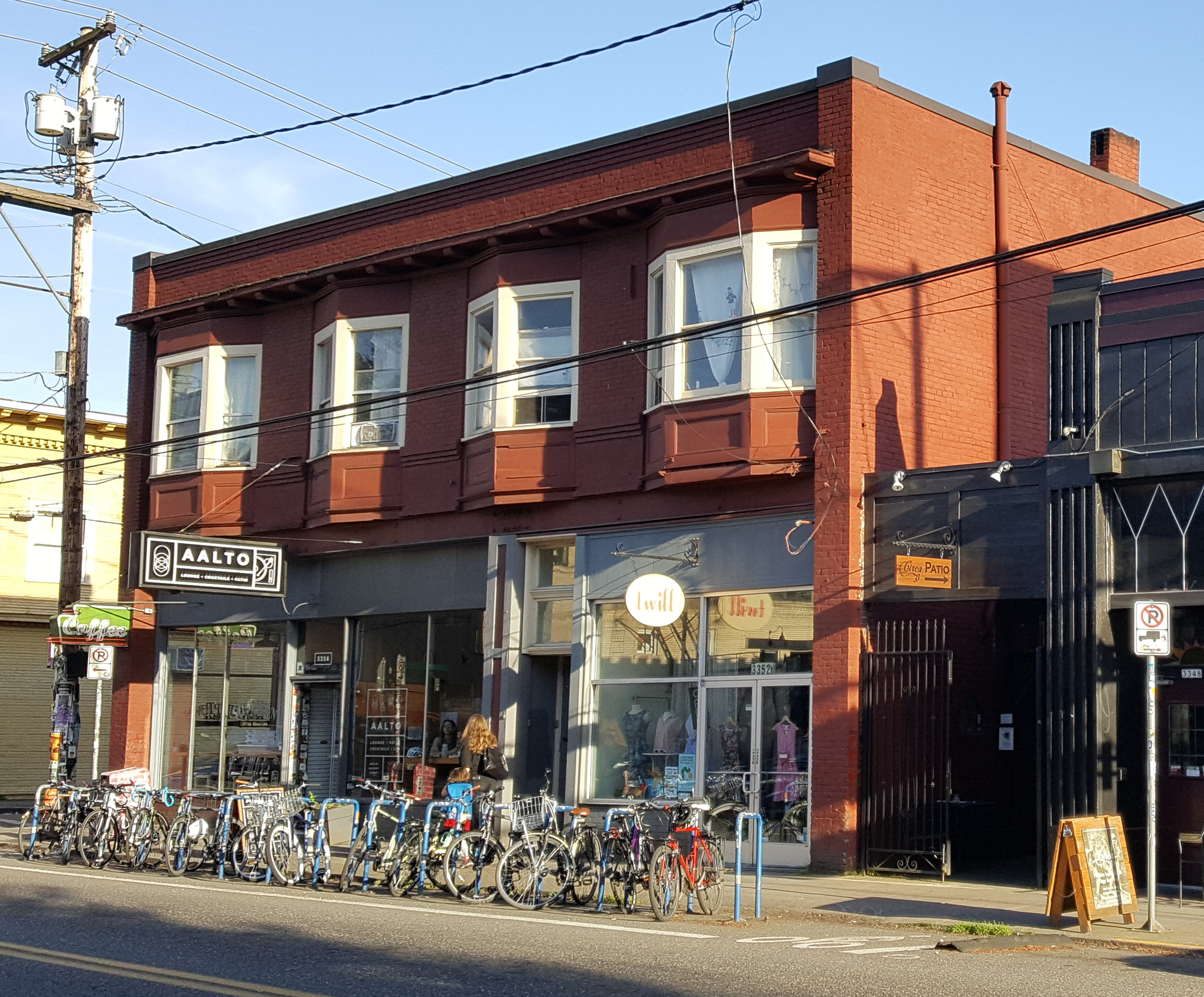
- The bar's exterior in 2018
- Interactive map of Aalto Lounge
- Address: 3356 Southeast Belmont Street; Portland, Oregon; United States
- Coordinates: 45°30′58.6″N 122°37′47.2″W

Aalto Lounge is a bar in Portland, Oregon. Named after Finnish architect and designer Alvar Aalto, the bar opened in 2000.

== Description ==
Aalto Lounge is a bar along Belmont Street in the district of the same name within southeast Portland's Sunnyside neighborhood. Willamette Week has said the bar as a "sleek, midcentury modern vibe" with DJs, cocktails, and a secluded backroom. The newspaper's Pete Cottell said the Aalto Lounge has a "sleek, cavernous atmosphere that makes everyone inside look 20 percent sexier". Named after Finnish architect and designer Alvar Aalto, the interior has mid-century Scandinavian furnishings. Portland Monthly has described the bar as "on the border between dive bar and hipster hangout".

== History ==
Owned by Alex and Kate Wood, the bar opened in 2000. Closed for several months during the COVID-19 pandemic, Aalto Lounge had socially distanced service inside and on the patio, as of September–October 2020.

== Reception ==
Aalto Lounge was included in Willamette Week's 2016 list of "Portland's Best Patio Bars for Happy Hour". Aalto Lounge ranked second in the Best Date Bar and Best Happy Hour categories in the newspaper's 'Best of Portland' readers' poll in 2020. It was a runner-up and winner in the Best Happy Hour category in 2022 and 2025, respectively. Eater Portland's Alex Frane included the bar in his 2019 overview of the city's "most iconic" cocktails. In 2020, the website's Brooke Jackson-Glidden recommended the bar for bachelorette parties.
