= F. M. Knight Building =

Historic building in Portland, Oregon, U.S.

- U.S. National Register of Historic Places
- Portland Historic Landmark
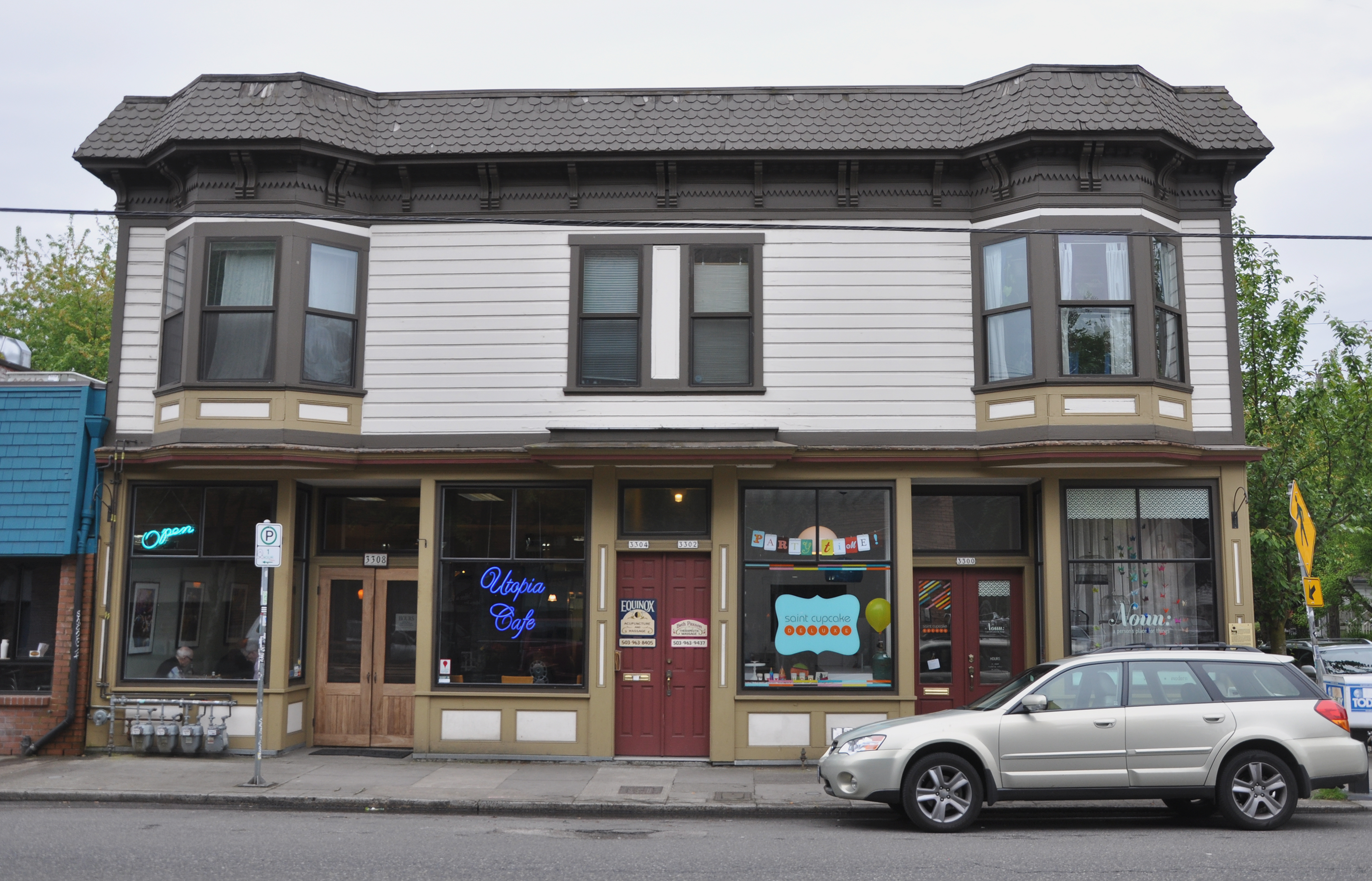
- The Knight Building in 2011
- Location: 3300 SE Belmont Street; Portland, Oregon
- Coordinates: 45°30′59″N 122°37′51″W
- Area: 50 by 60 feet (15 by 18 m)
- Built: about 1890
- Architectural style: Italianate
- MPS: Portland Eastside
- NRHP reference No.: 89000086
- Added to NRHP: March 8, 1989

The F. M. Knight Building in southeast Portland in the U.S. state of Oregon is a two-story general commercial building listed on the National Register of Historic Places. Built in an Italianate style in about 1890, it was added to the register in 1989.

The building is a wood-frame structure erected in the late 19th century to house businesses serving the Sunnyside neighborhood. Exterior features of the 50-by-60-foot (15 by 18 m) building include a cornice and overhanging 3-foot (0.9 m) parapet along the front (north) face. The second-floor north face has a central pair of double-hung sash windows flanked by two polygonal bays, each with three sash windows. Three doors and four display windows on the first floor face Belmont Street. The door in the center leads to a stairway to the second floor.

== History ==
Southeast Portland grew rapidly between 1883 and 1910 after the opening of bridges linking the city's west side with sparsely populated areas across the Willamette River. Early streetcar routes led east from the bridges, and one of them followed Belmont Street. The Sunnyside neighborhood, platted by the Sunnyside Land and Improvement Company in 1888, was the first development along an eastside streetcar route. Its shopping center included the Knight Building. Few similar buildings from this era remain in southeast Portland; most have been replaced by larger or more sturdy structures.

Although the exact date of construction and the name of the builder are unknown, deed records suggest that J.S. Winslow was the builder. He bought the property from the Sunnyside Land and Improvement Company, then sold it a few months later, in 1889, to Deborah Kent. She sold it in 1895 to J.S. McDaniel, who owned it through 1915. City directories say that a post office was located on part of the first floor from 1898 through 1911.

== See also ==
- National Register of Historic Places listings in Southeast Portland, Oregon
