= John M. Wallace Fourplex =

Historic building in Portland, Oregon, U.S.

- U.S. National Register of Historic Places
- Portland Historic Landmark
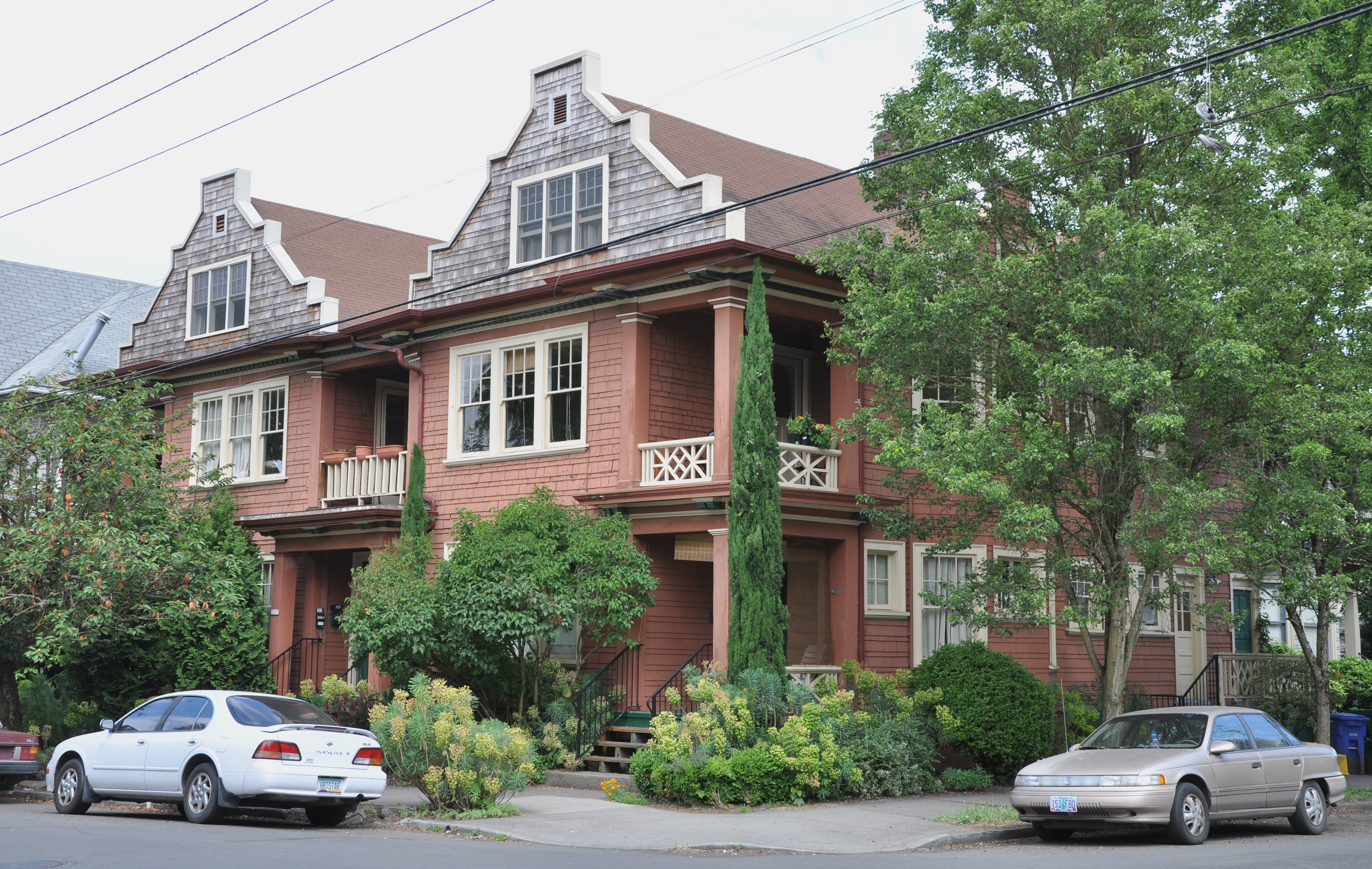
- The Wallace Fourplex in 2011

- Location within Portland, Oregon
- Location: 3645–3655 SE Yamhill Street; Portland, Oregon
- Coordinates: 45°30′57″N 122°37′34″W
- Built: 1915
- Architect: John Wallace
- Architectural style: Bungalow/Craftsman
- MPS: Portland Eastside MPS
- NRHP reference No.: 89000101
- Added to NRHP: May 8, 1989

The John M. Wallace Fourplex is a building complex located in southeast Portland, Oregon, United States. It is listed on the National Register of Historic Places.

== See also ==
- National Register of Historic Places listings in Southeast Portland, Oregon
