= Belmont, Portland, Oregon =

Neighborhood in Portland, Oregon, United States

Coordinates: 45.5165°N 122.62°W

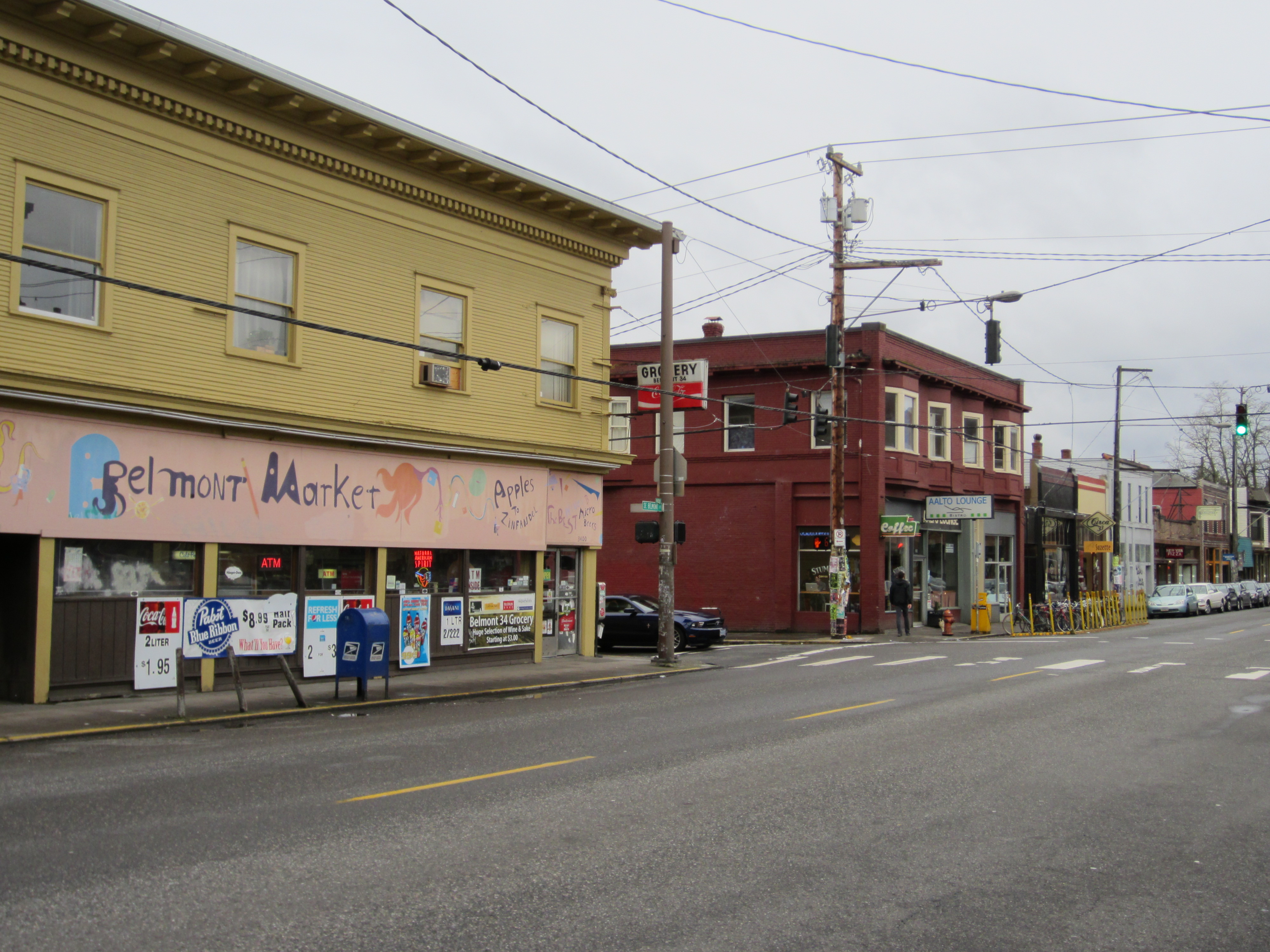
Shops on Belmont Street

The Belmont Area is a retail and residential district running along SE Belmont St. in the inner Southeast section of Portland, Oregon in a parallel fashion to the Hawthorne District, 6 blocks to the south. From west to east the area extends 48 blocks, from SE 12th Ave. to SE 60th Ave., passing through the Buckman, Sunnyside, and Mount Tabor neighborhoods. The area is seven blocks wide, running from SE Belmont St. 4 blocks north to SE Stark St. and 3 blocks south to SE Salmon St. SE Belmont St. between SE 33rd Ave. and SE 35th Ave., in Sunnyside, is the heart of the district.

The area developed around the first trolley line in East Portland, established in 1888 (and converted to a bus line in 1949).
