= Sunnyside, Portland, Oregon =

Sunnyside
- Neighborhood
- Location in Portland
- Coordinates: 45°30′59″N 122°37′39″W
- Country: United States
- State: Oregon
- City: Portland

Government
  - Association: Sunnyside Neighborhood Association
  - Coalition: Southeast Uplift

Area
  - Total: 0.60 sq mi (1.55 km^{2})

Population (2000)
  - Total: 7,155
  - Density: 12,000/sq mi (4,620/km^{2})

Housing
  - No. of households: 3,487
  - Occupancy rate: 95% occupied
  - Owner-occupied: 1,230 households (35%)
  - Renting: 2,257 households (65%)
  - Avg. household size: 2.05 persons

Sunnyside is a neighborhood in the south east section of Portland, between SE Stark Street and SE Hawthorne Blvd. (north to south) and from SE 28th Ave. to SE 49th Ave. (west to east). The Sunnyside Neighborhood motto is "Proud Past, Bright Future". Sunnyside has a "strong sense of Portland individuality" with many locally owned coffee shops and businesses. Sunnyside is bordered by Laurelhurst to the north, Richmond to the south, Buckman to the west, and Mount Tabor to the east. Because of its Victorian architecture and bohemian culture, Hawthorne/Belmont is often compared to San Francisco's Haight Ashbury district. Sunnyside has been called Portland's "uncontested champion of eco-consciousness".

== Points of interest ==
Peacock Lane, running north and south between Stark and Belmont, is a street known locally for lavish Christmas decorations and displays.

The Sunnyside Piazza, at the intersection of SE 33rd and Yamhill, includes a huge sunflower painted on the road. This was one of Portland's first city repair projects. Residents have gathered to repaint the intersection every Memorial Day weekend since 2000.

== Architecture ==
Sunnyside Architectural Gallery

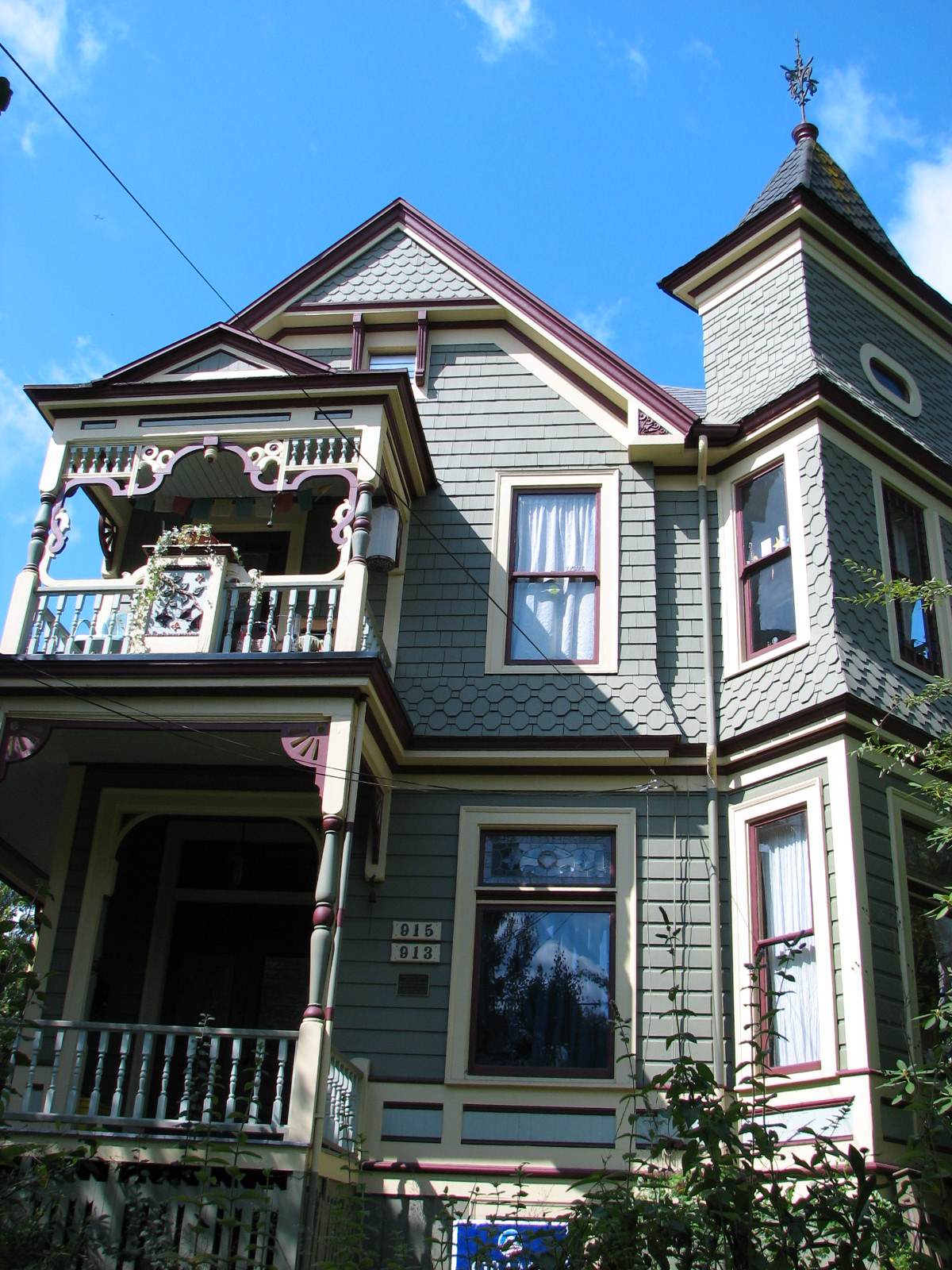
Thaddeus Fisher House

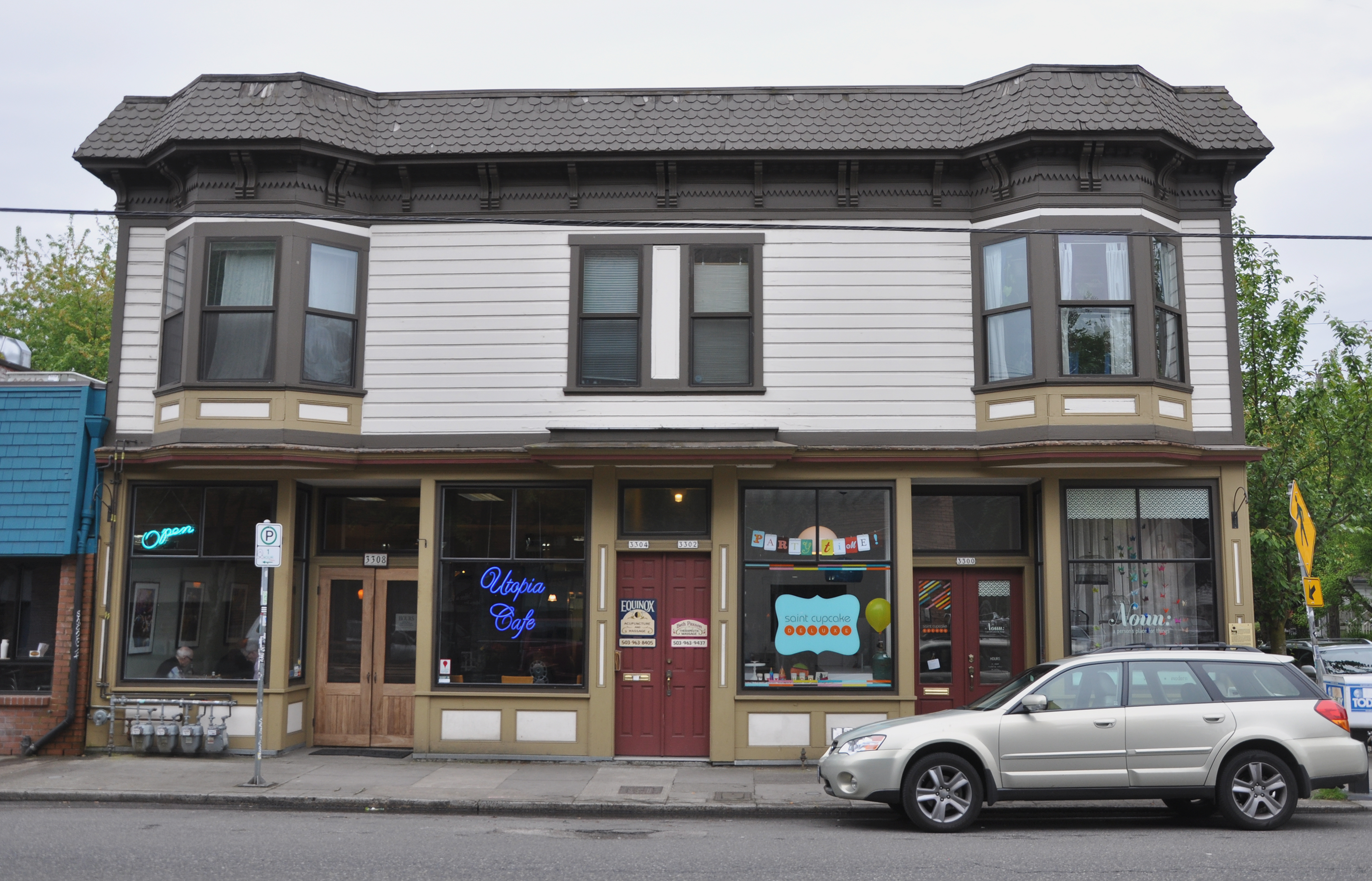
F.M. Knight Building

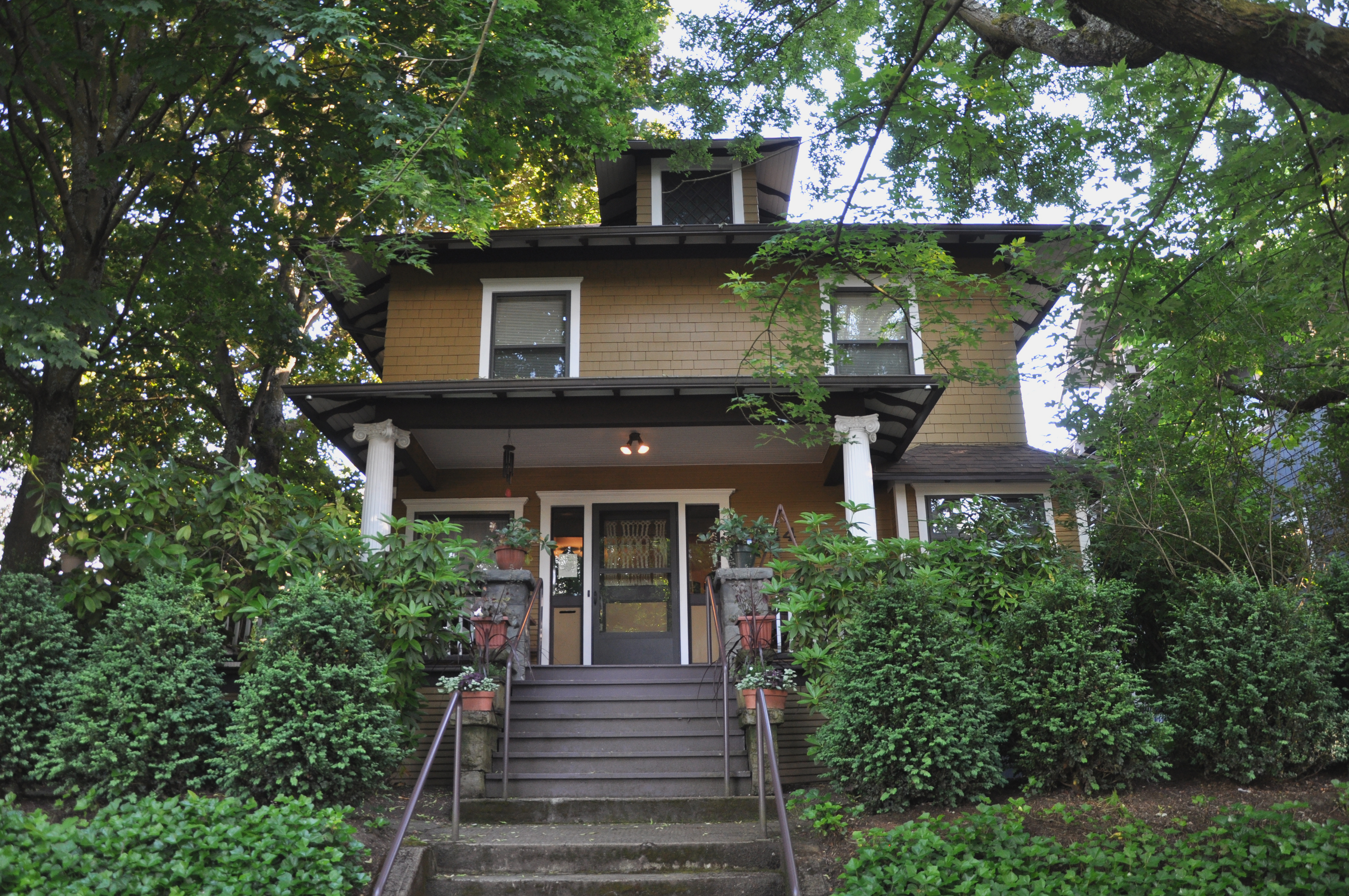
Jessie M. Raymond House

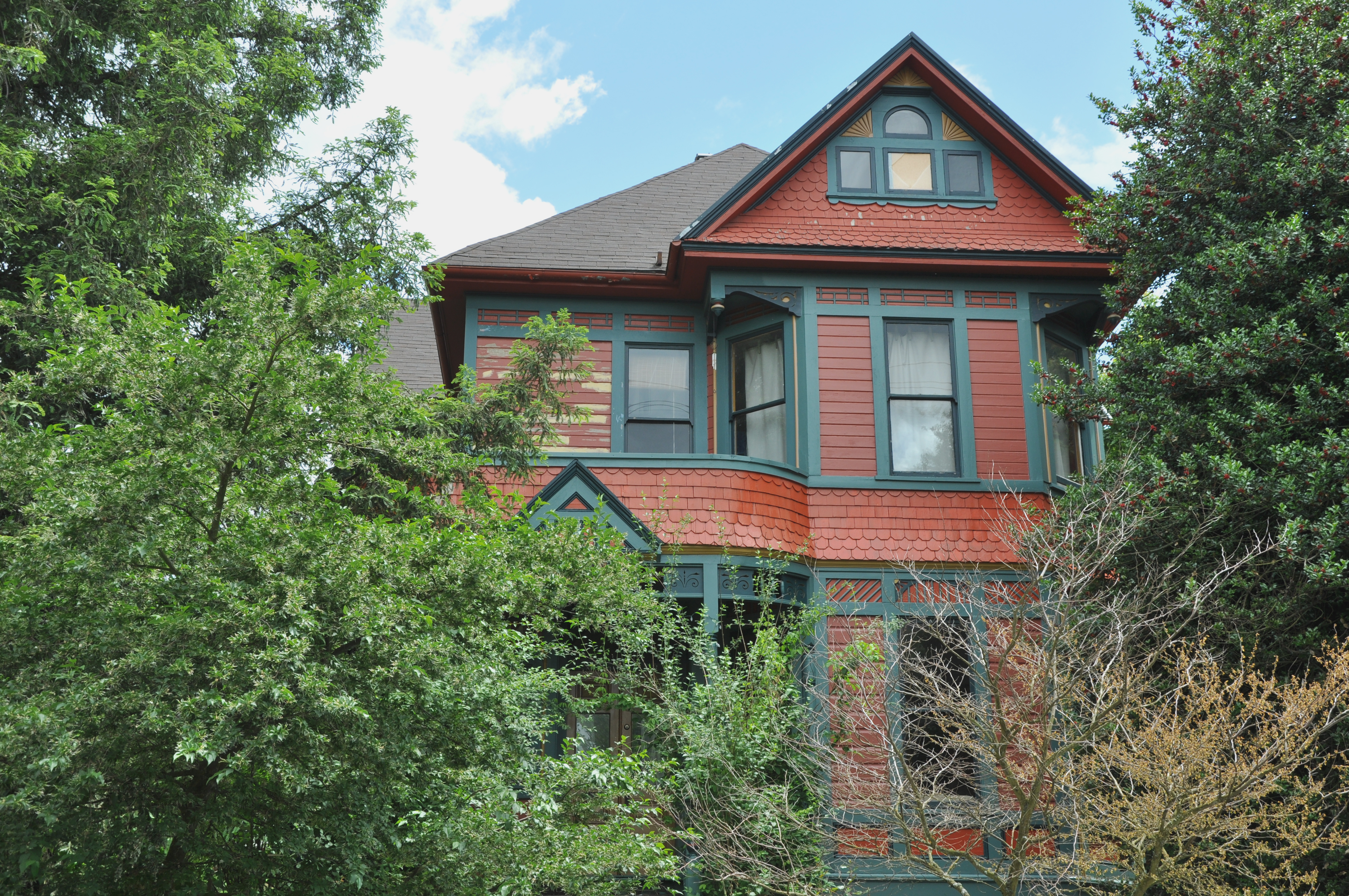
Wilhelmina Mohle House

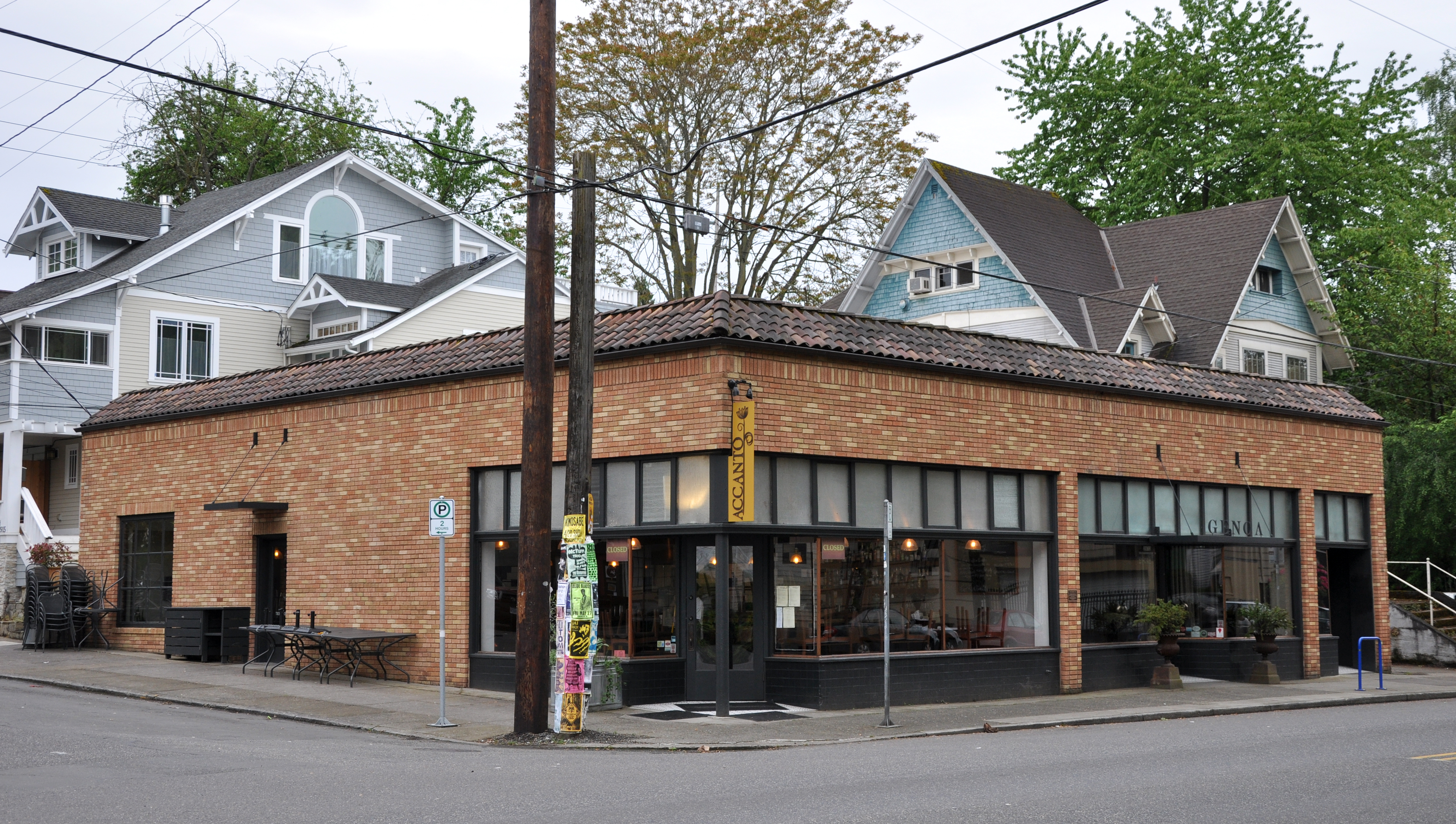
Genoa Building

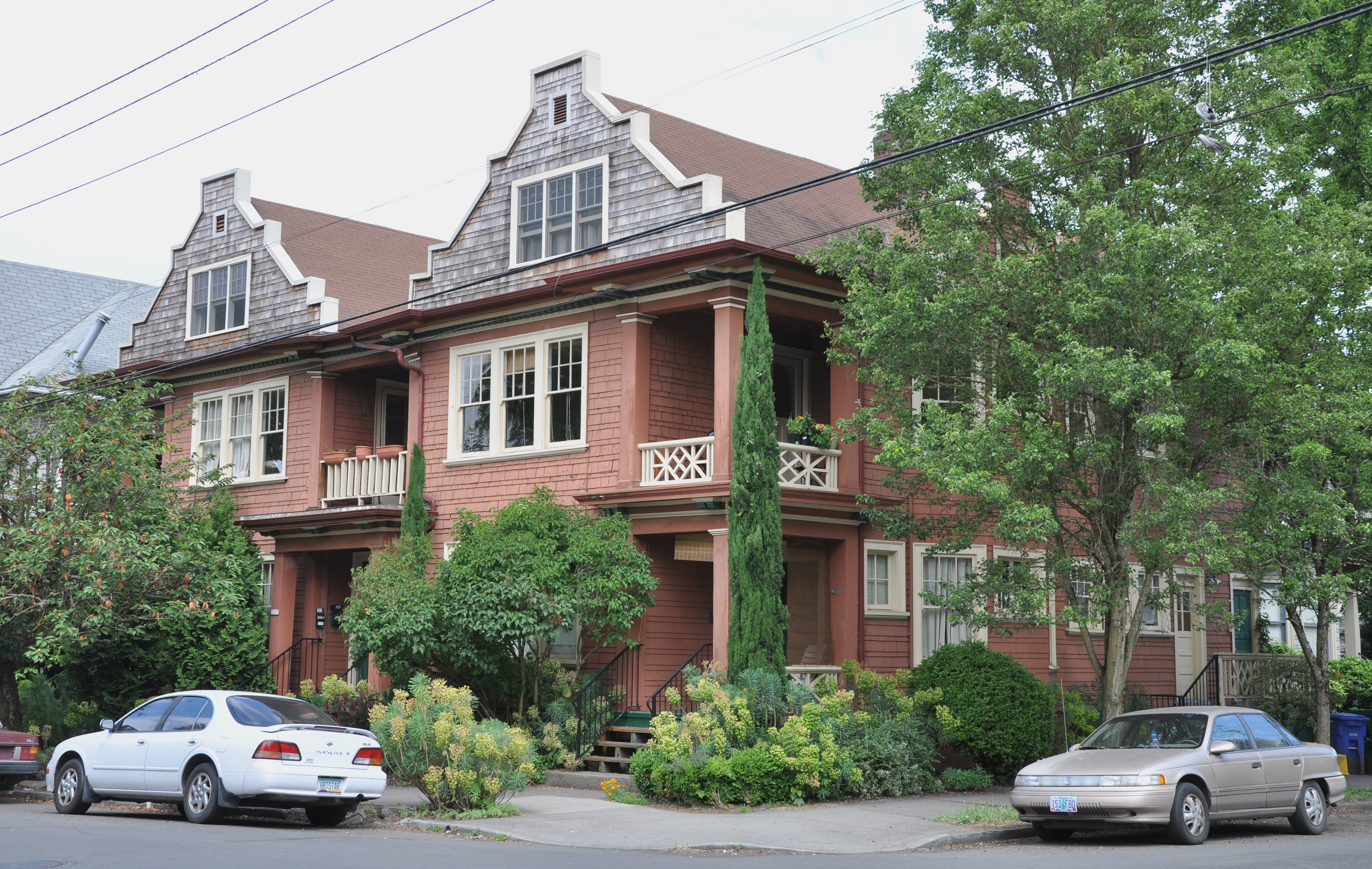
John M. Wallace Fourplex

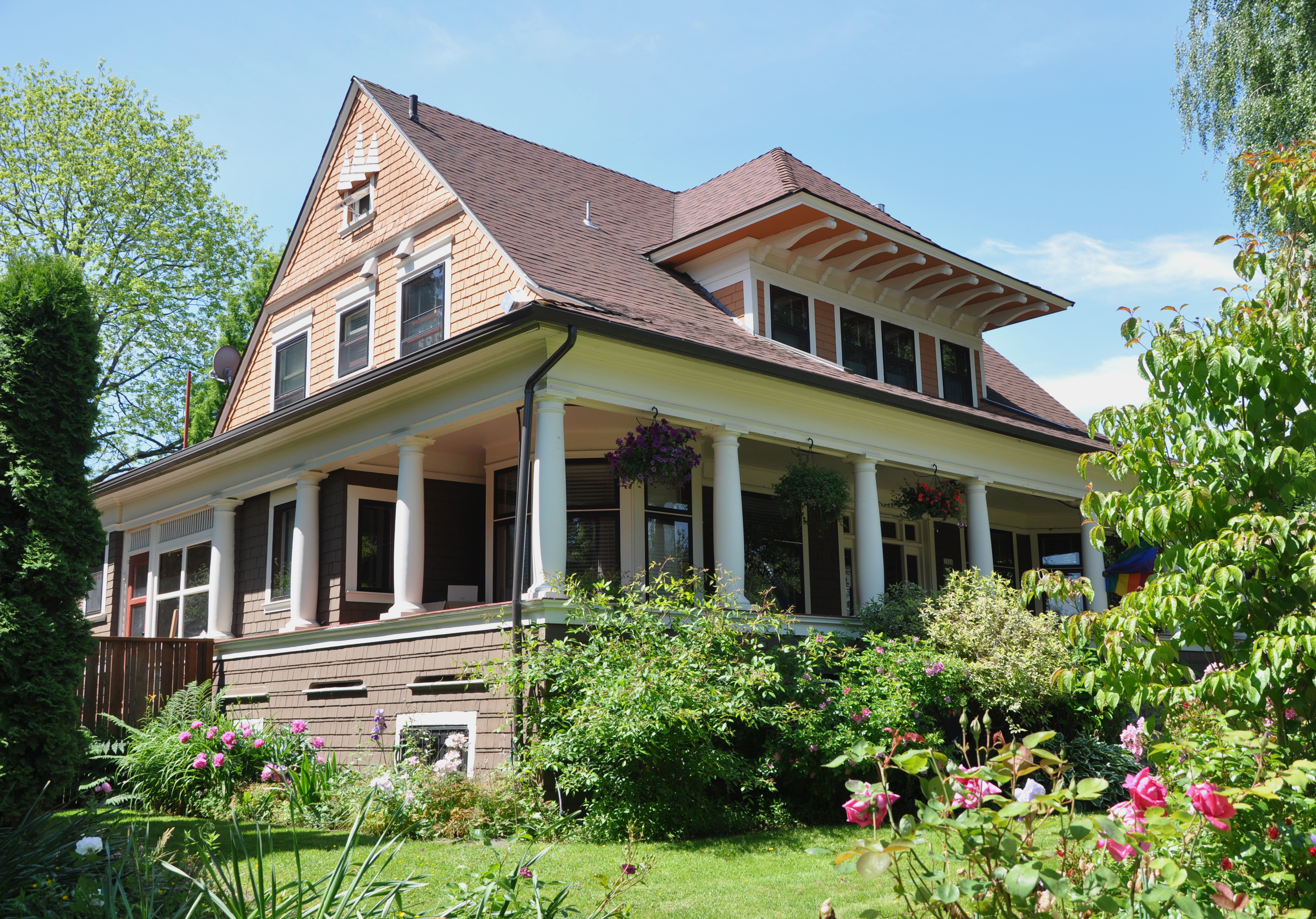
Edward D. Dupont House

== Libraries ==
- The Belmont Library is the Multnomah County Library branch in Sunnyside.
- Little free libraries are common in Sunnyside as well as much of inner Southeast Portland.

== Schools ==
- The Sunnyside Environmental School is a K-8 public school located in the heart of Sunnyside.

== See also ==
- National Register of Historic Places listings in Southeast Portland, Oregon
- Belmont, Portland, Oregon
