= Errol Heights Park =

Public park in Portland, Oregon, U.S.

- Errol Heights Natural Area
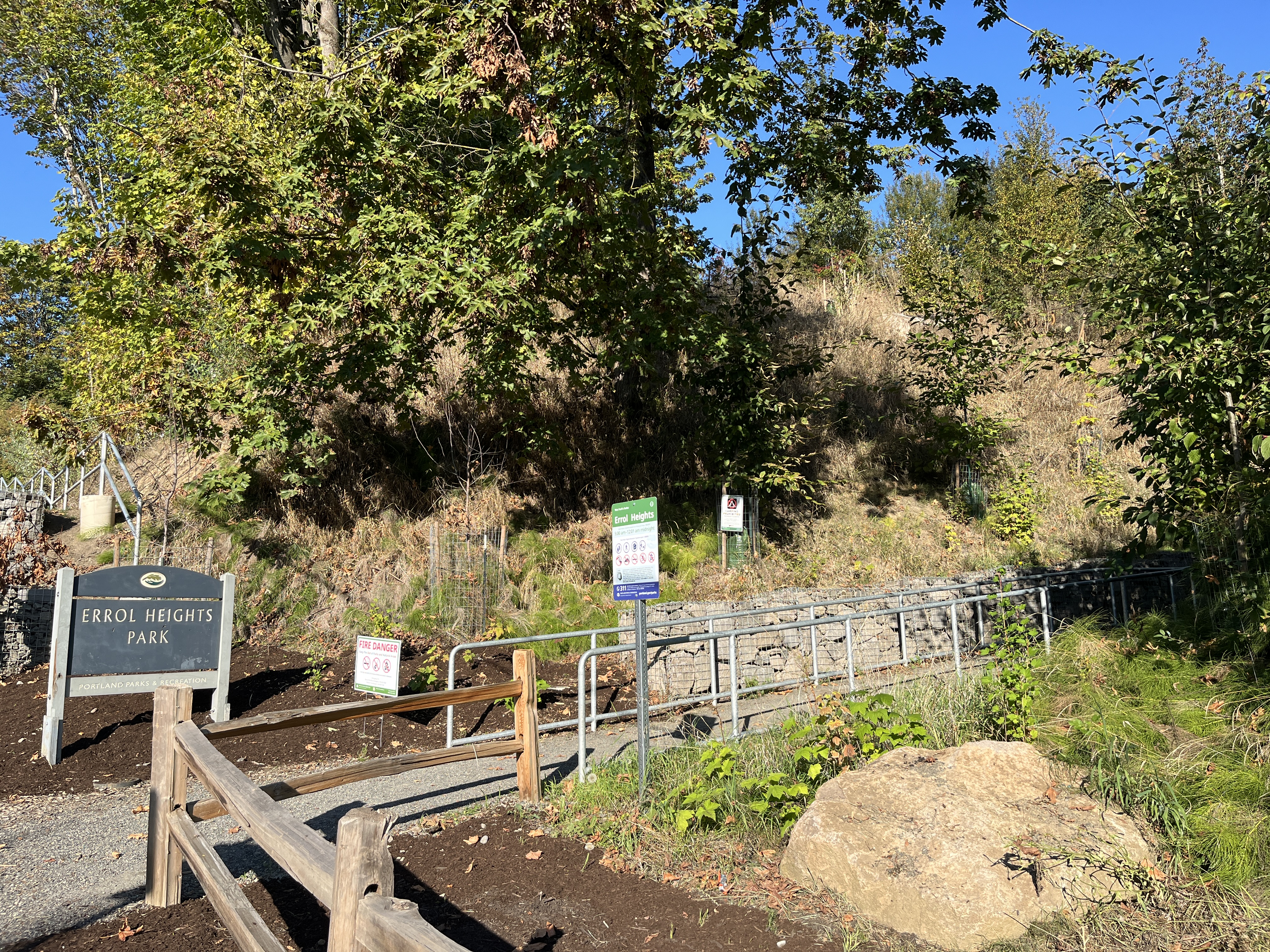
- Park entrance at Southeast 46th Avenue, 2024

- Location within Portland, Oregon
- Location: SE 52nd Avenue and Tenino Street; Portland, Oregon
- Coordinates: 45.46407°N 122.61302°W
- Area: 16.31 acres (6.60 ha)
- Operator: Portland Parks & Recreation

Errol Heights Park, also known as Errol Heights Natural Area, is a 14.25-acre (5.77 ha) public park in Portland, Oregon, United States.

== Location ==
Located in southeast Portland's Brentwood-Darlington neighborhood and bordering the Woodstock neighborhood, the 14.25-acre (5.77 ha) park includes Oregon ash wetlands and Errol Creek which feeds into nearby Johnson Creek. Milwaukie is located nearby, on the other side of Johnson Creek. Nearby parks and natural areas include Ardenwald Park, Hazeltine Park, Johnson Creek Park, Westmoreland Park, and the Tideman Johnson Natural Area. The SE Tacoma/Johnson Creek light rail station is located to the west, on the other side of Oregon Route 99E. Springwater Corridor runs along SE Johnson Creek Road at the south end of the park.

== Amenities ==
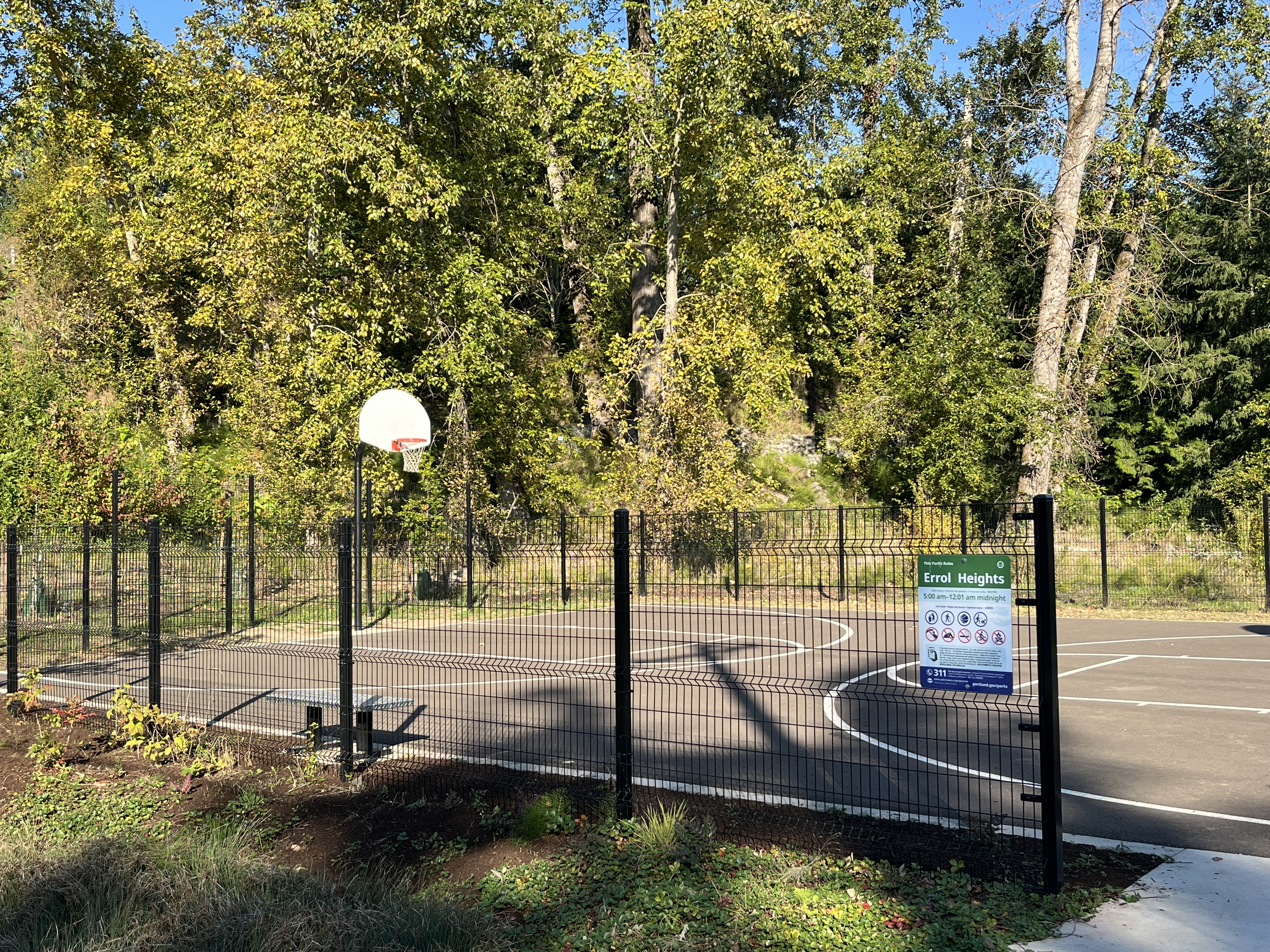
The basketball court was added during the 2018–2024 renovations.

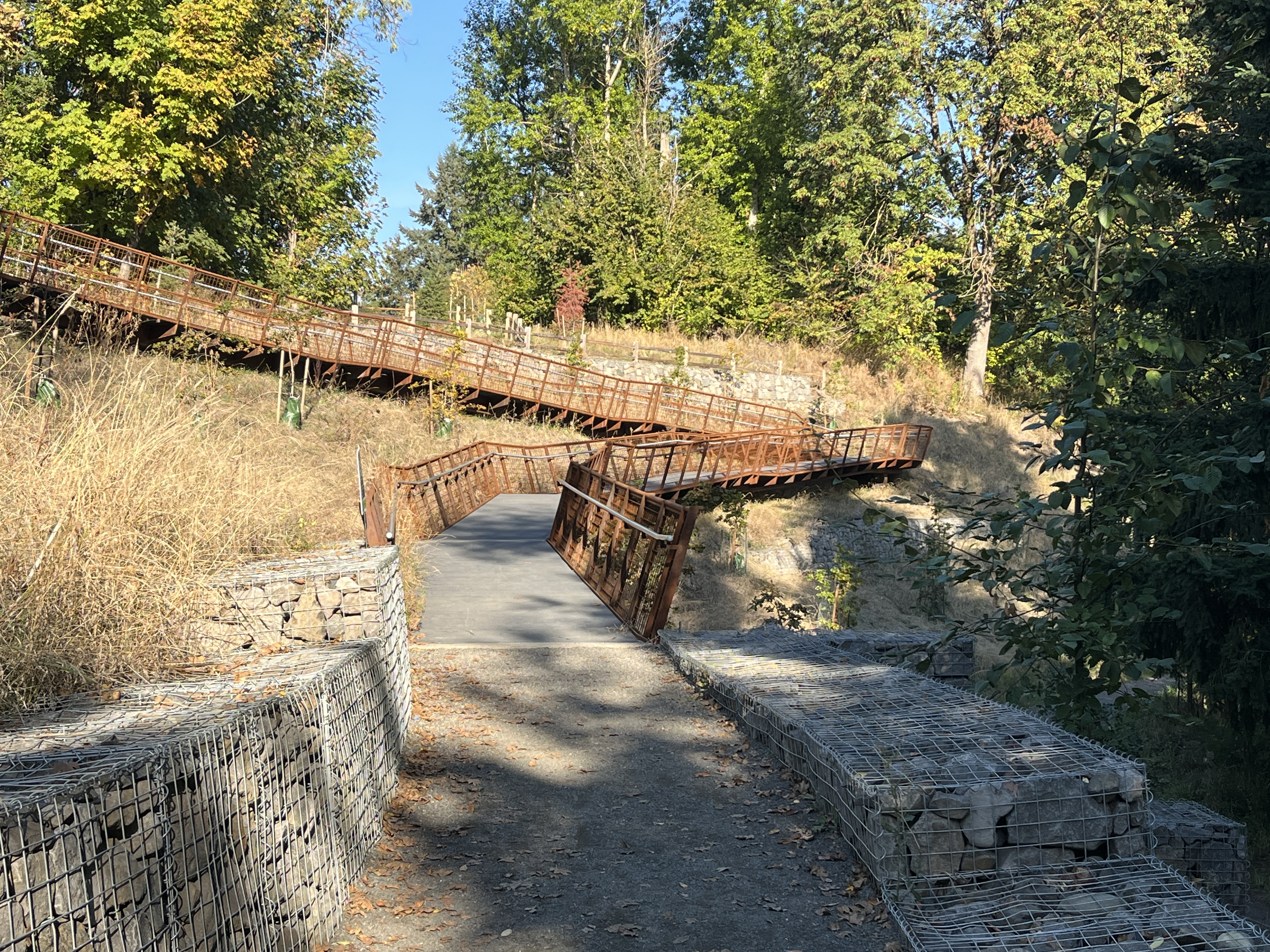
Part of the raised boardwalk (2024)

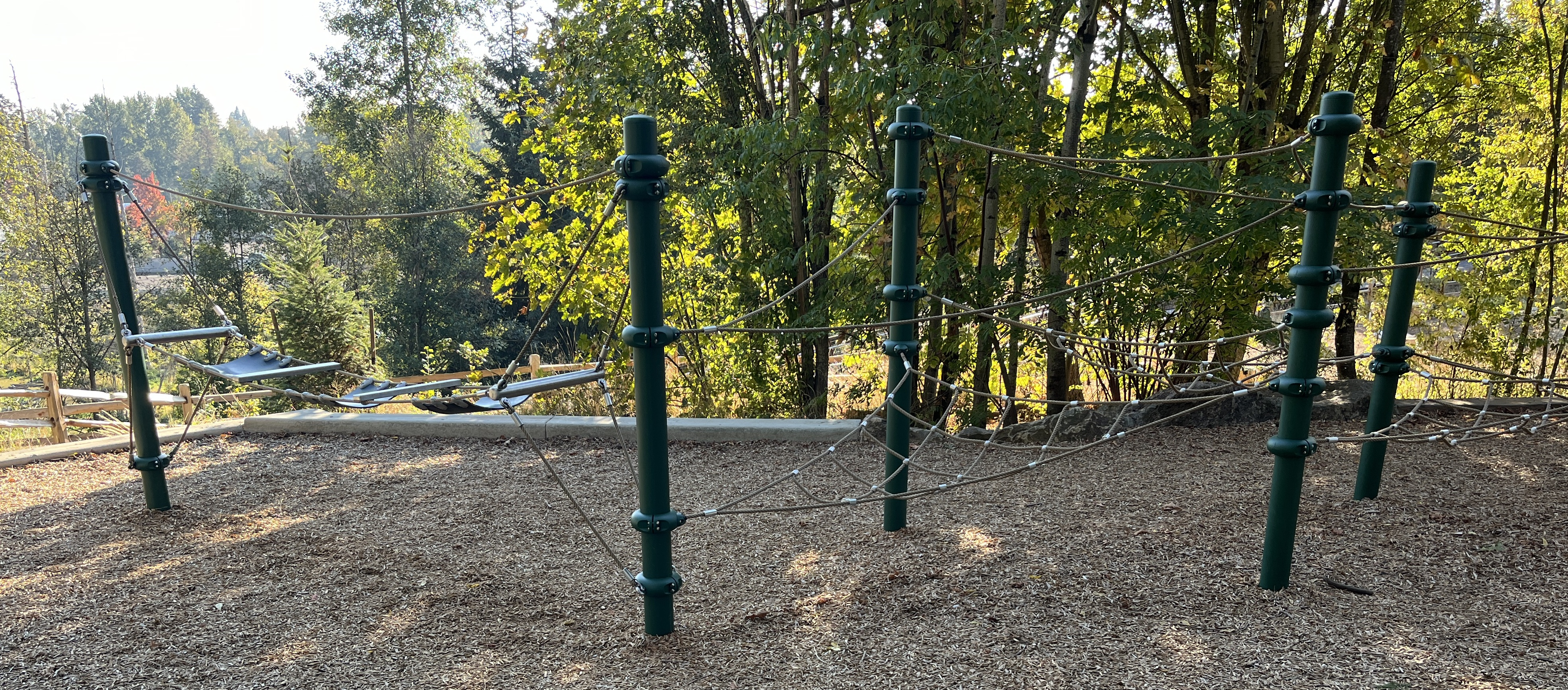
Play structure with netting

The park's features include a skatepark, basketball court, playground, public restroom, splash pad, and wetland viewpoints. Most of the trails are ADA-accessible, as is the raised boardwalk. There is also a community garden.

== History ==
Prior to European colonization of the Americas, there were multiple groups of native people who lived in the Willamette Valley and surrounding areas.

The first colonial settlers in the Brentwood-Darlington neighborhood began settling there in 1882, living in "single-family homesteads". Some of these settlers were afforded the land through the Donation Land Claim Act, an 1850 statute of the United States government that was designed to encourage European settlement of the Oregon Territory. The area remained relatively small until World War II, when many people moved to southeast Portland.

PP&R acquired the first of the land that would become Errol Heights Park in 1966.

In the 1990s, local residents formed a group called Friends of Errol Heights and began tending to the area by clearing out invasive species, planting native plants, and working with city officials to restore wetlands. Other groups that worked on the park prior to its renovation include Friends of Trees, Hands-On Portland, Johnson Creek Watershed Council, Portland Parks Foundation, SOLVE, and schools like Franklin High School, Kelly Elementary School, and Sunnyside Elementary School.

In 1999, Barbara Schnabel sold 2.32 acres (0.94 ha) of land to PP&R, expanding the area of the park. Her late husband, George Schnabel, built their house himself and the couple envisioned the area as a sanctuary for people and animals.

In 2018, Portland Parks & Recreation (PP&R) began a project to restore wildlife habitat and add amenities to the park. The project cost 12 million dollars and was officially completed in January 2024. New features of the park include a basketball court, playground, public restroom, skatepark, splash pad, wetland viewpoints, new ADA-accessible trails, and an ADA-accessible elevated boardwalk. Terresa White and Mike Suri worked together to create a sculpture for the park.

== Ecosystem and wildlife ==
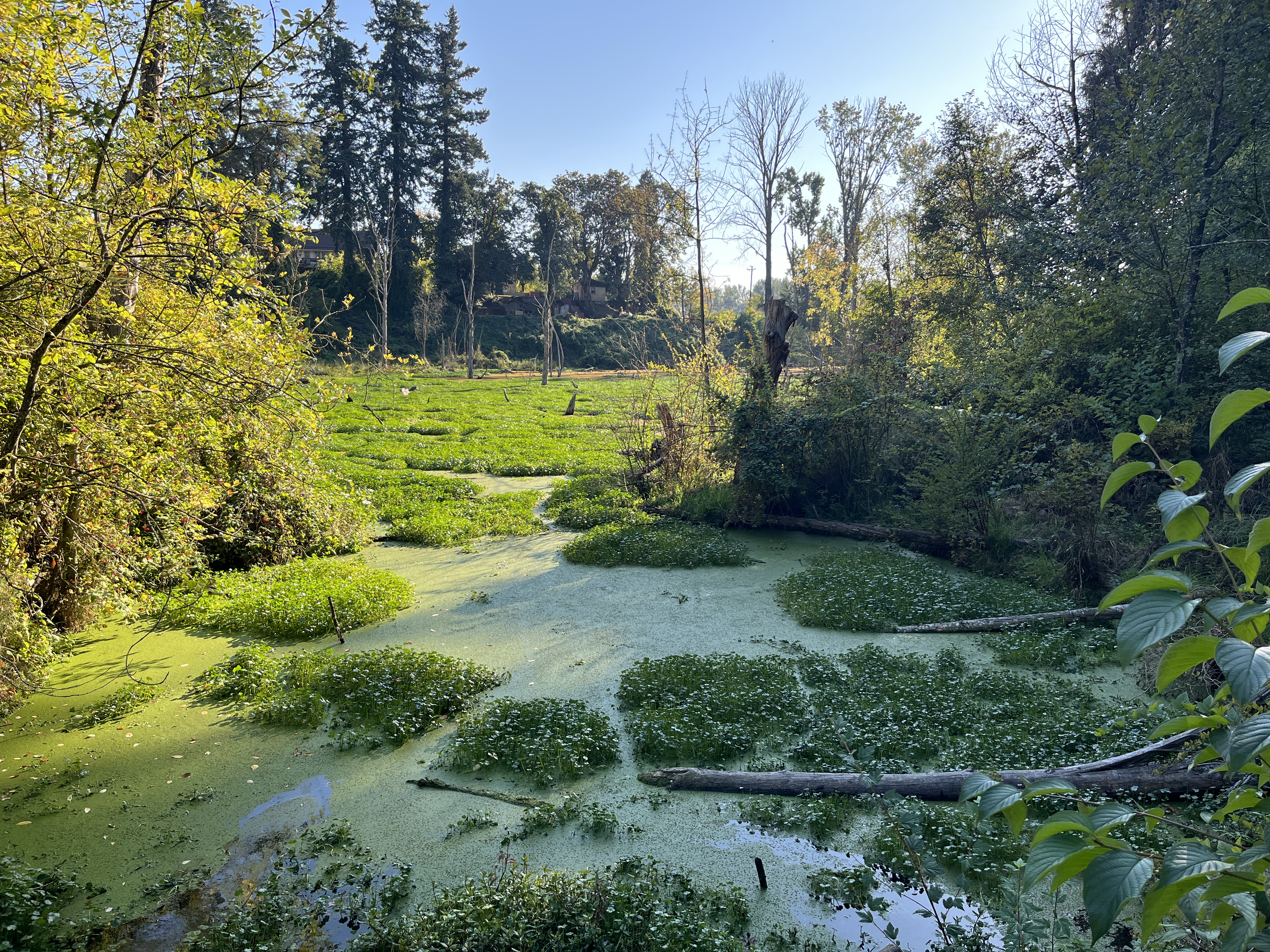
Restoration of wetland habitat was a major focus of the park upgrades (2018–2024).

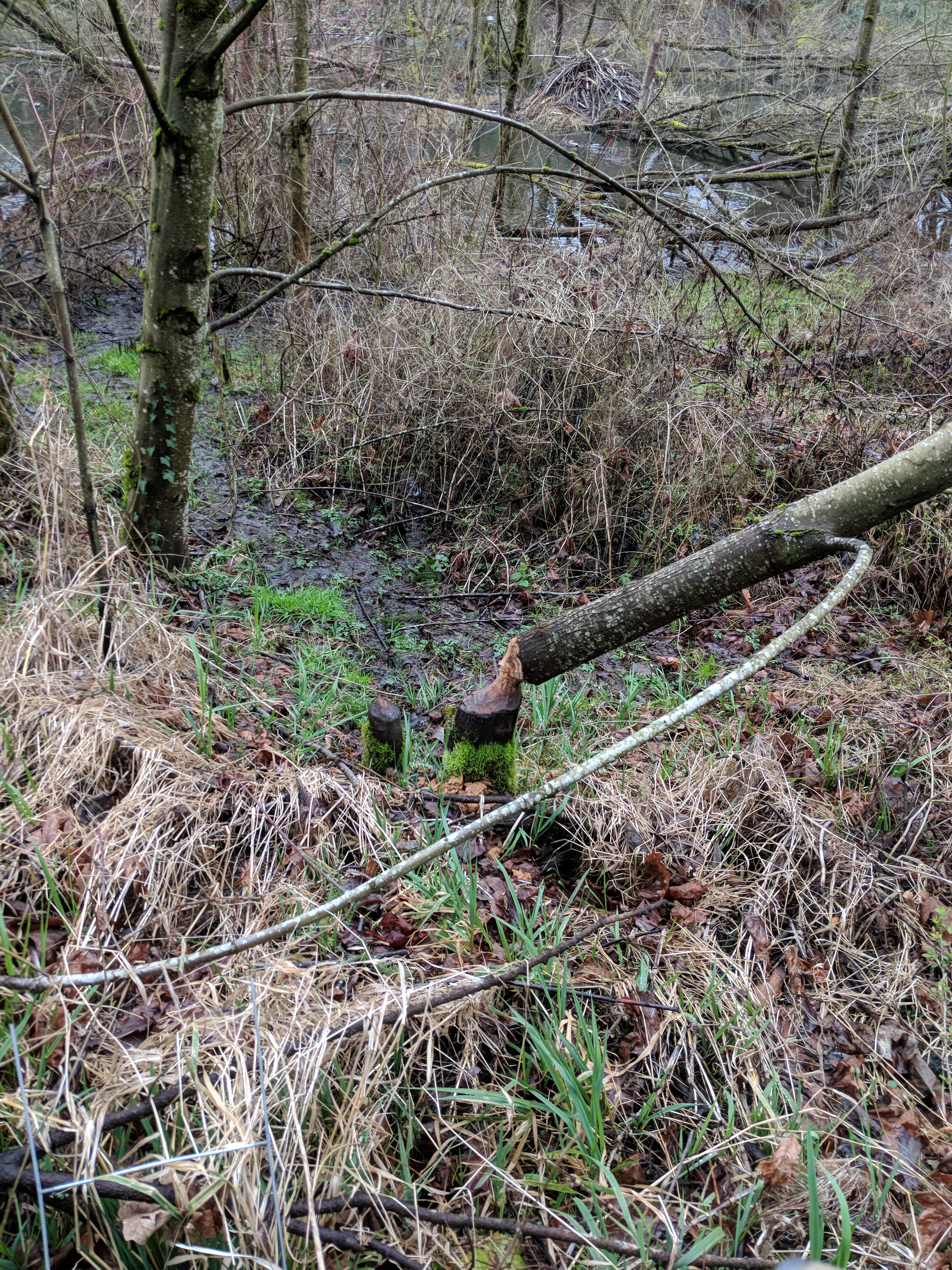
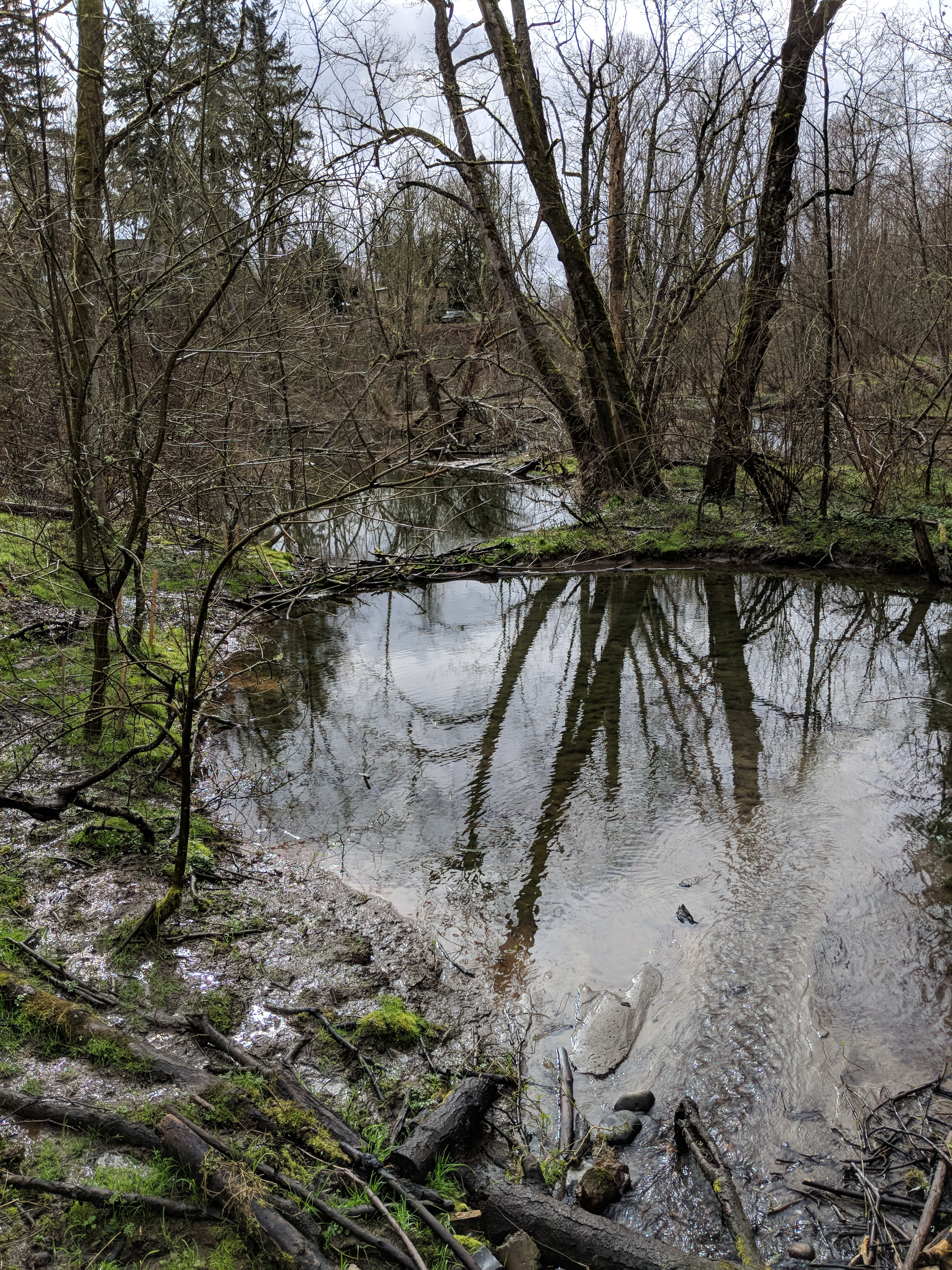
Beavers tend to avoid contact with humans, but evidence of their presence can be seen in the environment. This Errol Heights tree (left) is one example, showing hallmark "beaver chew" marks; This pond (right) was created by the park's beavers, held together by a combination of mud and sticks.

Errol Heights Park was designed to enable people to access the area, while also supporting wildlife. According to a local natural resources ecologist, “We’ve destroyed so much habitat, and [wildlife] pathways have been disrupted, [...] So once they get here, they hang out here. You could walk in the forest for hours—days!—and see half the species in that pristine wilderness that you would see in an hour in this park.”

The park and nearby neighborhoods are known for their feral peacock population, which has lived in the area since at least 2007. It is unclear how the birds first arrived, but they are not native to the area, so the Audubon Society is not allowed to work with them, despite complaints from local residents. Other birds found in the park include blue heron, owls, western tanagers, swallows, red-breasted sapsuckers, ducks, geese, and warblers.

Beavers also live in the park. The Portland Bureau of Environmental Services began removing man-made dams from the park in 2007 and have since allowed the beavers to build their own dams and lodges. This resulted in the formation of a large pond in the park. Other mammals spotted in the park include minks, muskrats, river otters, and deer. There have historically been populations of nutria and gophers, which are invasive in the area.

Pacific tree frogs live in the park, alongside salamanders like Ensatina eschscholtzii and reptiles like the northwestern garter snake.

There are many trees in the area, including bigleaf maples, Douglas firs, black cottonwood (Populus balsamifera), red alder, willow, and white oak. Other plants include watercress (Rorippa nasturtium-aquaticum), duckweed (Lemna minor), and water fern (Azolla).

== See also ==
- List of parks in Portland, Oregon
- National Register of Historic Places listings in Southeast Portland, Oregon
- Other nearby locations:
  - Davis Graveyard
  - Eastmoreland Golf Course
  - Jacques and Amelia Reinhart House
  - Kerf (sculpture)
  - Oregon Sports Hall of Fame
