= Arleta Library Bakery & Cafe =

Defunct restaurant in Portland, Oregon, U.S.

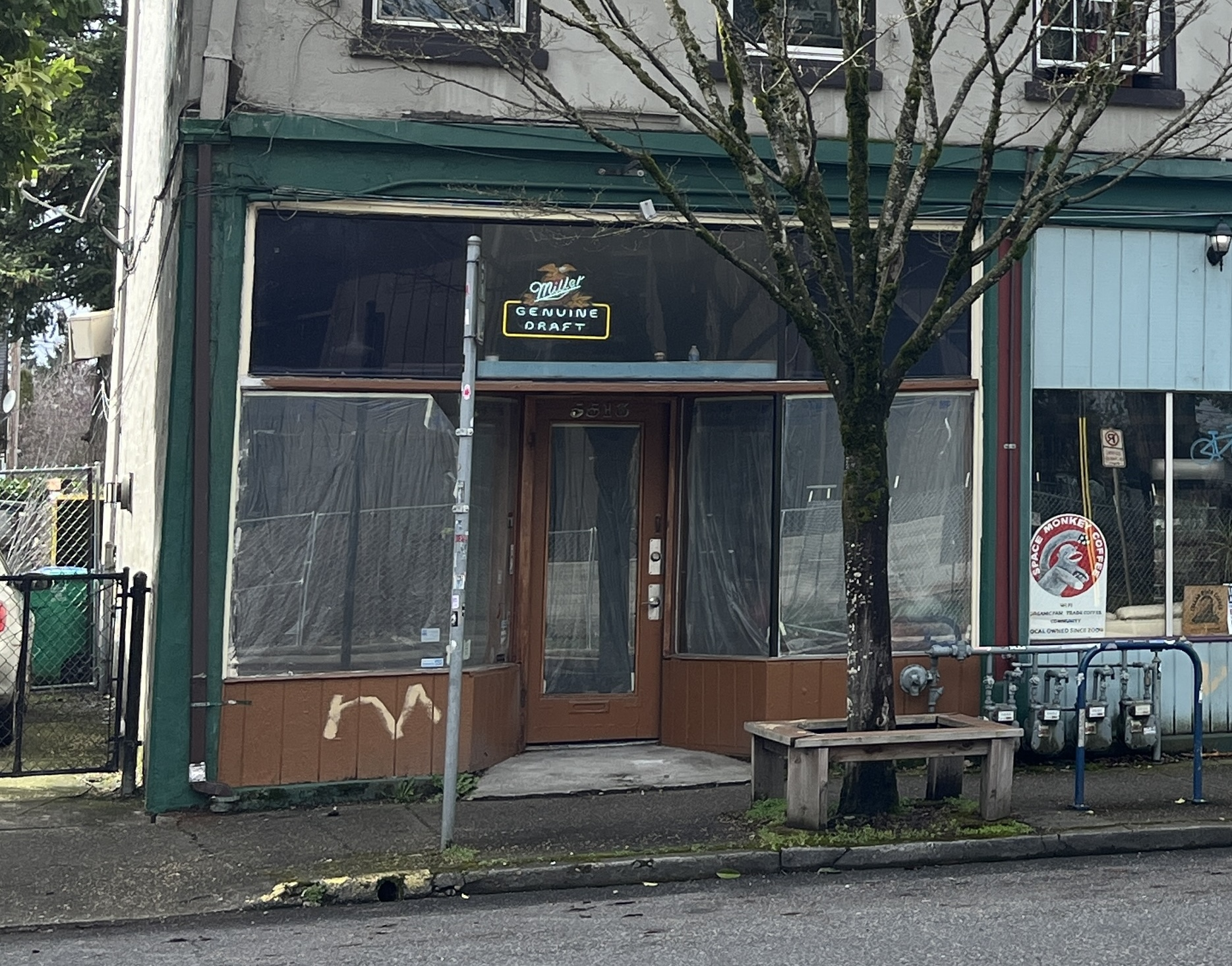
- 2025 photograph of the exterior of the building that housed Arleta Library Bakery & Cafe
- Interactive map of Arleta Library Bakery & Cafe

Restaurant information
- Established: 2005
- Closed: March 2020
- Owner: Nick Iannarone
- Previous owner: Sarah Iannarone
- Location: 5513 Southeast 72nd Avenue, Portland, Multnomah, Oregon, 97206, United States
- Coordinates: 45.4828°N 122.5895°W
- Website: arletalibrary.com

Arleta Library Bakery & Cafe was a restaurant in the Mt. Scott-Arleta neighborhood of southeast Portland, Oregon, United States. Sarah and Nick Iannarone established Arleta in 2005, and it closed in 2020 because of financial difficulties caused by the COVID-19 pandemic. Arleta garnered a positive reception, especially as a brunch destination, and Guy Fieri visited the restaurant for an episode of the Food Network series Diners, Drive-Ins and Dives.

== Description ==
Arleta Library Bakery & Cafe operated at the intersection of 72nd Avenue and Harold Street in the Mt. Scott-Arleta neighborhood of southeast Portland. It had a narrow interior. The restaurant's slogan was "because good food is long overdue". According to Willamette Week, the family-owned business used local ingredients including Painted Hills beef as well as Pearl Bakery brioche in the pan dolce with whipped honey butter, maple syrup, and seasonal fruit.

The menu also included breakfast sandwiches, omelettes, pancakes, coconut macaroons, chocolate chip cookies, and coffee. The Portland's Best Biscuits-n-Gravy had two biscuits with sausage gravy and pork loin, and the Hawthorne scrambles had eggs and Tillamook cheddar. The Bullseye was a bun with scrambled eggs, cheddar and bacon. The restaurant also served sandwiches and a Caesar salad with croutons and salmon or roasted turkey. Among sandwiches were the Bat out of Hell and the Paul Rubens. The roasted turkey sandwich had avocado, bacon, and a honey mustard spread, and the cured ham sandwich came with sauerkraut and Thousand Island dressing.

== History ==
Arleta Library Bakery & Cafe opened in 2005. The business was co-owned by Sarah and Nick Iannarone until December 2018, and the couple divorced in 2019. Guy Fieri visited the restaurant for an episode of the Food Network series Diners, Drive-Ins and Dives.

After operating for approximately fifteen years, Arleta closed in March 2020 during the COVID-19 pandemic. The cafe's owners said the space was too small to operate with social distancing. In May 2020, Rosie Siefert of The Daily Meal wrote that the cafe closed because of the "financial strain" of the COVID-19 pandemic. As a result, the staff opened a GoFundMe for customers to give "one last tip". The queer-owned counter service restauarant Shami Café began operating in the space in May 2025.

== Reception ==
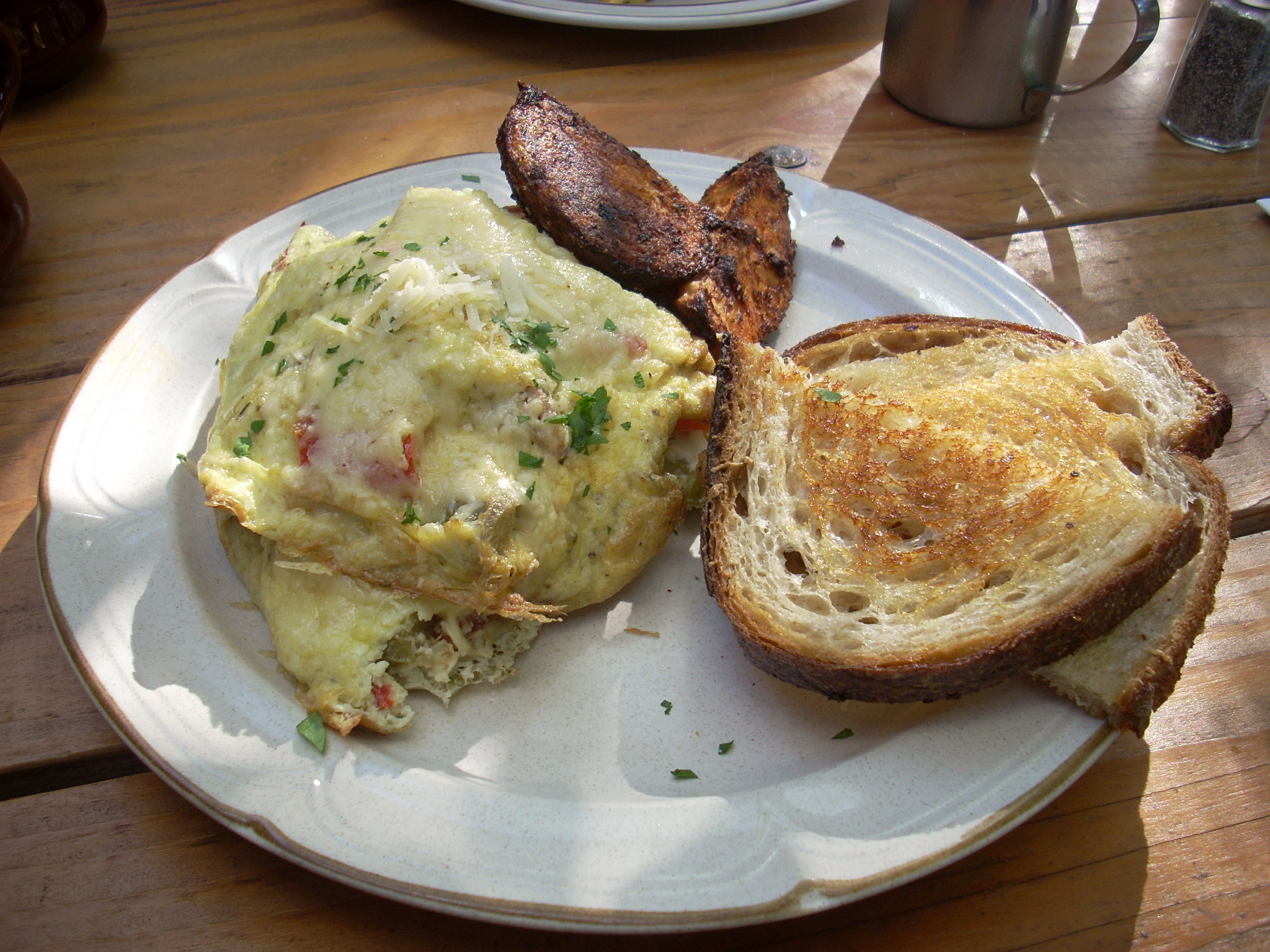
The Tuscan

According to the Food Network, Fieri "appreciated the complexity" of the Sicilian hash with braciola and called the sweet potato biscuits with pork and rosemary sausage "dynamite". Andy Kryza included Arleta Library Bakery & Cafe in Thrillist's 2013 overview of places to take a mother for Mother's Day. Arleta was a runner-up in the Best Brunch category of Willamette Week's annual Best of Portland readers' poll in 2010. Jay Horton recommended Arleta in the newspaper's 2016 overview of the Mt. Scott-Arleta and Woodstock neighborhoods, and wrote:

While never much of a library, the Arleta Cafe earned a certain measure of cultural permanence when Diners, Drive-Ins and Dives's Guy Fieri stopped by to marvel at its trademark sweet potato biscuits with rosemary-sausage gravy. Following the Food Network imprimatur and owner Sarah Iannarone's ill-starred mayoral candidacy, a steady string of curious interlopers have joined die-hard regulars amid the morning crush.

In 2014 and 2016, the restaurant was a finalist in The Oregonian's People's Choice competition for Portland's best brunch. Michael Russell included the business in the newspaper's 2019 list of Portland's forty best brunches. Following Arleta's closure, Karen Brooks of Portland Monthly called the restaurant a "beloved neighborhood anchor".

== See also ==
- Impact of the COVID-19 pandemic on the restaurant industry in the United States
- List of Diners, Drive-Ins and Dives episodes
