= George P. Lent Investment Properties =

Historic buildings in Portland, Oregon, U.S.

- U.S. National Register of Historic Places
- Portland Historic Landmark
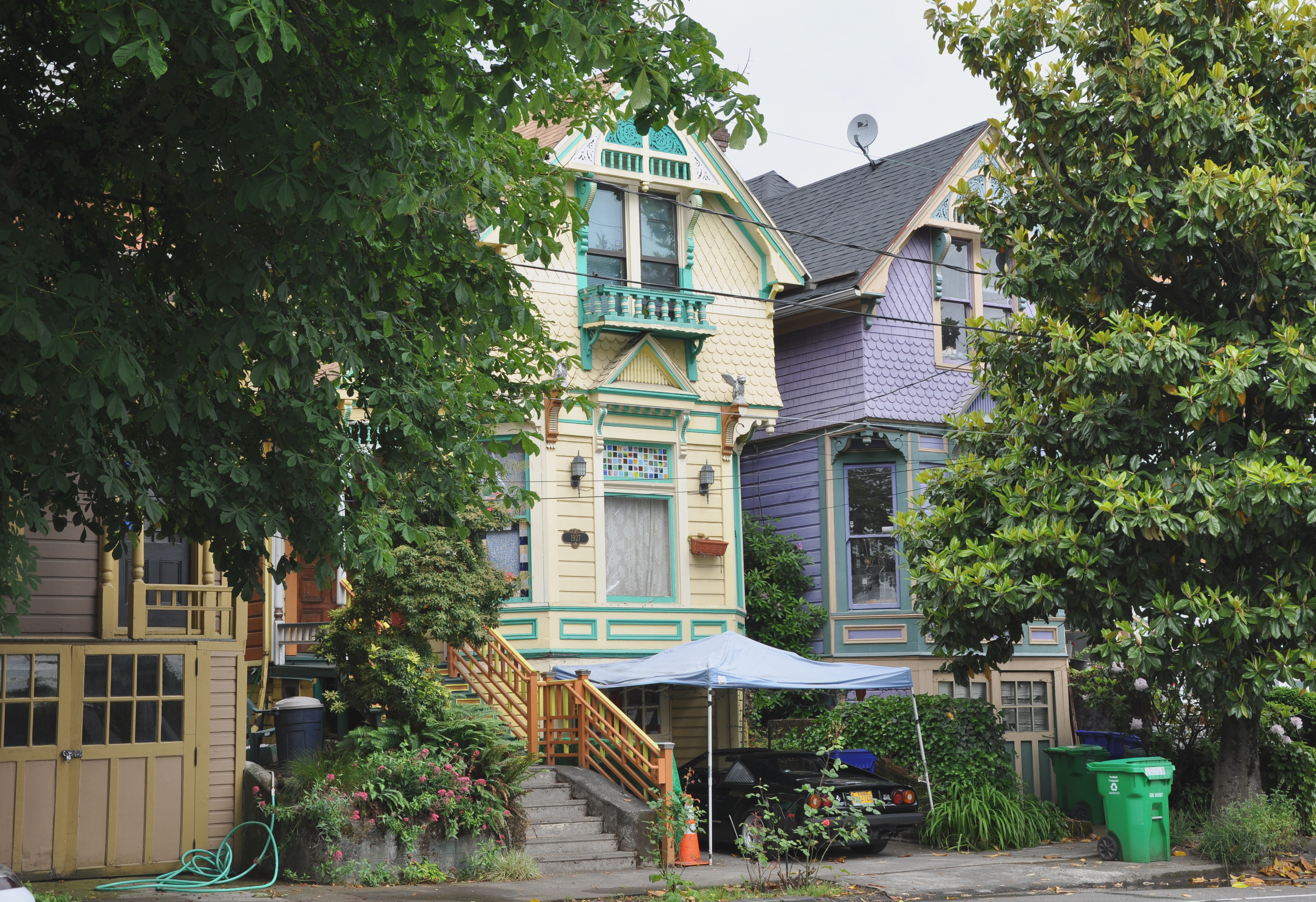
- Two of the homes as seen from Southeast 7th Avenue in 2011
- Location: 1921–1927 SE 7th Avenue and 621–637 SE Harrison Street; Portland, Oregon
- Coordinates: 45°30′32″N 122°39′33″W
- Area: about 20 by 40 feet (6.1 by 12.2 m)
- Built: 1893
- Architectural style: Queen Anne
- MPS: Portland Eastside
- NRHP reference No.: 89000082
- Added to NRHP: March 8, 1989

The George P. Lent Investment Properties, also known as Firehouse Row, in southeast Portland in the U.S. state of Oregon, consists of a group of five similar 1.5-story, single-family houses listed on the National Register of Historic Places. Built in 1893, the group was added to the register in 1989. The Queen Anne style houses are next to one another at the corner of Southeast 7th Avenue and Southeast Harrison Streets. They are commonly referred to as Firehouse Row because firemen from the adjacent Portland Fire Station No. 23 sometimes lived in them.

Constructed during the period of rapid growth that followed East Portland's annexation by Portland in 1891, the buildings are among the few Victorian-era homes remaining in the city's Hosford–Abernethy neighborhood. Each is about 20 feet (6.1 m) wide and 40 feet (12 m) long. George P. Lent, for whom the city's Lents neighborhood is named, was the original owner of the rental properties. He sold them two years later, and they subsequently changed hands many times. Among the early tenants of the house at 1921 Southeast 7th Avenue was Lee G. Holden, who designed firehouses, including the one next door.

== See also ==
- National Register of Historic Places listings in Southeast Portland, Oregon
