= Lents, Portland, Oregon =

Lents
- Neighborhood
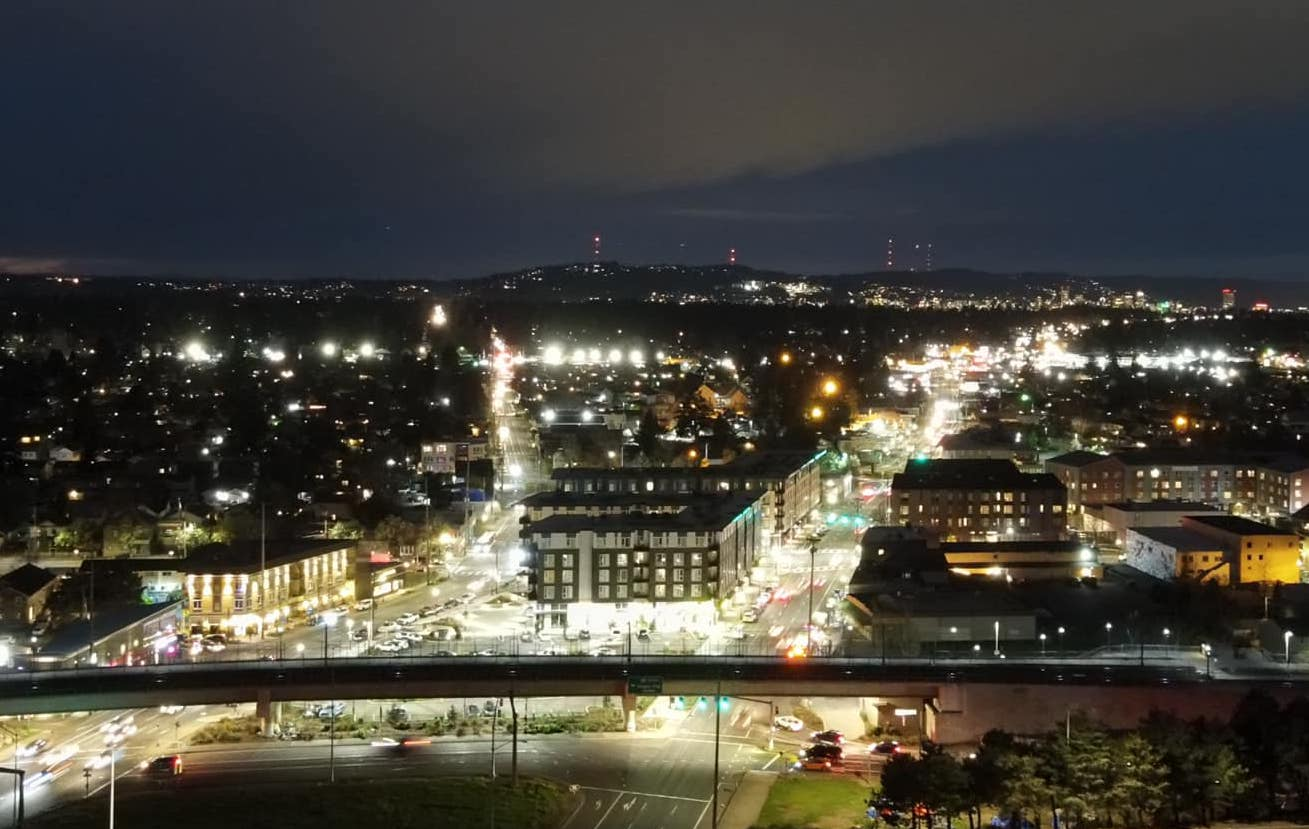
- Lents Town Center at night, April 2021
- Interactive map of Lents
- Coordinates: 45°28′31″N 122°33′43″W
- Country: United States
- State: Oregon
- City: Portland

Government
  - Association: Lents Neighborhood Association
  - Coalition: East Portland Neighborhood Office

Area
  - Total: 3.03 sq mi (7.86 km^{2})

Population (2020)
  - Total: 22,236
  - Density: 7,330/sq mi (2,830/km^{2})

Housing
  - No. of households: 7169
  - Occupancy rate: 93% occupied
  - Owner-occupied: 3192 households (55%)
  - Renting: 2564 households (45%)
  - Avg. household size: 2.81 persons

The Lents neighborhood in the Southeast section of Portland, Oregon is bordered by SE Powell Blvd. on the north, the Clackamas County line or City of Portland line on the south (whichever is farther south), SE 82nd Ave. to the west, and roughly SE 112th on the east. The NE corner overlaps with the Powellhurst-Gilbert neighborhood. In addition to Powellhurst-Gilbert on the north and east, Lents also borders Foster-Powell, Mt. Scott-Arleta, and Brentwood-Darlington on the west and Pleasant Valley on the east.

The neighborhood is one of the larger in the city at 3.75 square miles (9.7 km^{2}) and one of its oldest. Since the late 20th century, it has become more diverse, the home of many Asian, Russian/Eastern European, and Latino immigrants.

Lents is six miles (10 km) southeast of downtown Portland and lies within the 97266 ZIP code.

== History ==
Lents was originally platted as the Town of Lent by Oliver P. Lent (1830–1899) in 1892. The original town was bounded by SE Foster Rd., SE Duke St., SE 92nd Ave, and SE 97th Ave. Lent came to Oregon from Ohio.

Lent's town was originally built as a self-sufficient town and suburb of Portland. In 1912, when Lents had a population nearing 10,000, the city of Portland annexed the suburb. Because of its distance from central Portland and lower income residents, the neighborhood suffered delays in getting street and sewer improvements. Interstate 205 was originally planned to follow 39th Avenue, but the powerful and wealthier residents of Portland's Laurelhurst neighborhood successfully lobbied to have the path changed to 52nd Avenue. By the time it came to final planning in the 1970s, the city had grown and decided to move the freeway's path further out to 96th Avenue, effectively cutting the Lents neighborhood in half. By contrast, Maywood Park incorporated as an independent city and sued to stop construction of the freeway; it reached a compromise with the city over the route.

== Demographics ==
As of the 2010 Census, Lents had a population of 20,156. Its residents identified as 60.1 percent white, 14.1 percent Asian, 4.5 percent black, and 1.0 percent Native American, with 3.7 percent of census respondents identifying as two or more races. 15.8 percent of census respondents identified as Hispanic or Latino.

== Transportation ==
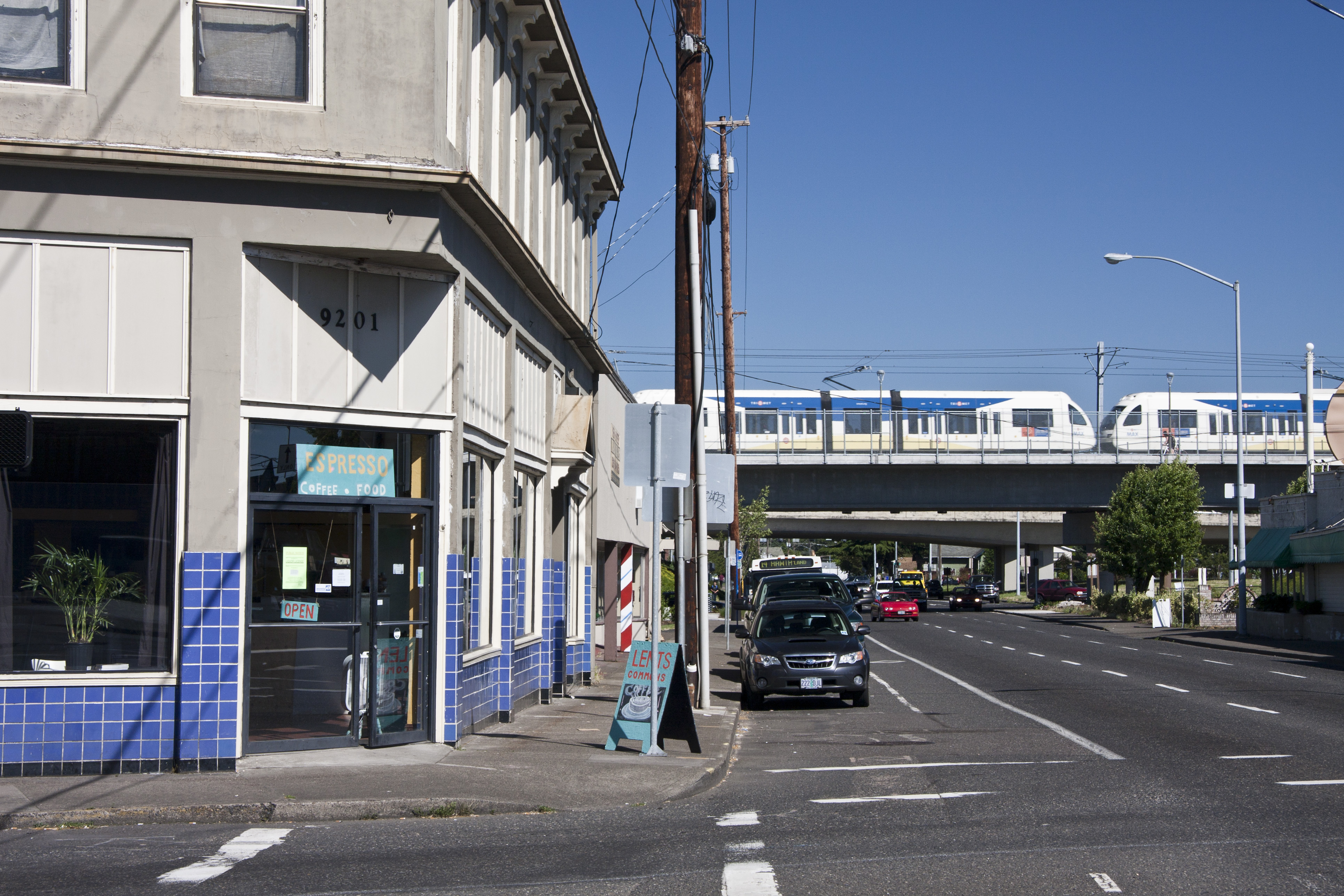
MAX Green Line going through the Lents Town Center

Lents is a transportation hub for the Portland region. Interstate 205 and three of Portland's important arterials—Powell Boulevard, Foster Road and 82nd Avenue—pass through the neighborhood, as well as the MAX Green Line and the Springwater Corridor pedestrian and bike trail.

I-205 freeway cuts through the center of the original town, where SE 92nd Avenue, which was only a half mile east of 82nd avenue, the original road to Oregon City, met SE Foster Road, which led to Foster's Farm. Beginning in 1892, a streetcar ran from downtown Portland. The route traveled from downtown across the Hawthorne Bridge to SE 50th Avenue. At SE 50th, an extant curve in the road shows the route going south. SE 50th Avenue runs into SE Foster Road. The trolley continued on SE Foster to SE 72nd Avenue, bearing south. Another extant curve to the left at Gray's Corner sent the trolley east on SE Woodstock Boulevard. This road was followed through to the curve at 97th which sent it into the neighborhood south of SE Foster Road. After several more blocks, the line ended at SE 100th Avenue where it met the interurban line that once occupied what is now called the Springwater Corridor. The interurban line continued to points east, ending in Estacada.

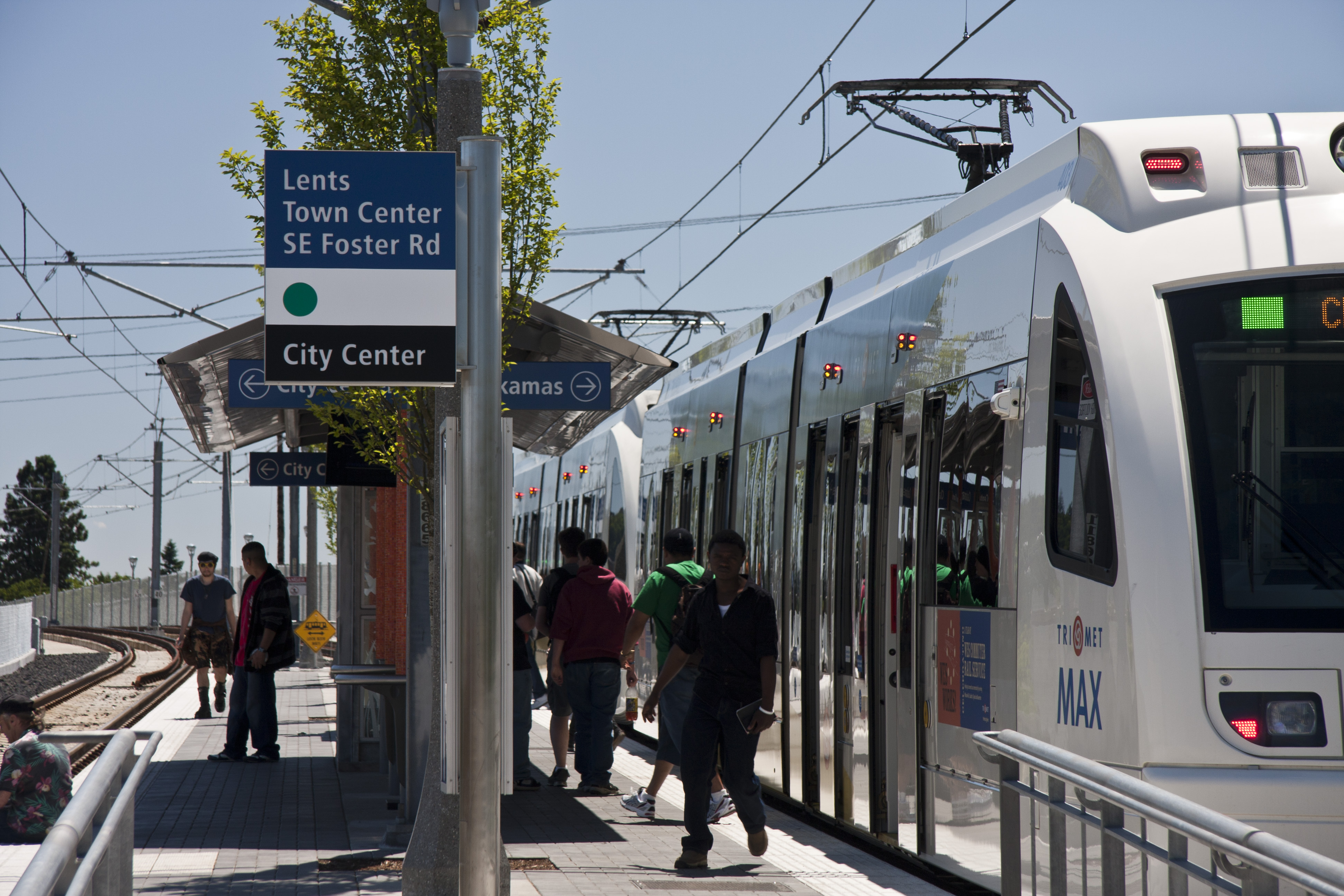
Lents Town Center MAX Station along the Green Line

Lents is served by the following TriMet bus lines:

- 4-Fessenden/Woodstock
- 9-Powell Blvd
- 10-Steele
- 14-Hawthone/Foster
- 17-Holgate/NE 33rd
- 72-Killingsworth/82nd Avenue
- 73-122nd Avenue
- 86-148th Avenue

== Future ==
In recent years, Portland has seen the potential value of the Lents neighborhood and established it as an Urban Renewal Area, which allows the city to bond on future increases in property tax revenues to fund capital projects throughout the Lents Town Center Urban Renewal Area. Many new homes and businesses have been established and more are planned. The MAX light rail system has been expanded southward from the Gateway hub, along I-205 to the Clackamas Town Center.

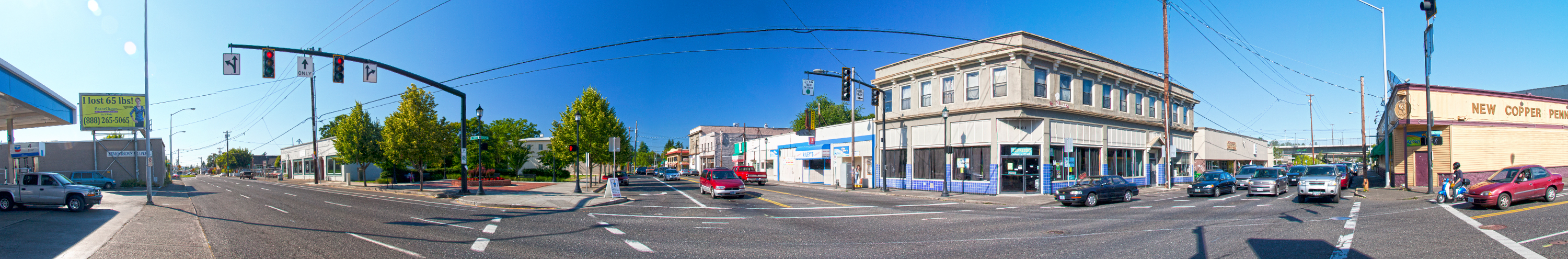
Panorama of Lents in 2010. In the late 2010s, hundreds of affordable and market-rate apartments opened in the area.

== Urban Renewal Area ==
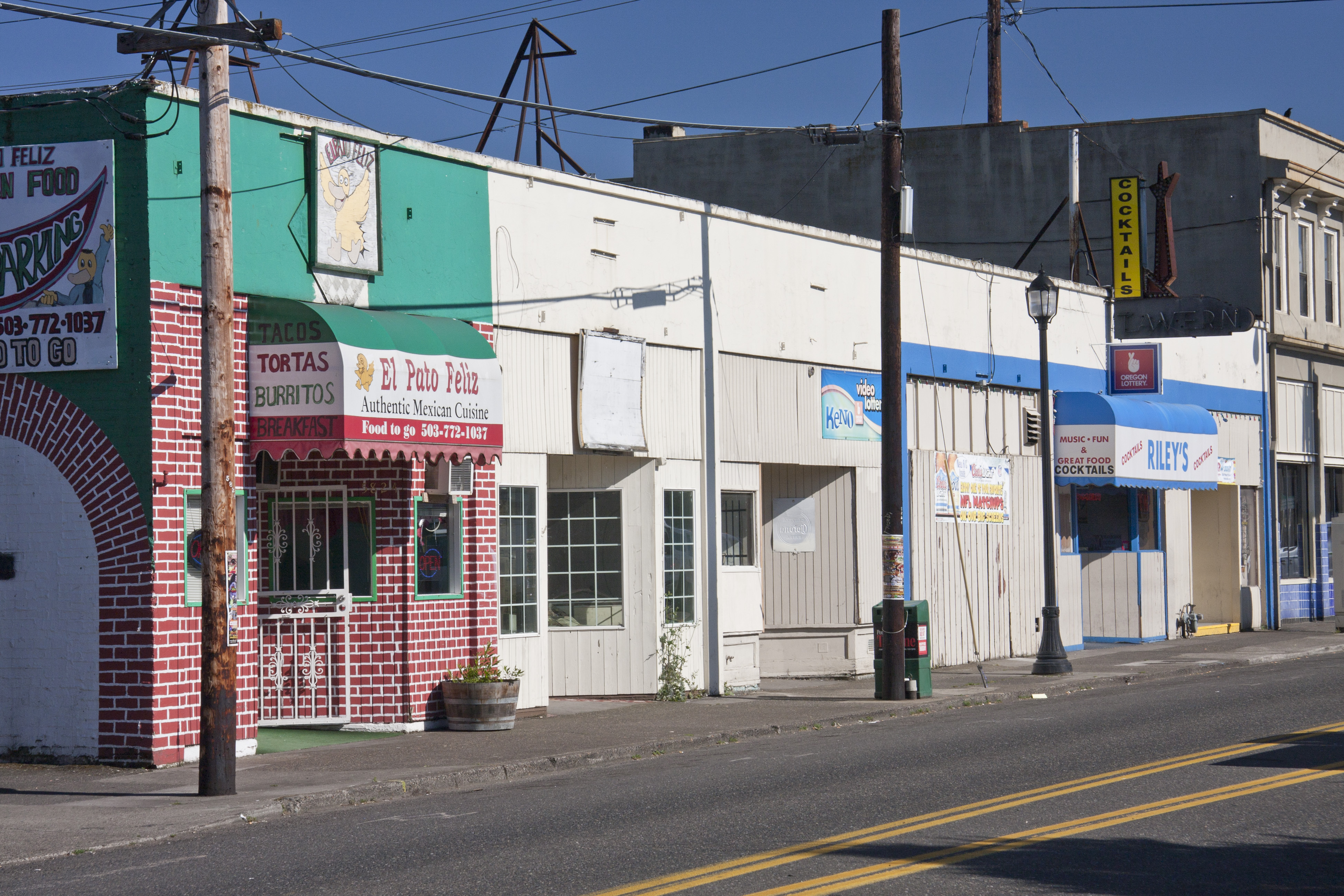
Storefronts on 92nd Avenue before renovations through public subsidy

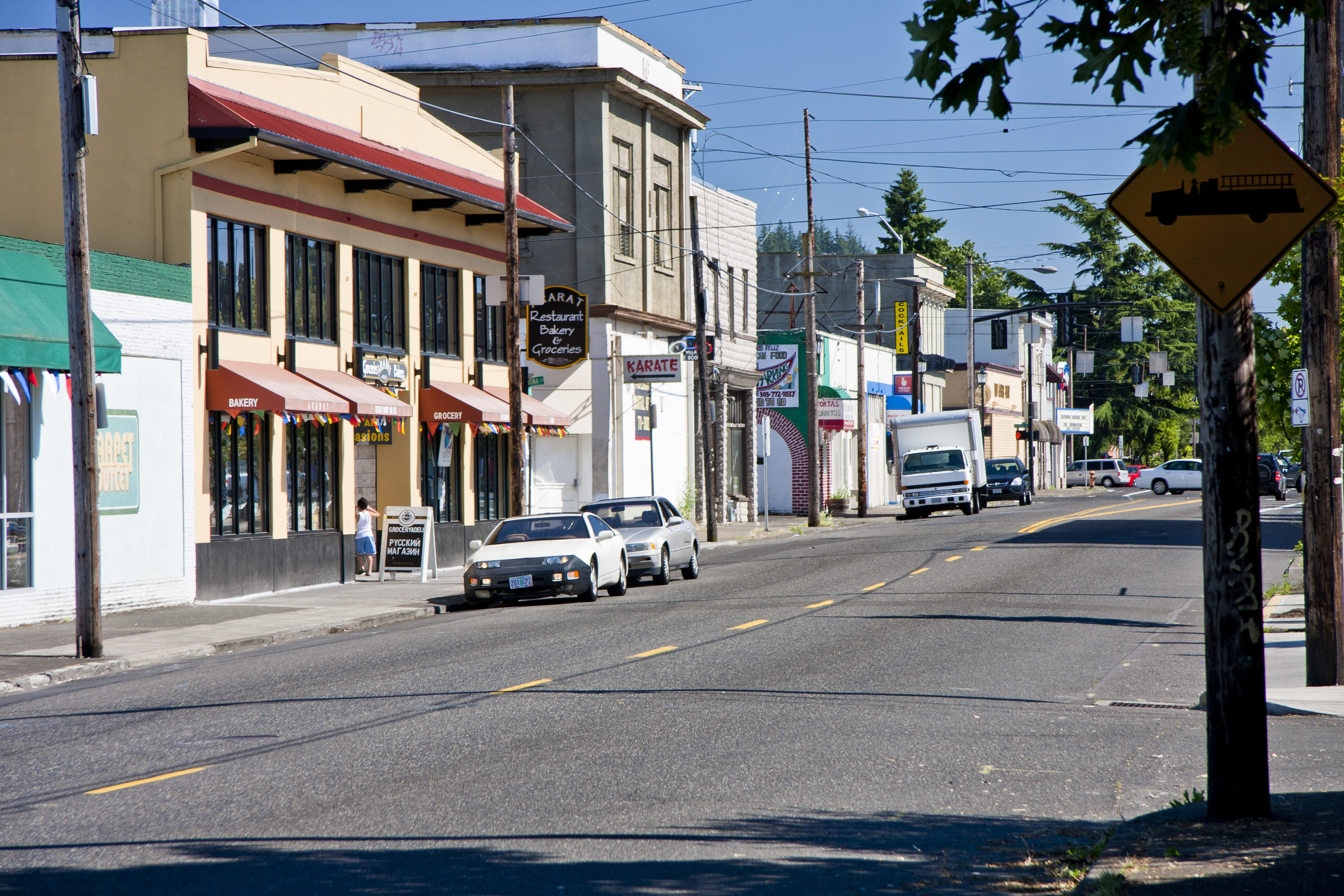
The Lents Town Center on 92nd Avenue towards Foster Road in 2010

With the completion of the Outer Southeast Community Plan, the Lents Neighborhood Plan, and the Lents Revitalization Plan, community stakeholders worked together to craft short and long-term objectives for public and private partners to guide an ambitious and comprehensive neighborhood development agenda. As a designated "Town Center," the future of Lents is also an important component of the Metro 2040 Framework Plan.

In September 1998, the City Council established a Lents Town Center Urban Renewal Area (LTCURA) in order to accomplish community goals. These include generation of new family wage jobs, assistance to new and existing business, improvements to local infrastructure such as streets and parks, new housing construction and improvements to existing housing. Implementation of the plan began in fiscal year 1999–2000.

On May 8, 2007, PDC staff presented an overview of the plan amendment study process to the Lents Town Center Urban Renewal Advisory Committee (URAC and requested their project ideas for consideration, concerns, and feedback.

Moving forward, the Lents Town Center Plan Amendment Study revisited the existing urban renewal boundary (2,472 acres) and explored an increase in maximum indebtedness to fund community development projects. The study area for the expansion included three areas centered along major transportation corridors: Foster Road, Powell Boulevard, and 122nd Avenue.

On May 14, 2008, the PDC Board unanimously approved the Lents Town Center Resolution. On Wednesday, June 25, 2008, the City Council approved the following amendments with a 4–0 vote. The First Amendment to the Lents Town Center Urban Renewal Area will expand boundaries by 140.05 acres (0.5668 km^{2}), increase maximum indebtedness by $170 million and extend the expiration date to June 30, 2020.

The PDC is working in Lents to:

- Assist in fulfilling community goals to facilitate the emergence of Lents as a key Town Center within the Metro Region.
- Provide support for the revitalization of commercial and residential areas in and near Lents.
- Stimulate business development and investment in the area.
- Provide increased opportunities for residents to compete for new quality jobs.
- Provide housing opportunities for the Lents community’s diverse income and tenure needs.
- Improve local streets and parks.

== Notable residents ==
- Lucia H. Faxon Additon (1847-1919), social reformer, clubwoman
- Woody Guthrie lived for Lents for less than a month in 1941, although an apartment complex in Lents was named after him.

== Parks ==
- Lincoln Memorial Park Cemetery (1909)
- Lents Park (1914)
- Bloomington Park (1940)
- Glenwood Park (1941)
- Lents Community Garden (1976)
- Ed Benedict Park (1986), featuring the Portland Memory Garden (2002)
- Earl Boyles Park (1986)
- Springwater Corridor Trail (1990)
- Tenino Property (1994)
- Beggars Tick Wildlife Refuge
- Zenger Property
- I-205 Bike Path
