= Brentwood Park (Portland, Oregon) =

Public park in Portland, Oregon, U.S.

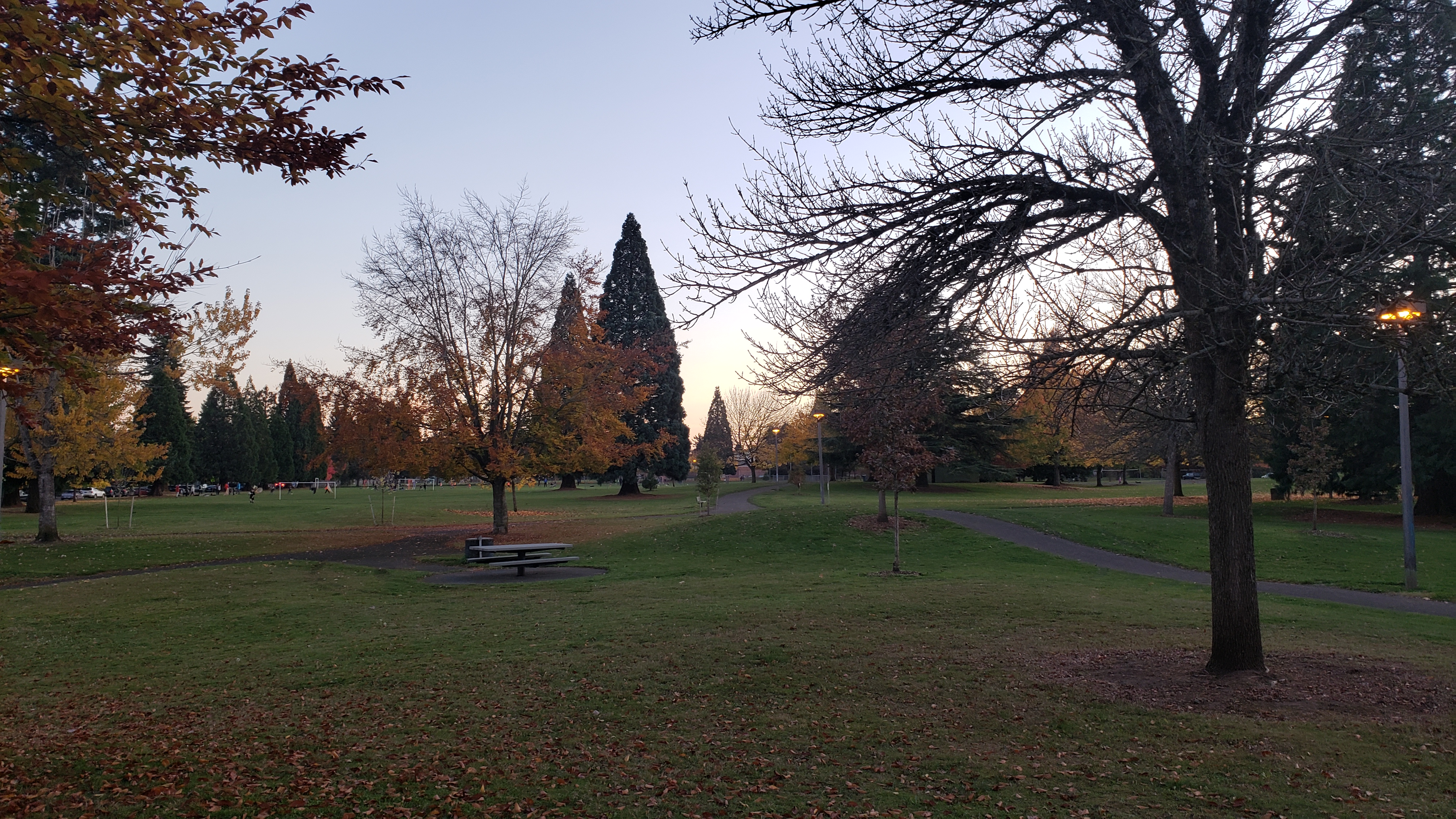
- The park in 2019

- Location within Portland, Oregon
- Interactive map of Brentwood Park
- Location: SE 60th Ave. and Duke St. Portland, Oregon
- Coordinates: 45°28′24″N 122°36′02″W
- Area: 14.06 acres (5.69 ha)
- Operator: Portland Parks & Recreation

Brentwood Park is a 14.06-acre (5.69 ha) public park in Portland, Oregon's Brentwood-Darlington neighborhood, in the United States. The park was acquired in 1951.
