= Ed Benedict Park =

Public park in Portland, Oregon, U.S.

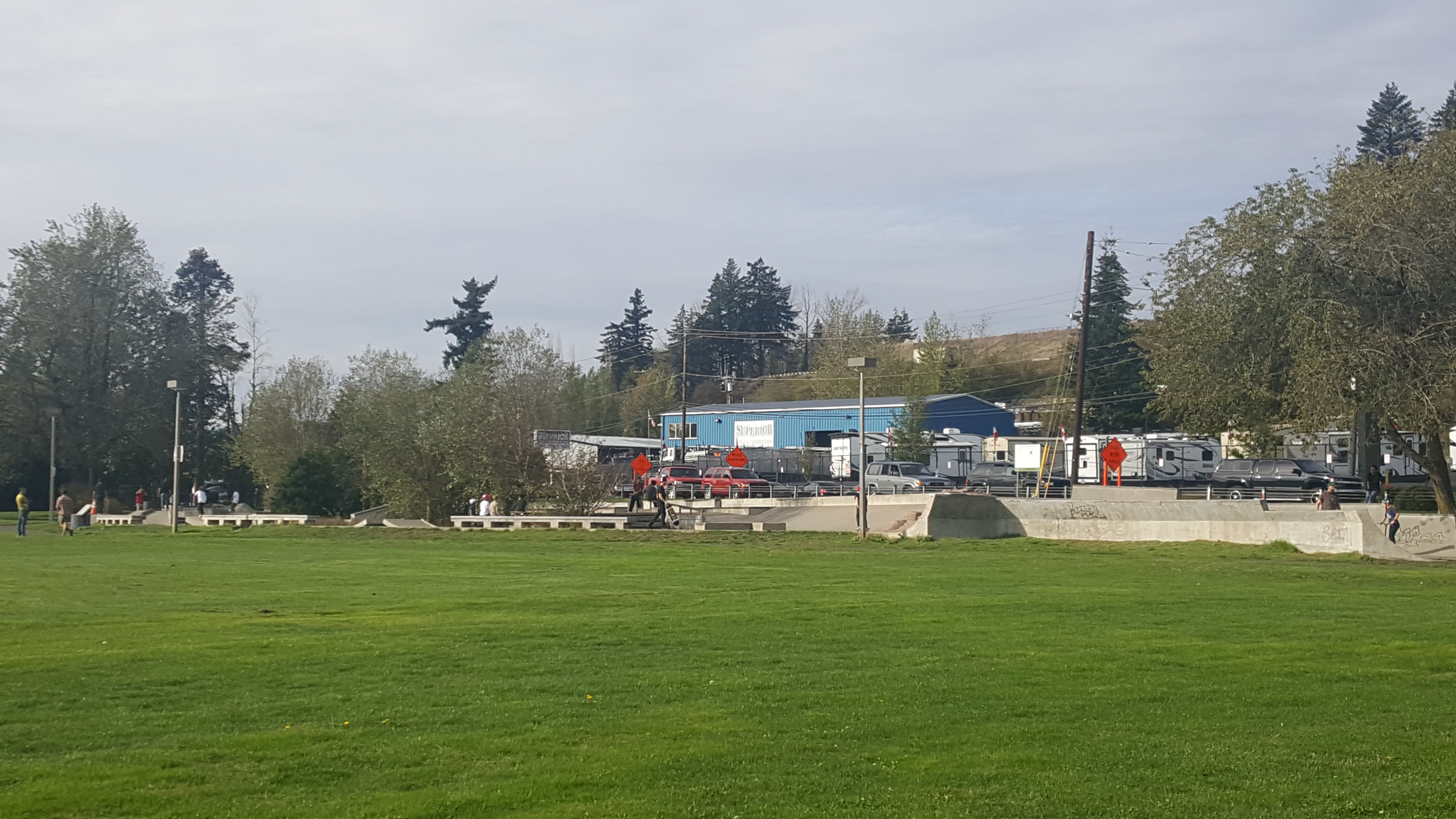
- The park's skate plaza in 2020
- Interactive map of Ed Benedict Park
- Location: SE 100th Ave. and Powell Blvd. Portland, Oregon
- Coordinates: 45°29′43″N 122°33′27″W
- Area: 12.70 acres (5.14 ha)
- Operator: Portland Parks & Recreation

Ed Benedict Park is a 12.7-acre (5.1 ha) public park in Portland, Oregon's Lents neighborhood, in the United States. The park was acquired in 1988 and features a skate plaza. The park's Portland Memory Garden was dedicated in 2002.
