= Earl Boyles Park =

Public park in Portland, Oregon, U.S.

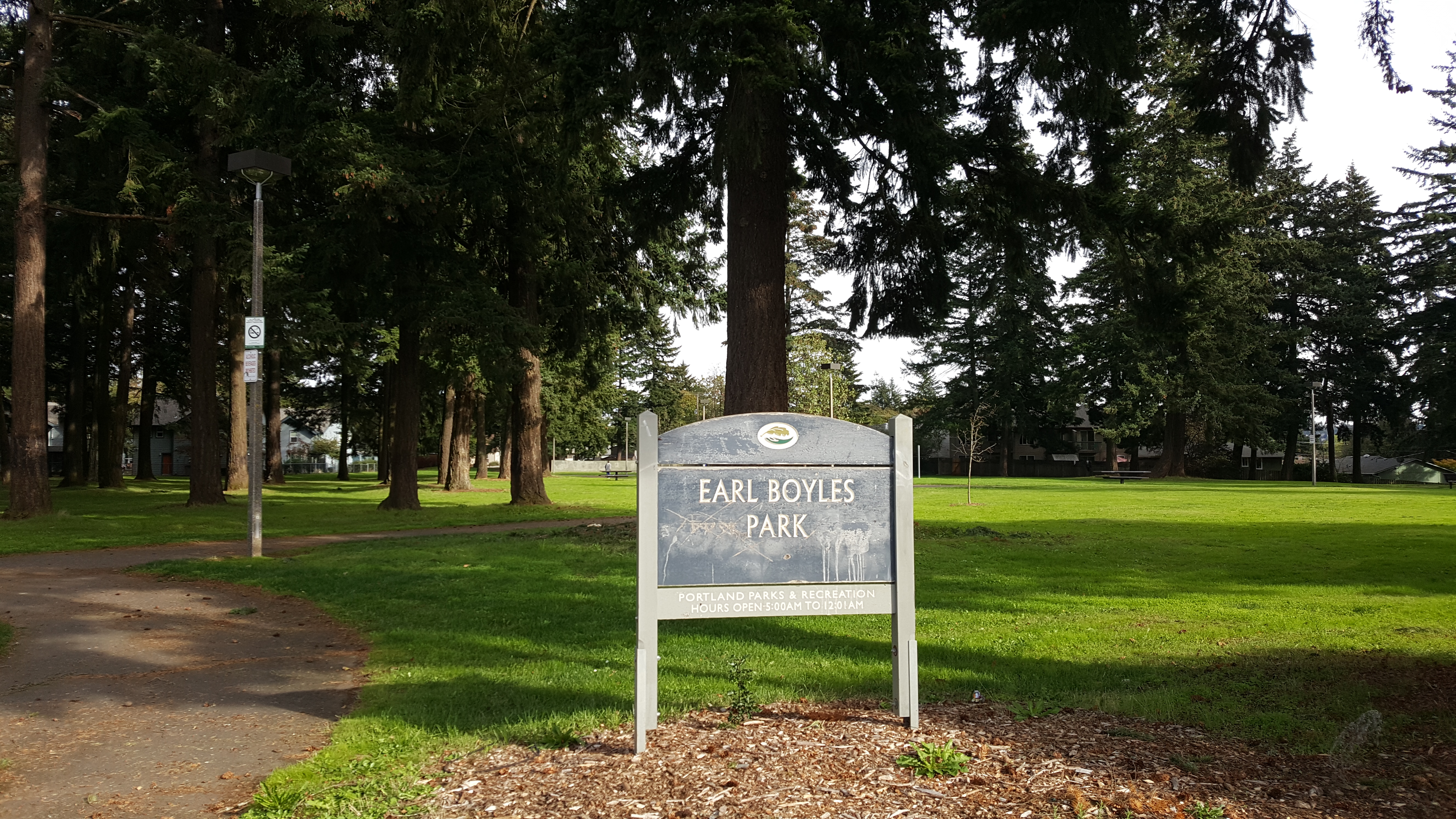
- Part of the park in 2020
- Interactive map of Earl Boyles Park
- Location: SE 112th Ave. and Boise St. Portland, Oregon
- Coordinates: 45°29′33″N 122°32′53″W
- Area: 7.84 acres (3.17 ha)
- Operator: Portland Parks & Recreation

Earl Boyles Park is a 7.84-acre (3.17 ha) public park in Portland, Oregon's Lents neighborhood, in the United States.
