= Harney Park =

Public park in Portland, Oregon, U.S.

- Location within Portland, Oregon
- Location: SE 67th Ave. and Harney St. Portland, Oregon
- Coordinates: 45°27′45″N 122°35′35″W
- Area: 6.50 acres (2.63 ha)
- Opened: 1979
- Operator: Portland Parks & Recreation

Harney Park is a 7.13-acre (2.89 ha) park at the intersection of Southeast 67th Avenue and Harney Street, in Portland, Oregon's Brentwood-Darlington neighborhood, in the United States.

== Description ==
The park, named after William S. Harney, was acquired in 1979. The Oregonian's Anna Griffin described the park as a "postage stamp-sized swath of green, a former vacant lot and eyesore that neighbors pushed to turn into a park". Features include a basketball court, playground, soccer field, and softball diamond. It has hosted a climbing wall, as well as Movies in the Park, and was one of 30 parks announced to receive basketball court improvements as part of a $1 million project funded by Nike Inc. and the Portland Trail Blazers in 2018.

== See also ==
- List of parks in Portland, Oregon
