= Bloomington Park =

Public park in Portland, Oregon, U.S.

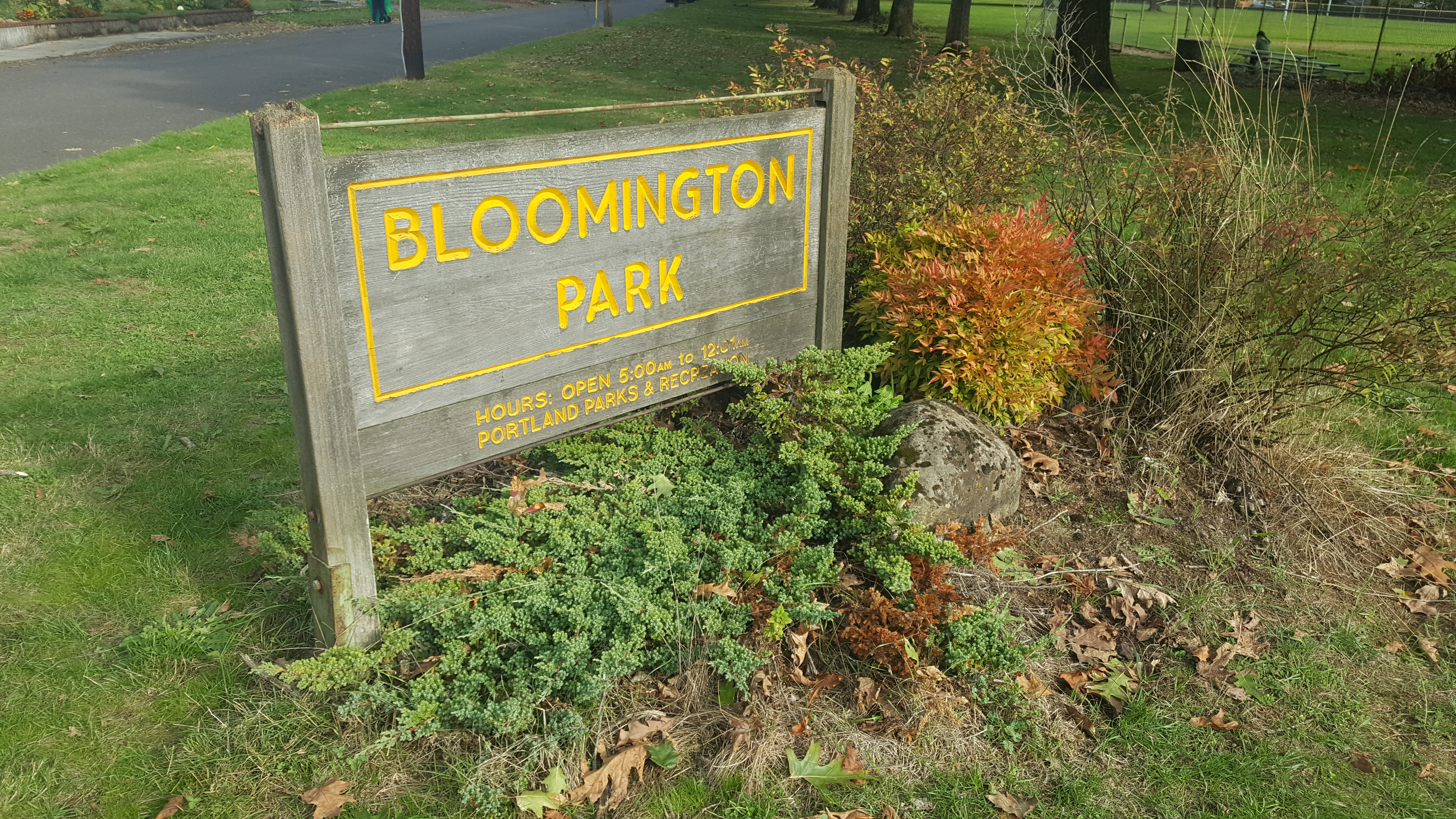
- Park signage in 2020
- Interactive map of Bloomington Park
- Location: SE 100th Ave. and Steele St. Portland, Oregon
- Coordinates: 45°29′13″N 122°33′31″W
- Area: 12.87 acres (5.21 ha)
- Operator: Portland Parks & Recreation

Bloomington Park is a 12.87-acre (5.21 ha) public park in Portland, Oregon's Lents neighborhood, in the United States. The park was acquired in 1940.
