= Mt. Scott Park =

Public park in Portland, Oregon, U.S.

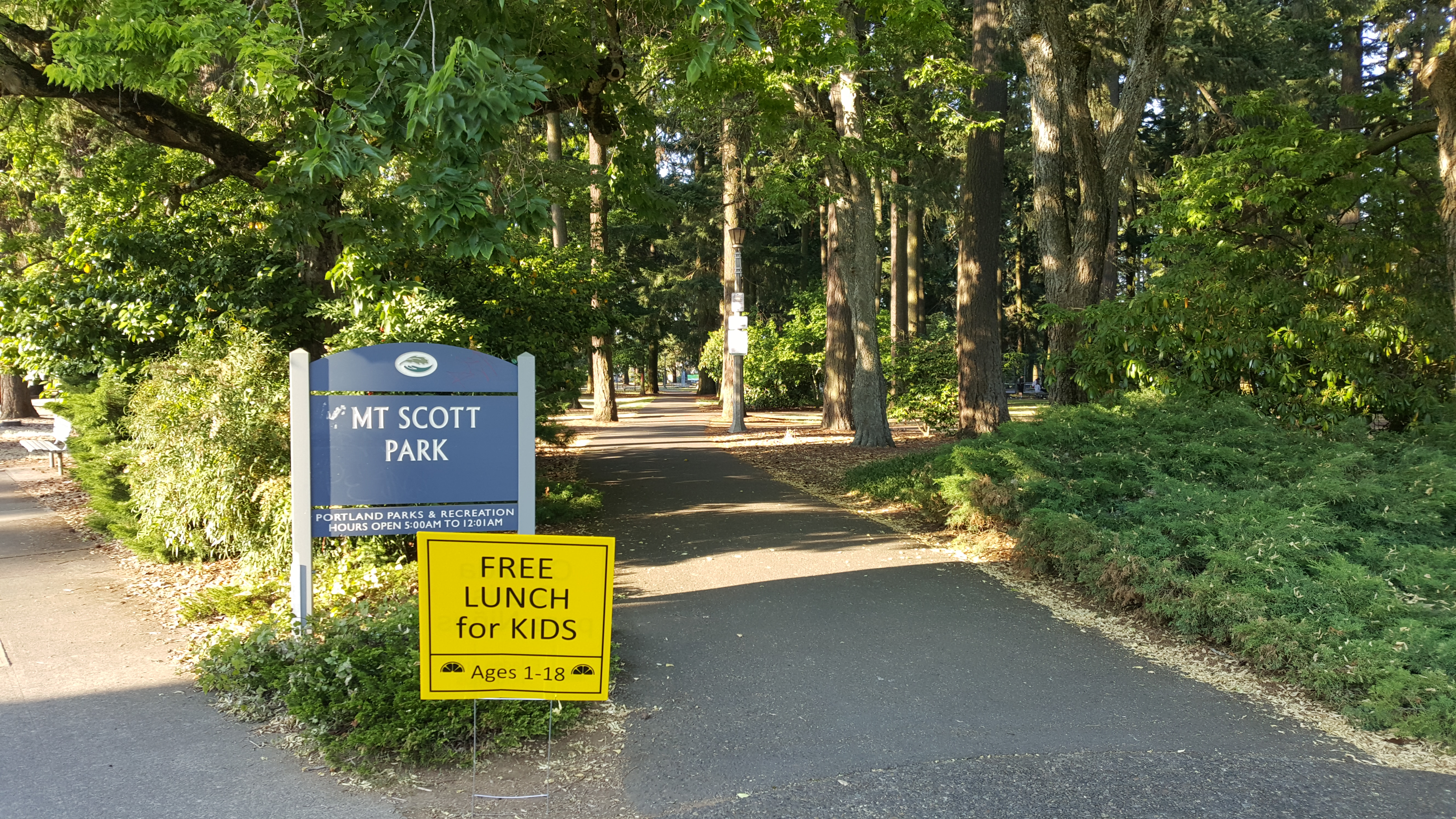
- Park signage, 2020

- Location within Portland, Oregon
- Location: SE 72nd Ave. and Harold St. Portland, Oregon
- Coordinates: 45°28′53″N 122°35′16″W
- Area: 11.22 acres (4.54 ha)
- Etymology: Harvey W. Scott
- Operator: Portland Parks & Recreation

Mt. Scott Park is an 11.22-acre (4.54 ha) public park in Portland, Oregon's Mt. Scott-Arleta neighborhood, in the United States. Named after Harvey W. Scott, the park was acquired in 1922 and houses the Mt. Scott Community Center.

== Description and history ==
The park was the starting point for the World Naked Bike Ride in 2016.

=== Mt. Scott Community Center ===
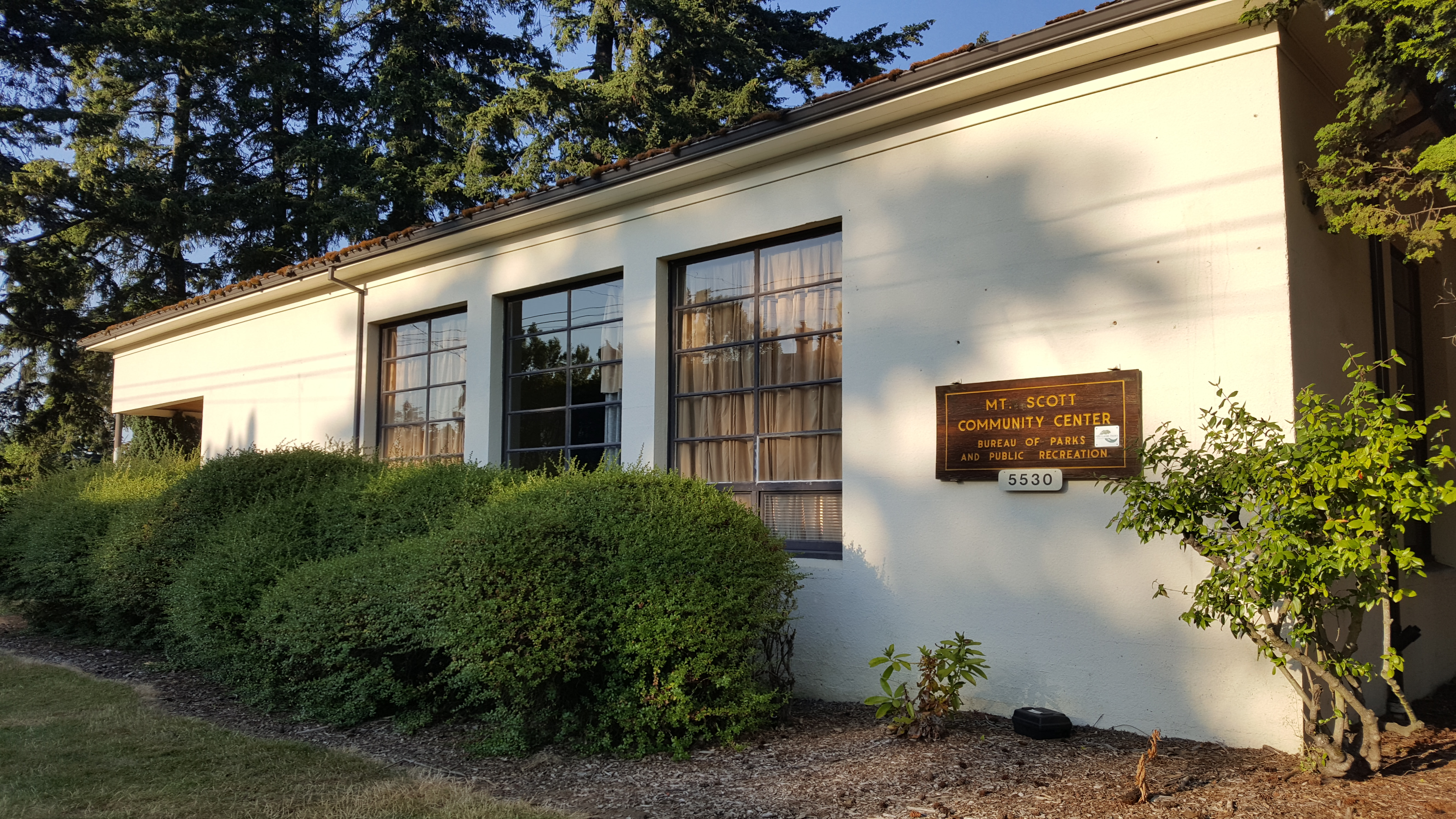
Exterior of the Mt. Scott Community Center, 2020

The Mt. Scott Community Center was built in 1927, and acquired by Portland Parks and Recreation in 1949.

The community center has served as a temporary homeless shelter.
