= Glenwood Park (Portland, Oregon) =

Public park in Portland, Oregon, U.S.

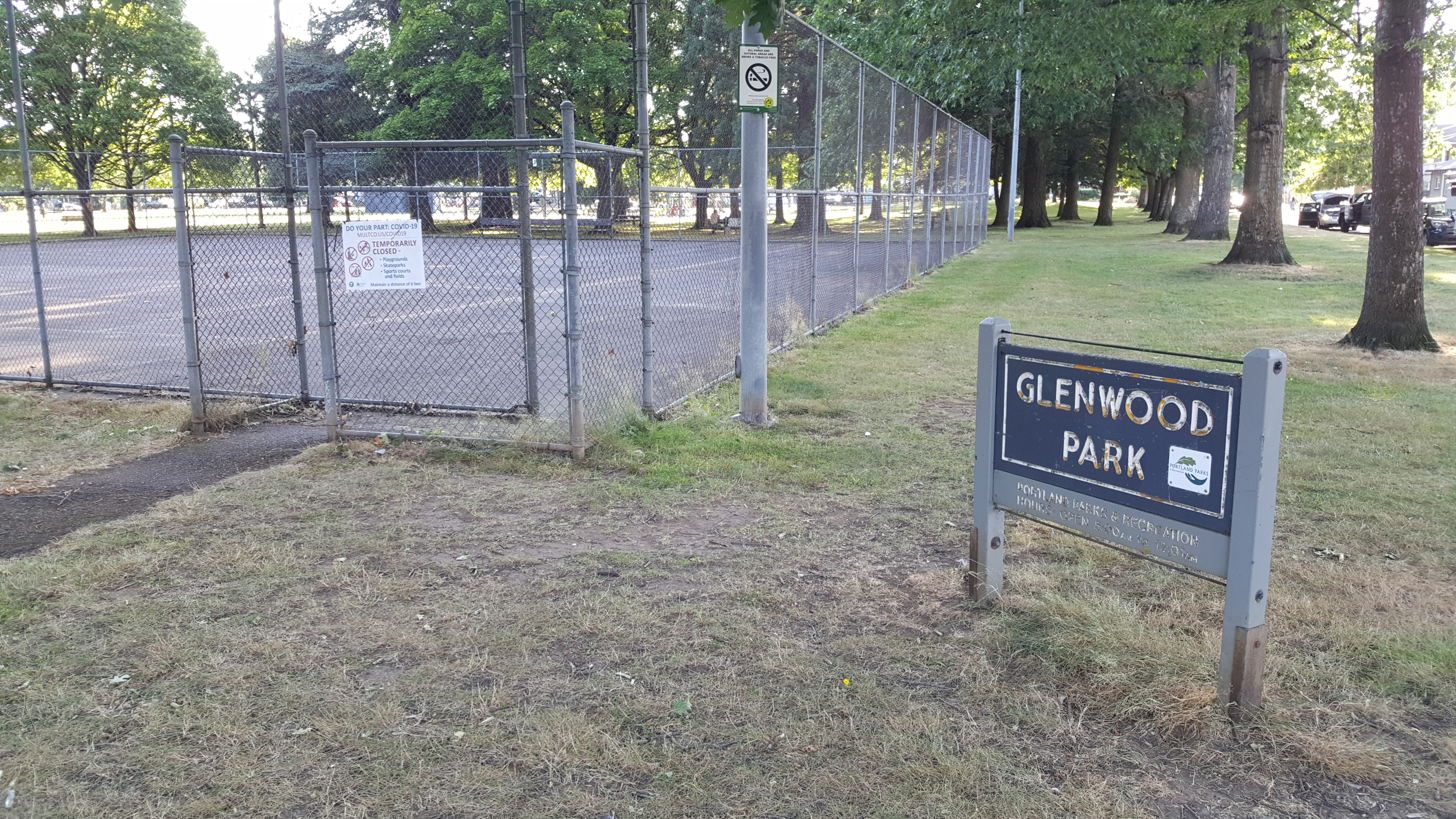
- Park signage, 2020

- Location within Portland, Oregon
- Location: SE 87th Ave. and Claybourne St. Portland, Oregon
- Coordinates: 45.473504°N 122.571800°W
- Area: 7.30 acres (2.95 ha)
- Operator: Portland Parks & Recreation

Glenwood Park is a 7.3-acre (3.0 ha) public park in Portland, Oregon's Lents neighborhood, in the United States. The park was acquired in 1941.
