= Portland Memory Garden =

Garden and public park in Portland, Oregon, U.S.

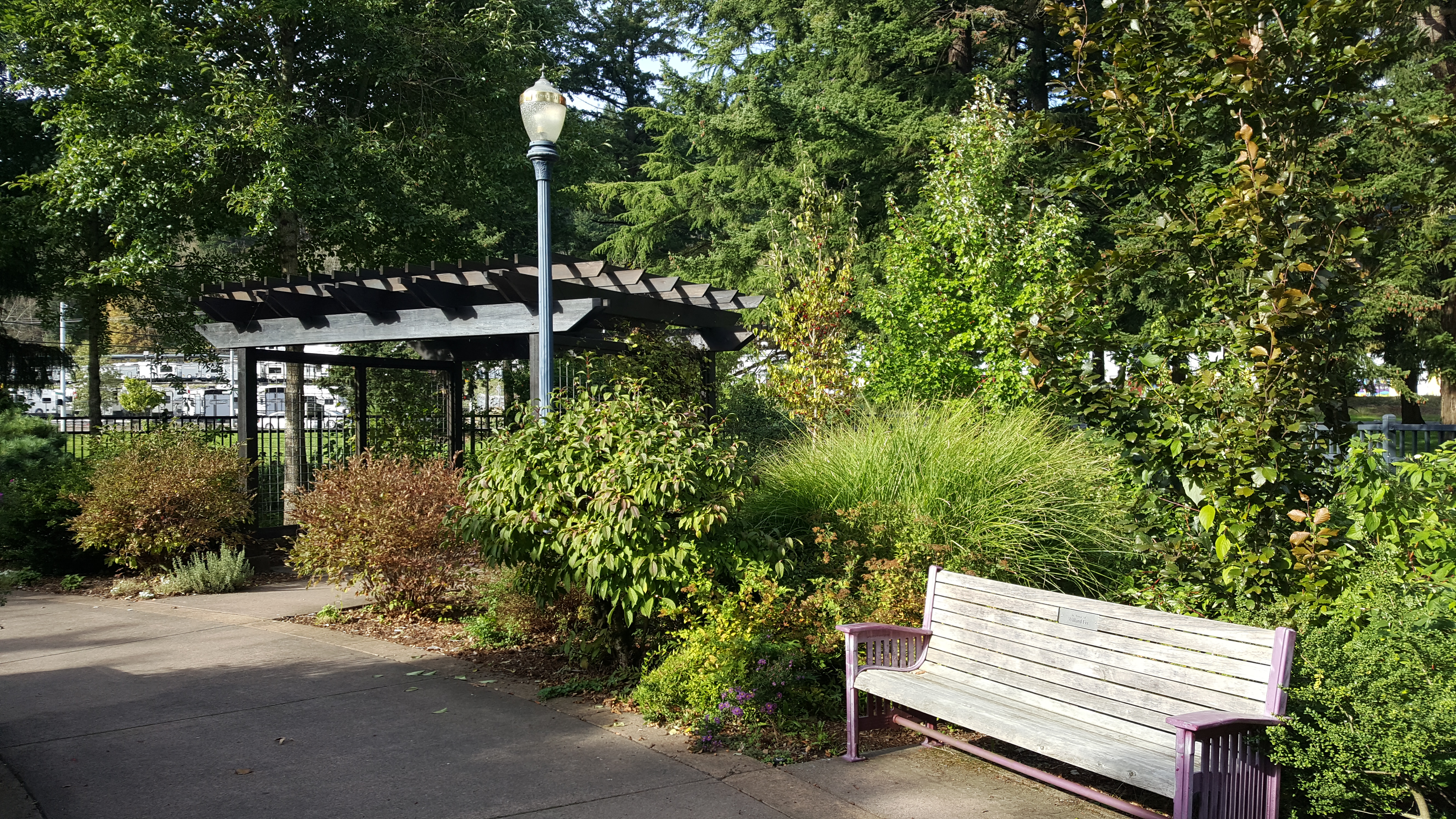
- Part of the garden in 2020

- Location within Portland, Oregon
- Location: 10401 Southeast Bush Street, Portland, Oregon, U.S.
- Coordinates: 45°29′42″N 122°33′30″W

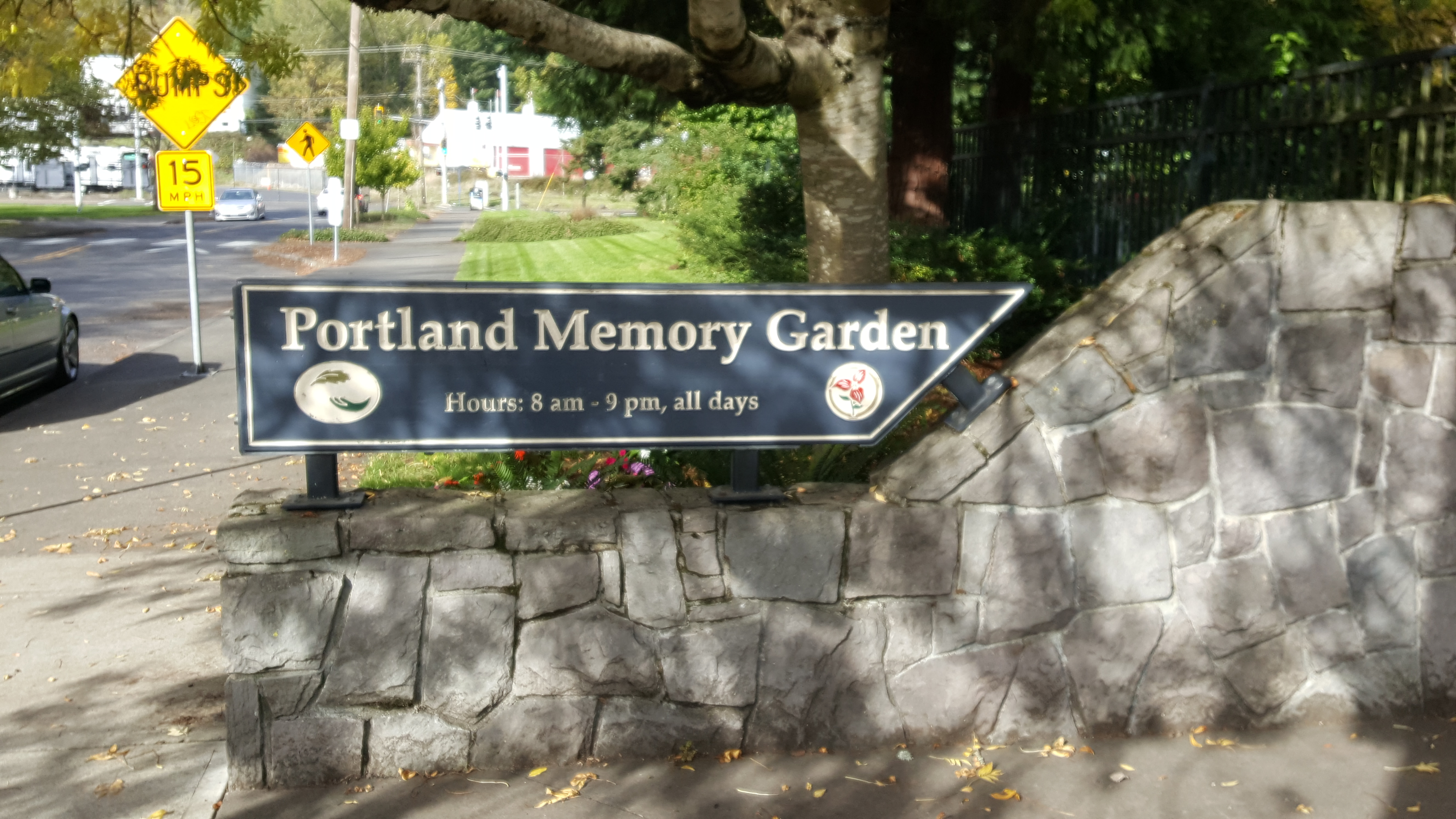
Sign for the garden, 2020

The Portland Memory Garden is a garden and park in Portland, Oregon's Lents neighborhood, in the United States.

== Description ==
The garden, part of Ed Benedict Park, is designed for people with Alzheimer's disease and other memory issues. The project was a collaboration of the following groups: American Society of Landscape Architects, Center of Design for an Aging Society, Legacy Health Systems, Oregon-Greater Idaho Chapter of the Alzheimer's Association, Portland Parks & Recreation, and Portland State University's School of Urban Studies & Planning.

== History ==
The garden was dedicated in May 2002.
