= Flavel Park =

Public park in Portland, Oregon, U.S.

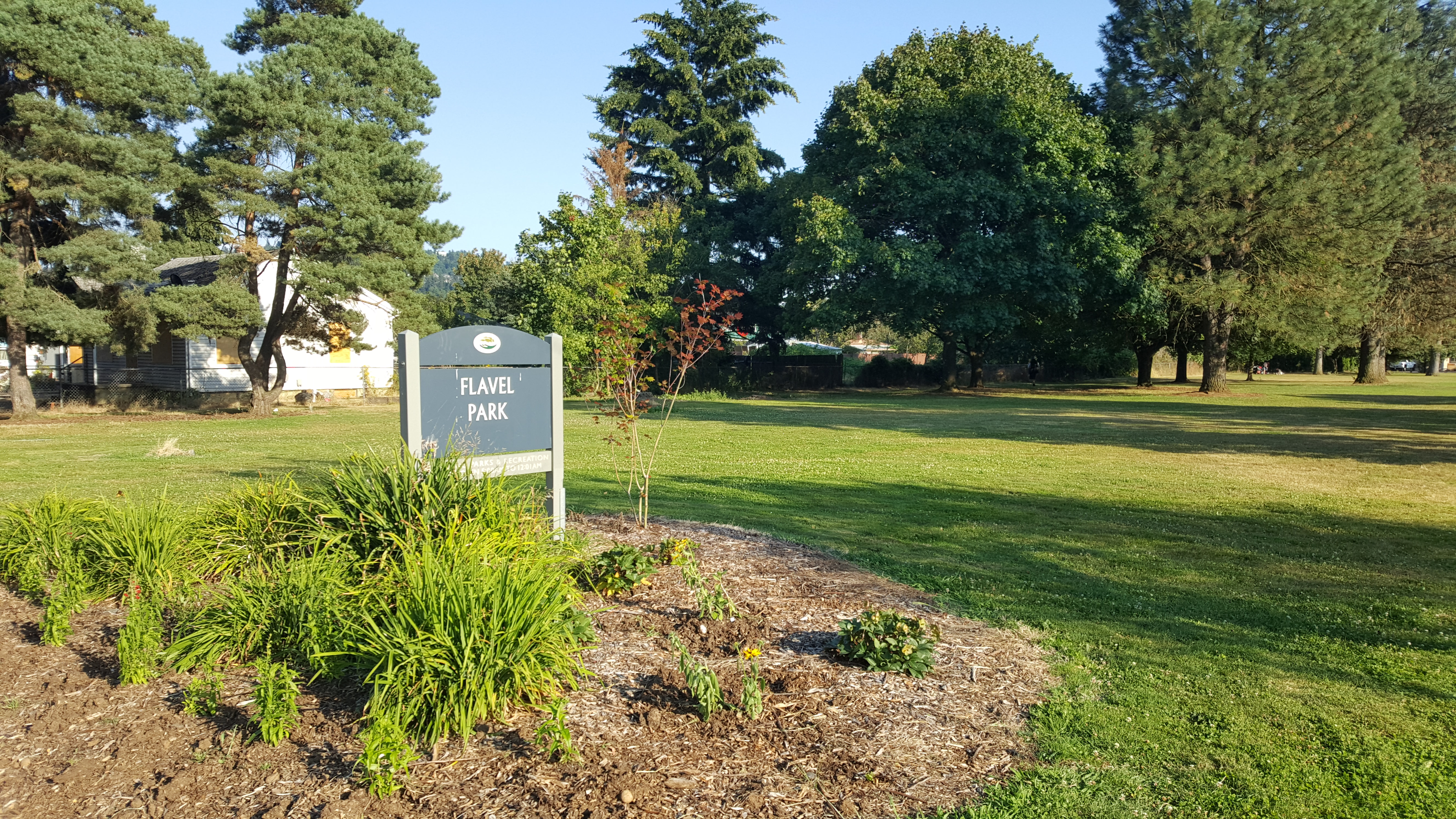
- Signage for the park, 2020
- Interactive map of Flavel Park
- Location: SE 75th Ave. and Flavel St. Portland, Oregon
- Coordinates: 45°28′21″N 122°35′0″W
- Area: 4.20 acres (1.70 ha)
- Established: 1953
- Operator: Portland Parks & Recreation
- Open: 5:00 am – midnight

Flavel Park is a 4.20-acre (1.70 ha) public park in Portland, Oregon's Brentwood-Darlington neighborhood, in the United States. The park was acquired in 1953.
