= Hazeltine Park =

Public park in Portland, Oregon, U.S.

- Location within Portland, Oregon
- Location: 5416 SE Flavel Dr. Portland, Oregon
- Coordinates: 45.46548°N 122.60783°W
- Area: 1.02 acres (0.41 ha)
- Opened: 2001
- Operator: Portland Parks & Recreation

Hazeltine Park is a 1.02-acre (0.41 ha) park located at 5416 Southeast Flavel Drive, in Portland, Oregon's Brentwood-Darlington neighborhood, in the United States. The park, acquired in 2001, is named after Dick Hazeltine, who is considered the neighborhood's "founder".

== See also ==
- List of parks in Portland, Oregon
