= Brentwood-Darlington, Portland, Oregon =

Neighborhood in Portland, Oregon, US

Brentwood-Darlington
- Neighborhood
- Interactive map of Brentwood-Darlington
- Coordinates: 45°28′07″N 122°35′50″W
- Country: United States
- State: Oregon
- City: Portland

Government
  - Association: Brentwood/Darlington Neighborhood Association
  - Coalition: Southeast Uplift

Area
  - Total: 1.75 sq mi (4.5 km^{2})

Population (2020)
  - Total: 13,536
  - Density: 7,735/sq mi (2,987/km^{2})

Housing
  - No. of households: 5126
  - Occupancy rate: 95.7% occupied
  - Owner-occupied: 3210 households (67%)
  - Renting: 1590 households (33%)
  - Avg. household size: 2.6 persons

Brentwood-Darlington is a neighborhood on the southern edge of Portland, Oregon, bordering SE 45th Avenue to the west, SE Duke Street to the north, and SE 82nd Avenue to the east. The county line separating Multnomah County from Clackamas County forms most of the neighborhood's (and the city's) southern boundary, though small portions of the neighborhood and the city extend into Clackamas County. (Conversely, some areas in the neighborhood in Multnomah County are outside Portland city limits.) Roughly, the southern boundary is SE Harney Drive on the eastern one-fourth, and SE Clatsop Street on the other three-quarters.

The Brentwood-Darlington Neighborhood Association dates to 1974 when it was founded as the Errol Heights Improvement Association, serving the neighborhoods of Errol Heights, Brentwood, Darlington, Harney Park, Woodmere, and Crystal Springs. In 2013, the Brentwood-Darlington Neighborhood Association held a 'visioning' process to determine future plans for the neighborhood.

The neighborhood is home to several large scale urban gardening projects, including the Brentwood Community Garden, which was improved and expanded in 2010 through a grant from The Home Depot and Fiskars. It is also home to the Portland State University Learning Gardens Laboratory.

Brentwood-Darlington includes Brentwood Park (1951), Errol Heights Natural Area (1966), and Hazeltine Park (2001), which was named after longtime neighborhood resident and leader, Dick Hazeltine.

== Demographics ==
In 2020, 13,536 lived in Brentwood-Darlington. 67% of people identified as white, 12.8% as Asian, 5.0% as Black or African American, 3.5% as American Indian or Alaska Native, 0.8% as Native Hawaiian or Pacific Islander, and 11.2% as some other race. 13.9% identified as Hispanic or Latino. The median age in Boise was 37.6. The median household income was listed at $69,000 and 22% of the neighborhood was covered by tree canopy. 67% of residents voted in the 2020 general election.

As of the 2010 census, Brentwood-Darlington had a population of 12,994. The residents of the area identified as 72.0% White, 10.4% Asian, 3.6% Black, 1.6% American Indian, and 5.4% are mixed race. Of the population, 13.9% identify as Hispanic or Latino.

== History ==
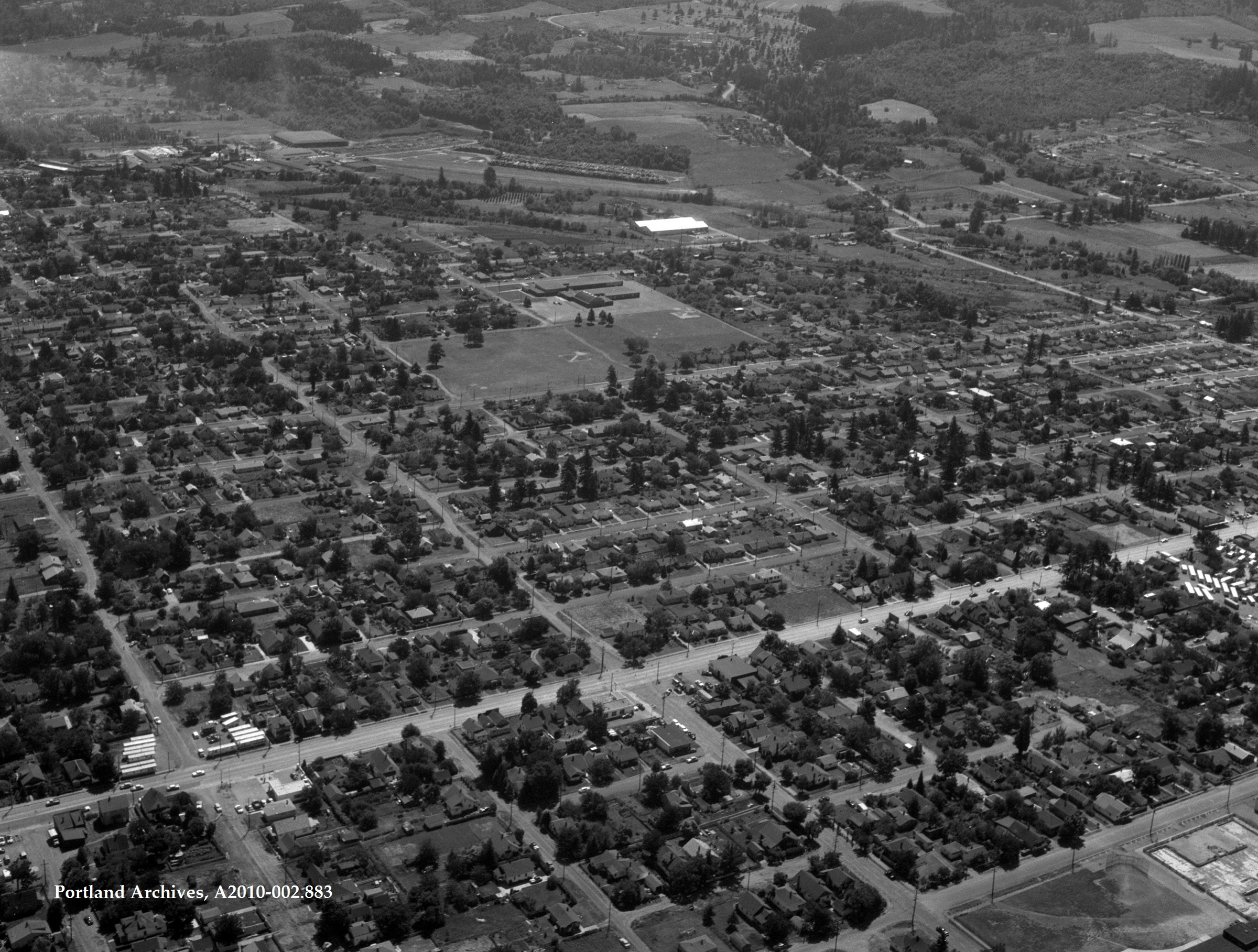
SE 82nd and Duke 1958

Brentwood-Darlington started as single family homesteads in 1882. The streets were divided into a grid pattern with long blocks with many of the roads leading to the nearby town of Milwaukie rather than Portland. The Donation Land Claim Act of 1850 granted settlers to unsurveyed land for promotion of settlement across the Oregon Territory. Settlers of the area took advantage of the land claim act and George Wills, a Baptist preacher and farmer eventually claimed ownership to the majority of the land in the area.

in 1920 the Apostolic Faith International Headquarters formerly the Apostolic Faith Meeting Park was established

World War II brought an influx of people into the area and lead to rapid growth in the community. It was common to see homeowners run small businesses out of their homes during this time. As an unincorporated neighborhood of Portland many homes were inadequately constructed and roads in a state of disarray due to the lack of services in the area. Yearly grass and hazel brush fires along with runaway fires from a local sawmill lead to the first fire department to the area in 1947.

In 1974 Brentwood-Darlington was made an officially designated neighborhood under the name Errol Heights. Brentwood-Darlington received many attempts of annexation into Portland in 1961, 1971, and 1977 but the efforts made failed due to opposition of the residents of the area. Annexation attempts were revived in the 1980s due to concerns of pollution and inadequate water service and the area was successfully annexed into Portland in 1986. The former name of Errol Heights was changed to Brentwood-Darlington in February 1986.

== Parks ==
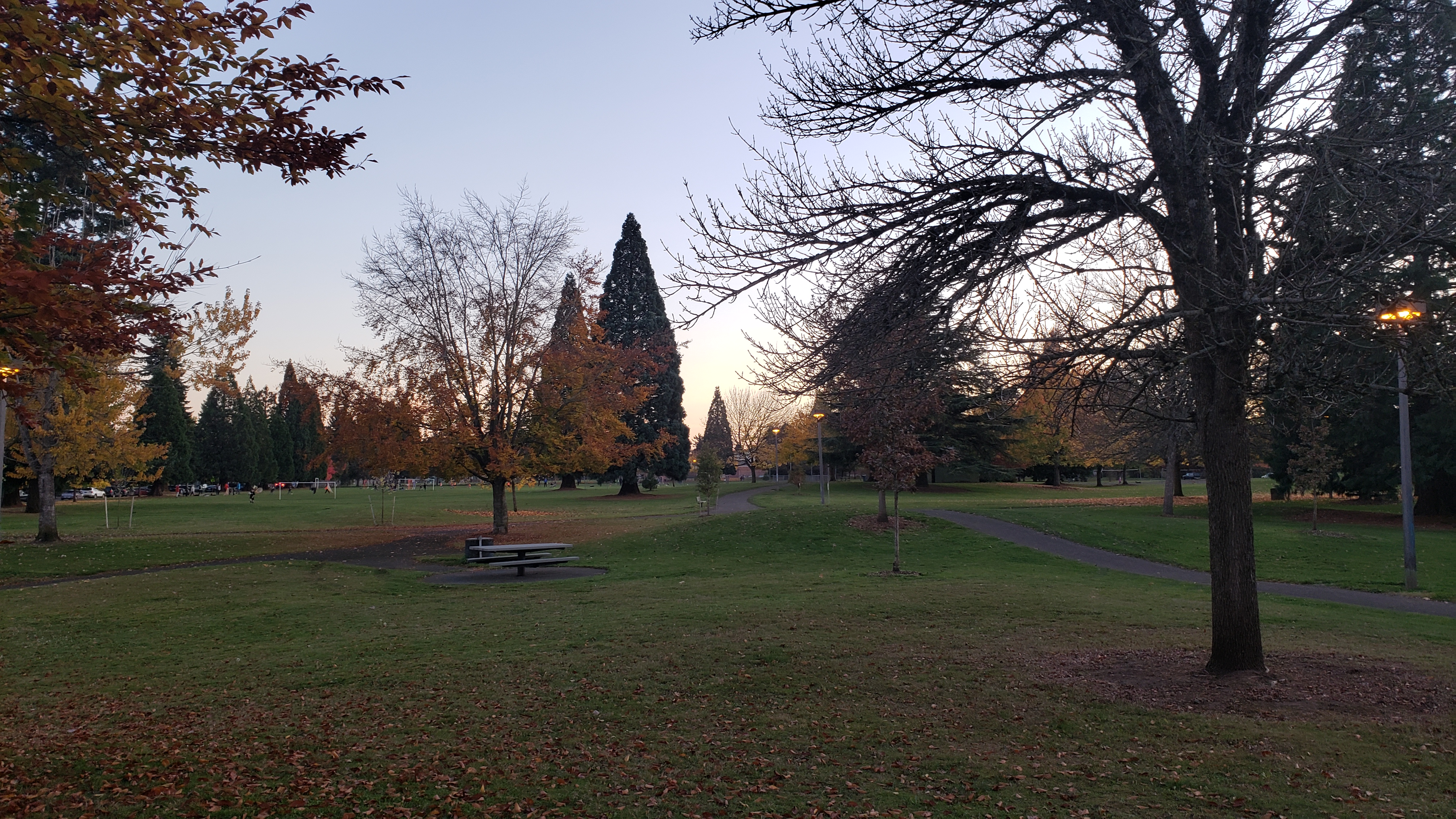
Brentwood Park, Fall 2019

- Brentwood Park (1951)
- Errol Heights Park (1966)
- Flavel Park (1953)
- Harney Park (1979)
- Hazeltine Park (2001)
