= Mt. Scott-Arleta, Portland, Oregon =

Neighborhood in Portland, Oregon, U.S.

Mt. Scott-Arleta
- Neighborhood
- Location in Portland
- Coordinates: 45°28′59″N 122°35′28″W
- Country: United States
- State: Oregon
- City: Portland

Government
  - Association: Mt. Scott-Arleta Neighborhood Association
  - Coalition: Southeast Uplift

Area
  - Total: 0.86 sq mi (2.24 km^{2})

Population (2010)
  - Total: 7,397
  - Density: 8,550/sq mi (3,300/km^{2})

Housing
  - No. of households: 3,222
  - Occupancy rate: 96% occupied
  - Owner-occupied: 1,840 households (57%)
  - Renting: 1,249 households (39%)
  - Avg. household size: 2.30 persons

The Mt. Scott-Arleta neighborhood of Portland, Oregon is located in the city's southeast quadrant. It is bounded on the north by SE Foster Road, west by SE 60th Avenue, east by SE 82nd Avenue, and south by SE Duke. Mt. Scott-Arleta borders the neighborhoods of Woodstock on the west, Foster-Powell on the north, Lents on the east, and Brentwood-Darlington on the south.

The neighborhood has Mt. Scott Park, which contains Mt. Scott Community Center. It is served by Portland Public Schools, with a local elementary school, Arleta Elementary, and is in the attendance area for Kellogg Middle School and Franklin High School.

== History ==
=== Origins and settlement ===
When the City of Portland was established in 1851, one of the prominent routes used by settlers entering Portland was a Native American trail that served as the northern fork of the Oregon Trail. This "farm-to-market" road was named after Philip Foster, owner of a well-known farm and trading post near Estacada. Foster was married to Mary Charlotte Pettygrove, sister to F.W. Pettygrove, one of the founders of Portland. SE 82nd Avenue provided a connection for travelers leaving boats at the Columbia River and traveling south to Oregon City and points beyond. The intersection of SE Foster Road and SE 82nd Ave became important as it connected SE 82nd Ave to Powell Valley Road, which ran to downtown Portland. A large portion of the land within the current borders of Mt. Scott Arleta was first owned by Issac Williams through an 1855 Donation Land Claim. With his wife and four children, he moved from Pennsylvania and settled here in November 1855. Subsequent large landowners included Daniel Little and Ypsilanti Smith.

=== Later development ===
By the turn of the 20th century, the Mt. Scott trolley line had connected downtown Portland with the town of Lents, to the east. The trolley line ran through the heart of the future neighborhood: east along SE Foster Road, south on SE 72nd Avenue, then east on SE Woodstock Blvd. Itself named after the nearby mountain, the Mt. Scott trolley line gives the neighborhood part of its name. The "golden age" of Portland trolley lines in the early 20th century led to rapid expansion of Portland and its suburbs. The subdivision of Arleta Park was platted in 1903 by the Potter-Chapin Realty company, and was named after Potter's daughter. Although this subdivision gives Mt. Scott Arleta the other part of its name, the plat only forms a small part of the neighborhood; other subdivisions include Chicago, Kenwood Park, Third Electric Addition, Upton Park, Woodmere, Tremont, parts of Marysville and Firland, and many many others. Many of the people who moved to these subdivisions at this time were non-English speaking German immigrants.

== Culture ==
Mt. Scott-Arleta neighborhood life is centered on Mt. Scott Park and the Mt. Scott Community Center within it. First constructed in 1927 as a wood-frame bathhouse for a pre-existing outdoor pool, the Community Center now houses an aquatic center added in 2000.

== Gallery ==
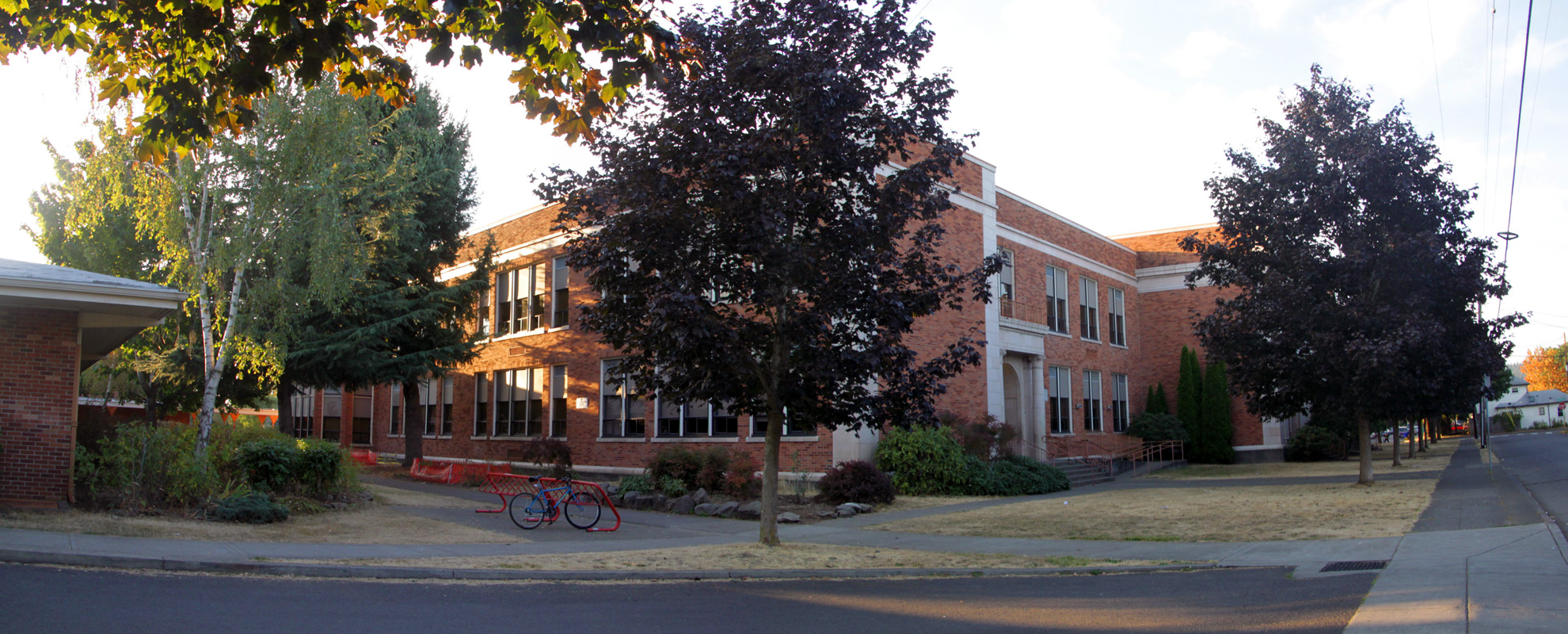
Arleta Elementary School

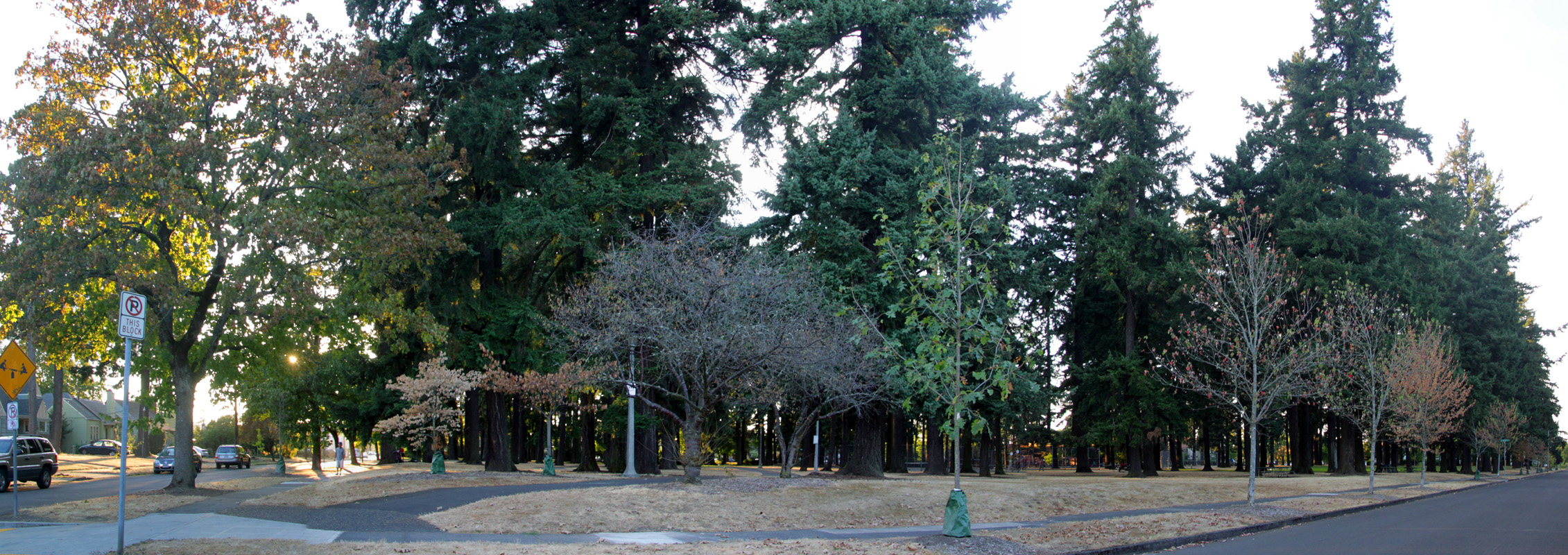
Mt. Scott Park

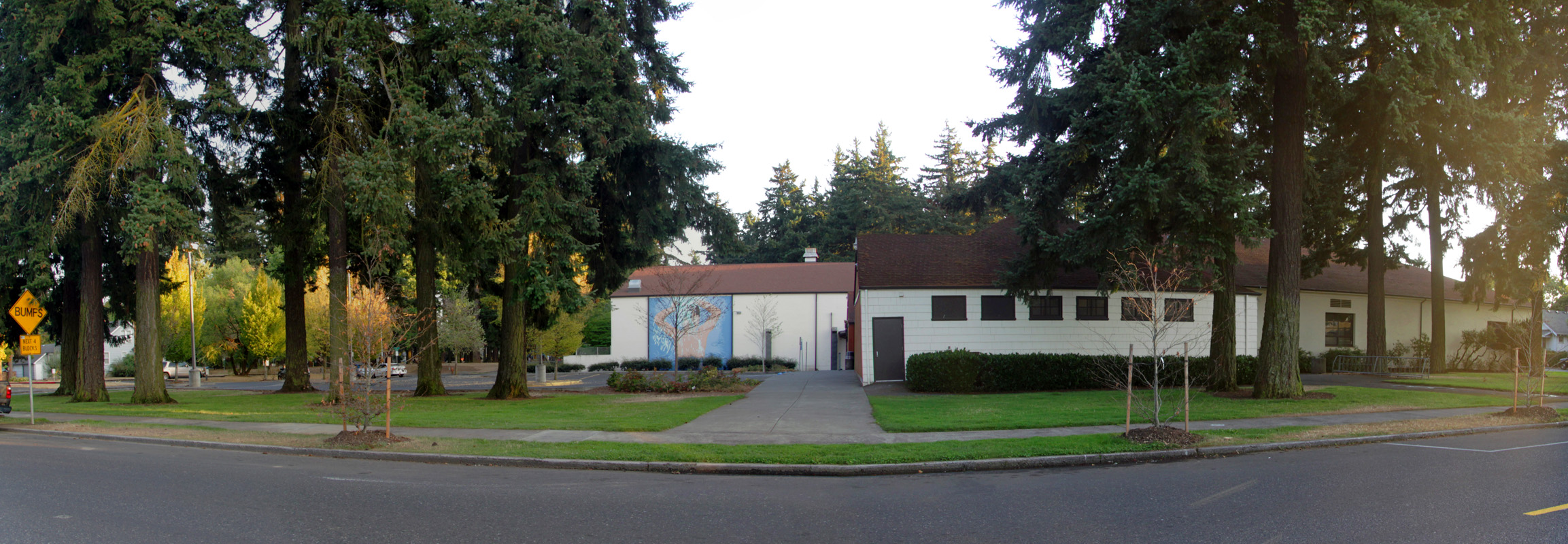
Mt. Scott Community Center, north face

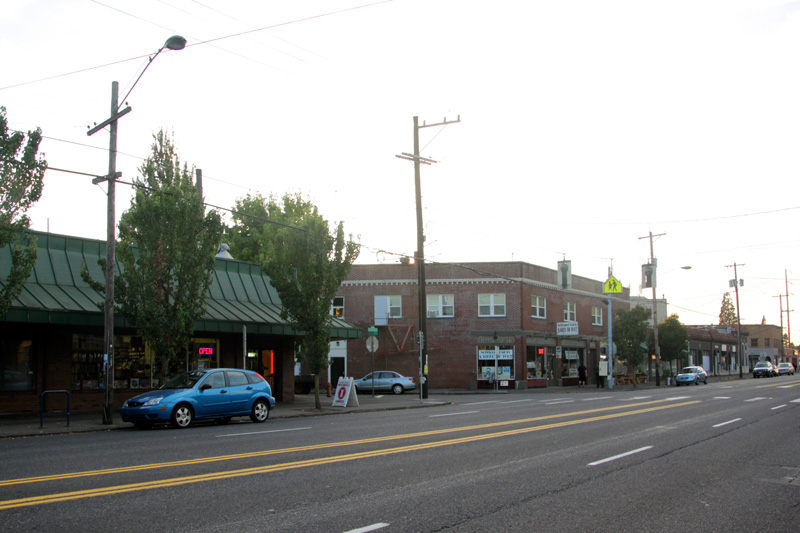
6300 block of SE Foster Road

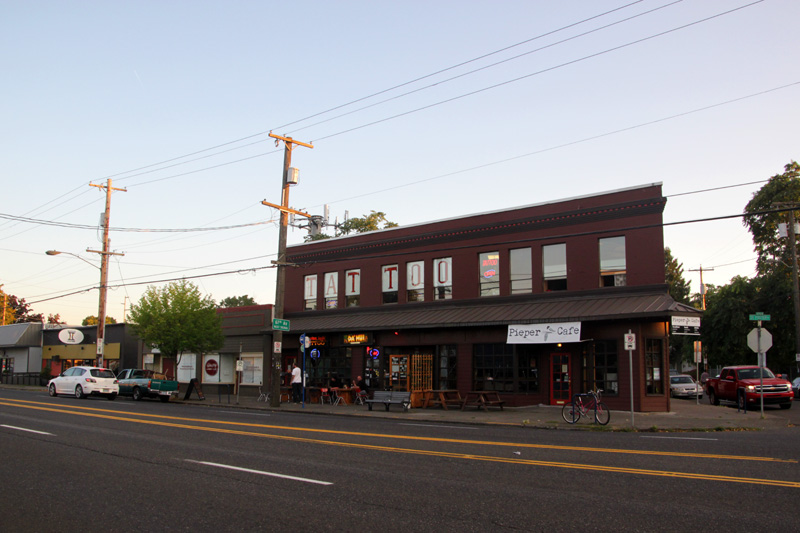
6500 block of SE Foster Road

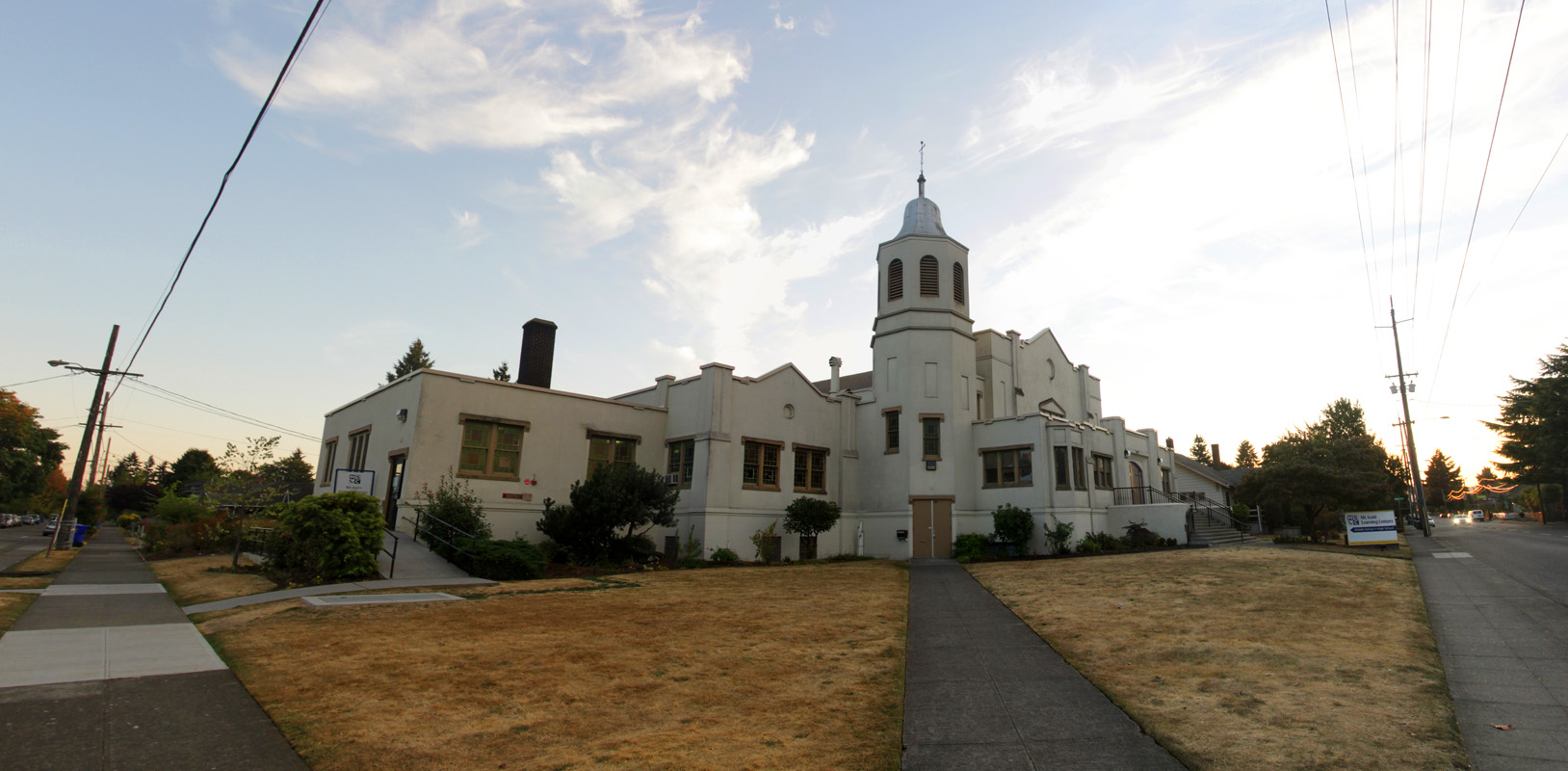
The former Laurelwood United Methodist Church, now a learning academy
