= Jacques and Amelia Reinhart House =

Historic building in Portland, Oregon, U.S.

- U.S. National Register of Historic Places
- Portland Historic Landmark
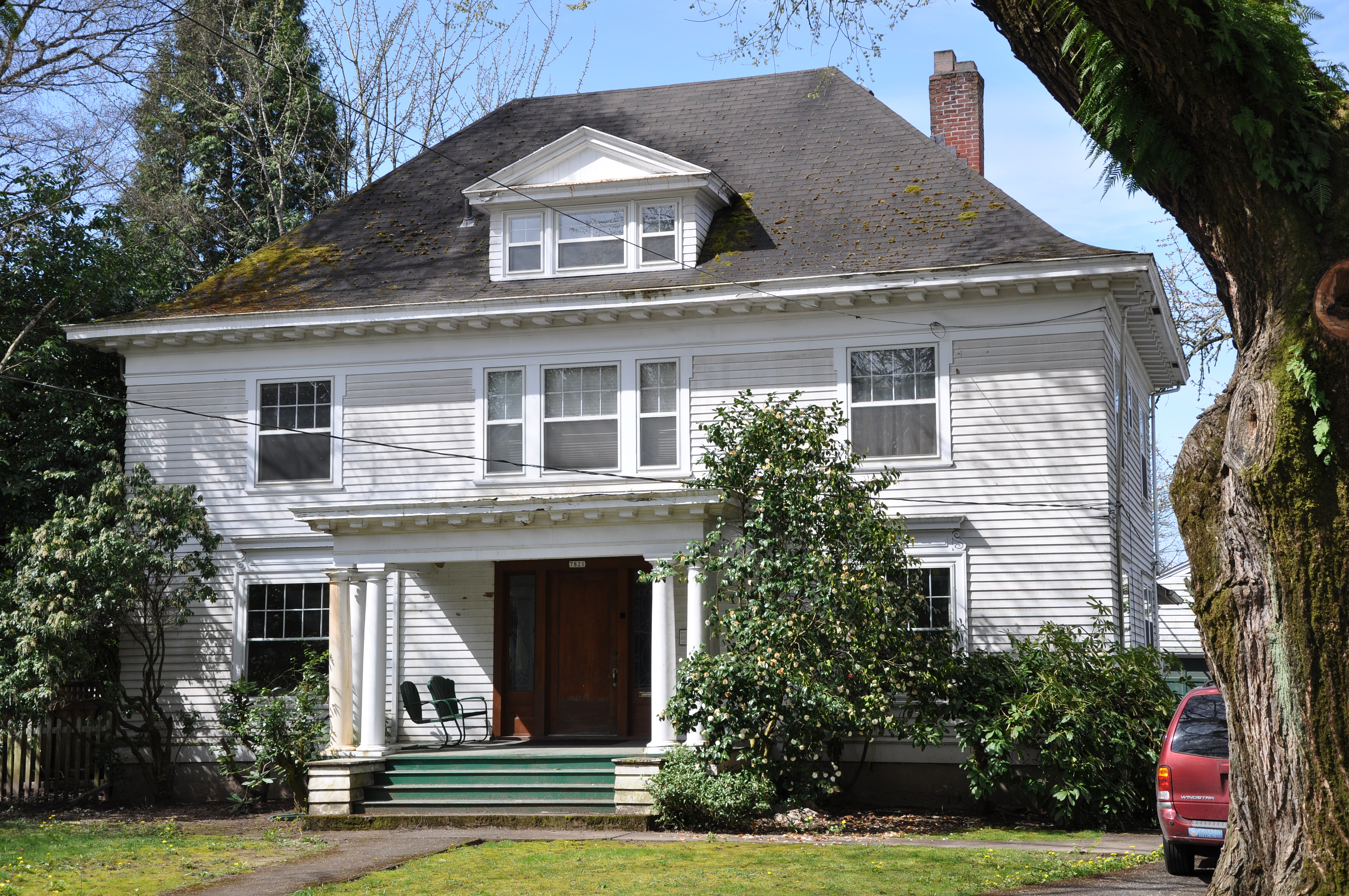
- The Reinhart House in 2012
- Location: 7821 SE 30th Avenue; Portland, Oregon
- Coordinates: 45°28′04″N 122°37′58″W
- Area: 47 by 30 feet (14.3 by 9.1 m)
- Built: 1911
- Architect: Jacobberger and Smith
- Architectural style: Colonial Revival
- NRHP reference No.: 85003081
- Added to NRHP: December 2, 1985

The Jacques and Amelia Reinhart House in southeast Portland in the U.S. state of Oregon is a 2.5-story dwelling listed on the National Register of Historic Places. A Colonial Revival structure built in 1911, it was added to the register in 1985. It was the first house built in Portland's Eastmoreland district, near Reed College.

== See also ==
- National Register of Historic Places listings in Southeast Portland, Oregon
