= List of parks in Portland, Oregon =

The city of Portland, Oregon, has more than 10,000 acres (4,000 ha) of public parks and other natural areas.

Portland is home to one of the largest municipal parks in the United States, Forest Park, as well as the smallest park in the United States—at 61 centimetres (24 in) in diameter—Mill Ends Park.

The development of Portland's park system was largely guided by the 1903 Olmsted Portland park plan. There are at least 279 parks and natural areas in Portland. Most of these are operated by Portland Parks & Recreation, though the State of Oregon, Metro regional government, the Portland Water Bureau, and the Federal Government also operate parks as well.

== Portland Parks & Recreation ==
=== North Portland ===
Name	Image	Location	Size	Description
Arbor Lodge Park	Wooden sign with text identifying the name, management, and hours of operation for the park; in the background is a green lawn, part of a building, and two people.	N Bryant St. and Delaware Ave.	8.4 acres (3.4 ha)	Acquired in 1940, Arbor Lodge Park includes a dog off-leash area, horseshoe pit, paved paths, picnic tables, playground, soccer field, softball field, public art, and tennis courts.
Cathedral Park	A series of arches on the underside of a bridge; trees and a manicured lawn are visible in the background.	N Edison St. and Pittsburg Ave.	23.09 acres (9.34 ha)	Acquired in 1968, Cathedral Park includes a boat dock, boat ramp, canoe launch, disabled access restroom, dog off-leash area, paths—paved, picnic tables, and stage. The park is named for the cathedral-like arches of the St. John's Bridge.
Chimney Park	In the forefront is a large rock along with a sign displaying the name, management, and hours of operation for the park; in the background is a lawn and scattered trees.	9360 N Columbia Blvd.	18.39 acres (7.44 ha)	Acquired in 1932, Chimney Park includes a fenced off-leash area for dogs. Located on the one-time site of the city's incinerator, the park is named for the incinerator's chimney, which has since been removed.
Columbia Park	The playground at Columbia Park	N Lombard St. and Woolsey Ave.	35.37 acres (14.31 ha)	Acquired in 1891, Columbia Park includes baseball, softball and soccer fields; tennis and volleyball courts; an accessible playground; a picnic area; and a splash pad. The park was acquired to be the City of Albina's first park, but it was not developed until after the cities of Albina and Portland were consolidated.
Dawson Park	Dawson Park	N Stanton St. and Williams Ave.	2.05 acres (0.83 ha)	Acquired in 1921, Dawson Park includes basketball and volleyball courts, picnic areas, an accessible playground, and a stage. The park is named after Rev. John Dawson, an Episcopal minister and advocate for child welfare and civic improvement.
Delta Park	A two-tiered building with a green roof, surrounded by paved paths, light poles, and trees.	N Denver Ave. and Martin Luther King Jr. Blvd.	87.47 acres (35.40 ha)	Acquired in 1950, Delta Park includes a dog off-leash area—fenced, football field, paths—paved, picnic tables, playground, soccer field, softball field, and volleyball court. Delta Park is built on the site of Vanport, the war-time city destroyed by flood in 1948.
Farragut Park	A rainbow over the softball field at Farragut Park	N Kerby Ave. and Farragut St.	13.98 acres (5.66 ha)	Acquired in 1940, Farragut Park includes a basketball court, a playground, restroom, paved paths, picnic tables, and softball field. The park is named after David Farragut, an admiral who fought for the North in the Civil War and became famous for saying, "Damn the torpedoes! Full speed ahead!"
Gammans Park	The sign for Gammans Park, with a new carousel under construction in the background	N Buffalo St. and Burrage Ave.	1.66 acres (0.67 ha)	Acquired in 1910, Gammans Park includes paths and a playground with a racetrack for tricycles "complete with tunnels, bridges, and miniature highways with white lines down the middle". It was named after George G. Gammans, a Portland lawyer whose wife Laura gave the city six lots for a park to memorialize him.
George Park	George Park	N Burr Ave. and Fessenden St.	2.03 acres (0.82 ha)	Acquired in 1971, George Park includes paths and an accessible playground. The park is named for Melvin Clark George, a state senator, U.S. Congressman, and State circuit court judge.
Kelley Point Park		N Marine Dr. and Lombard St.	104.69 acres (42.37 ha)	Acquired in 1984, Kelley Point Park includes a canoe launch, hiking, picnic areas, and a view of the confluence of the Columbia and Willamette Rivers. The park is named for Hall Jackson Kelley, a promoter of settlement in the Pacific Northwest whose unsuccessful attempt to establish a city at this point was commemorated in 1926 by naming the location Kelley Point.
Kenton Park	Kenton Park	8417 N Brandon Ave.	12.40 acres (5.02 ha)	Acquired in 1941, Kenton Park includes a basketball court, restroom, paved paths, picnic tables, playground, soccer field, softball field, and water play area.
Lillis–Albina Park	A kickball game at Lillis–Albina Park	N Flint Ave. and Russell St.	3.93 acres (1.59 ha)	Acquired in 1940, Lillis-Albina Park includes picnic tables, a playground, a soccer field, and a softball field. Originally named after the former city of Albina, its name was changed in 1947 to also honor Michael Edward Lillis, a well-liked neighborhood police officer and strong advocate for the park and for children in the area.
Lotus Isle Park	The marina at Lotus Isle Park	N Tomahawk Island Dr.	1.65 acres (0.67 ha)	Acquired in 1992, Lotus Isle Park features paved paths, picnic tables, and an accessible playground. The park is named after Lotus Isle, a 128 acres (52 ha) amusement park on Tomahawk Island that operated from 1930 to 1932.
Madrona Park	Madrona Park	N Greeley Ave. and Going Ct.	9.45 acres (3.82 ha)	Acquired in 1921, Madrona Park features a basketball court, an accessible playground, unpaved paths, and a natural area. The park is named after the heritage-designated Pacific Madrona tree located on Wygant Street on the east edge of the park.
McCoy Park	McCoy Park	N Trenton St. and Newman Ave.	3.82 acres (1.55 ha)	Acquired in 1940, McCoy Park features paved paths and picnic tables, along with a playground, soccer and softball fields, and a basketball court. The park is named after Bill McCoy, the first African American elected to the Oregon Legislature, and his wife Gladys McCoy, who served on the Portland School Board and the Multnomah County Commission.
McKenna Park		N Wall Ave. and Princeton St.	4.52 acres (1.83 ha)	
Mocks Crest Park		2206 N Skidmore St.	5.86 acres (2.37 ha)	Mocks Crest Park, also known as the Skidmore Bluffs, was acquired in 1998 and is found on a 7-mile stretch of bluffs that runs along the east side of the Willamette River from Pier Park to the Fremont Bridge. The park overlooks Union Pacific's North Portland rail yard, the West Hills, and Portland's city skyline to the south.
Northgate Park		N Geneva Ave. and Fessenden St.	10.87 acres (4.40 ha)	Northgate Park, acquired in 1940, features a baseball field, restroom, playground, soccer field, softball field, tennis court, and water play area, along with paved paths and picnic tables.
Overlook Park		N Fremont St. and Interstate Ave.	11.30 acres (4.57 ha)	
Patton Square Park	Patton Square Park	N Interstate Ave. and Emerson St.	1.26 acres (0.51 ha)	Patton Square Park, named after pioneer and Portland landowner Matthew Patton, was acquired in 1960 and features paved paths, picnic tables, and a playground area.
Peninsula Crossing Trail		N Willamette Blvd. to Columbia Blvd.	9.07 acres (3.67 ha)	Peninsula Crossing Trail connects N Willamette Blvd to Columbia Blvd. Acquired in 1996, this multi-use paved path is 5.1 miles long and is wheel-chair accessible.
Peninsula Park and Rose Garden	Peninsula Park & Rose Garden	700 N Rosa Parks Way	16.34 acres (6.61 ha)	Acquired in 1909, Peninsula Park includes basketball and tennis courts, soccer and softball fields, a playground, covered picnic tables, the city's first public rose garden, and a 100-year-old fountain.
Pier Park		N Lombard St. and Bruce Ave.	85.00 acres (34.40 ha)	Acquired in 1920.
Portsmouth Park	Portsmouth Park	N Stanford Ave. and Depauw St.	4.03 acres (1.63 ha)	Portsmouth Park, acquired in 1941, offers a playground, soccer field, and softball field.
Smith and Bybee Wetlands Natural Area		5300 N Marine Drive	205.71 acres (83.25 ha)	
St. Johns Park		8427 N Central St.	5.87 acres (2.38 ha)	
Sumner–Albina Park		5134–5138 N Albina St	0.08 acres (0.032 ha)	Sumner–Albina Park was acquired in 1998 and features paved paths.
Trenton Park	alt Trenton Park	N Hamlin Ave. and Trenton St.	2.3 acres (0.93 ha)	Acquired in 1941, Trenton Park includes a basketball court, picnic tables, and playground.
University Park	University Park	9009 N Foss Ave.	11.49 acres (4.65 ha)	University Park, acquired in 1953, is not named for its close proximity to the University of Portland, but for its once close proximity to Portland University, a Methodist college during the 1890s. The park features a playground, soccer field, softball field, paved paths, picnic tables, and public art.
Unthank Park	Unthank Park	510 N Shaver St.	4.56 acres (1.85 ha)	Unthank Park was acquired in 1966 and named for Portland doctor DeNorval Unthank.

=== Northeast Portland ===
Name	Image	Location	Size	Description
Alberta Park	Alberta Park	NE 22nd Ave. and Killingsworth St.	16.40 acres (6.64 ha)	Acquired in 1921, Alberta Park includes a basketball court, dog off-leash area, playground, soccer field, softball field and tennis court, as well as paved and unpaved paths and picnic tables. The park is maintained by a volunteer group known as Friends of Alberta Park.
Argay Park		NE 141st Ave. and Failing St.	8.93 acres (3.61 ha)	Argay Park, adopted by the Argay Neighborhood Association, offers a basketball court, dog off-leash area, playground, soccer field and softball field, along with paved and unpaved paths, picnic tables, and tennis courts. The park was acquired in 1984.
Buckman Field		NE 12th Ave. and Everett St.	11.48 acres (4.65 ha)	Buckman Field, acquired in 1920, features a baseball field, football field, playground, soccer field, softball field and track, along with paved and unpaved paths and picnic tables.
Columbia Children's Arboretum		10040 NE 6th Ave.	27.18 acres (11.00 ha)	
East Holladay Park		12999 NE Holladay St.	5.73 acres (2.32 ha)	East Holladay Park was acquired in 1993 and includes a dog off-leash area.
Fernhill Park	Fernhill Park	NE 37th Ave. and Ainsworth St.	26.71 acres (10.81 ha)	
Frazer Park	The sun shining through a tree at Frazer Park	NE 52nd Ave. and Hassalo St.	3.81 acres (1.54 ha)	Acquired in 1950, Frazer Park was once the site of the Frazer Detention Home for the Juvenile Court. The building's cement floor is now used as a play court. The park also features a basketball court, dog off-leash area, picnic tables, and playground.
Glenfair Park	Glenfair Park	NE 154th Ave. and Davis St.	4.74 acres (1.92 ha)	Acquired in 1989, Glenhaven Park has been adopted by the Glenfair Neighborhood Association and includes a soccer field and softball field.
Glenhaven Park	Glenhaven Park	NE 82nd Ave. and Siskiyou St.	14.39 acres (5.82 ha)	
Grant Park		NE 33rd Ave. and US Grant Pl.	19.9 acres (8.1 ha)	
Hancock Park		NE 90th Ave. and Tillamook St.	3.60 acres (1.46 ha)	Hancock Park, acquired in 1941, has been adopted by the Hancock Madison Group Watch and features a playground and picnic tables.
Holladay Park		NE 11th Ave. and Holladay St.	4.54 acres (1.84 ha)	
Irving Park		NE 7th Ave. and Fremont St.	16.08 acres (6.51 ha)	
John Luby Park		NE 128th Ave. and Brazee St.	10.42 acres (4.22 ha)	
Joseph Wood Hill Park	Joseph Wood Hill Park	NE Rocky Butte Rd.	2.42 acres (0.98 ha)	
Kʰunamokwst Park	Kʰunamokwst Park	NE 52nd Ave. and Alberta St.	2.43 acres (0.98 ha)	Acquired in 2009; name means "together" in Chinook Jargon.
King School Park		NE 6th Ave. and Humboldt St.	2.64 acres (1.07 ha)	
Knott Park	Knott Park sign	NE 117th Ave. and Knott St.	12.74 acres (5.16 ha)	
Luuwit View Park		NE Fremont St.	15.82 acres (6.40 ha)	Acquired in 1984, it opened as Luuwit View Park in 2017. It features views of Luuwit (the Cowlitz name for Mt. St. Helens), a basketball court, soccer field, accessible playground and picnic areas, community gardens, a dog park, and foot and bike paths.
Mallory Meadows Park	Tiles of children's artwork covering a low wall in Mallory Meadows Park	NE Killingsworth St. and Mallory St.	0.15 acres (0.061 ha)	
Merrifield Park	Merrifield Park sign	NE 117th Ave. and Thompson St.	0.95 acres (0.38 ha)	
Montavilla Park		NE 82nd Ave. and Glisan St.	9.48 acres (3.84 ha)	
Normandale Park		NE 57th Ave. and Halsey St.	13.69 acres (5.54 ha)	
Oregon Park		NE 30th Ave. and Oregon St.	3.29 acres (1.33 ha)	
Rocky Butte Natural Area		NE Rocky Butte Rd.	19.64 acres (7.95 ha)	
Rose City Park		NE 62nd Ave. and Tillamook St.	24.00 acres (9.71 ha)	
Roselawn Park	Roselawn Park	1236 NE Roselawn St.	0.12 acres (0.049 ha)	Acquired in 1996, Roselawn Park consists of paved paths.
Rosemont Bluff Natural Area	Portland Parks & Recreation sign for Rosemont Bluff Natural Area	NE 68th Ave. and Hassalo St.	2.31 acres (0.93 ha)	Acquired in 1995, this hillside natural area includes a mixed evergreen deciduous forest and a short, unpaved trail.
Sacajawea Park	Sacajawea Park sign	NE 75th and Roselawn St.	4.86 acres (1.97 ha)	
Senn's Dairy Park		11206 NE Prescott St.	1.06 acres (0.43 ha)	
Thompson Park	Thompson Park sign	NE 138th Ave. and Thompson St.	4.42 acres (1.79 ha)	
Two Plum Park		NE 7th Ave. between Shaver St. and Mason St.	0.34 acres (0.14 ha)	
Wellington Park	Wellington Park sign	NE 66th Ave. and Mason St.	3.97 acres (1.61 ha)	
Whitaker Ponds Nature Park	The sign for Whitaker Ponds Nature Park	7040 NE 47th Ave.	25.76 acres (10.42 ha)	
Wilkes Park		3655 NE 154th Ave.	1.88 acres (0.76 ha)	
Wilshire Park	Wilshire Park	NE 33rd Ave. and Skidmore St.	14.30 acres (5.79 ha)	
Woodlawn Park	Woodlawn Park	NE 13th Ave. and Dekum St.	8.23 acres (3.33 ha)	

=== Northwest Portland ===
Name	Image	Location	Size	Description
Clark and Wilson Park		NW Germantown Rd.	17.23 acres (6.97 ha)	
Couch Park		NW 19th Ave. and Glisan St.	2.40 acres (0.97 ha)	
The Fields Park		NW Overton St. and NW 11th Ave.	3.2 acres (1.3 ha)	
Forest Heights Park	Playground at Forest Heights Park	2999 NW Miller Rd.	2.93 acres (1.19 ha)	
Forest Park	An unpaved path about 2 feet (0.6 meters) wide runs through a forest with a thick understory of ferns.	Tualatin Mountains (West Hills) (NW 29th Ave. and Upshur St. to Newberry Rd.)	5,172.14 acres (2,093.09 ha)	
Hillside Park		653 NW Culpepper Terr.	3.41 acres (1.38 ha)	
Holman Park		NW Mountain View Park Rd.		
Jamison Square		Pearl District (810 NW 11th Ave.)	0.94 acres (0.38 ha)	
Kingsley Park		NW St. Helens Rd.	1.14 acres (0.46 ha)	
Lan Su Chinese Garden	Lake Zither in Lan Su Chinese Garden	239 NW Everett St.	1.03 acres (0.42 ha)	
Linnton Park		NW 105th Ave. and St. Helens Rd.		
Macleay Park	Stone structure where the Wildwood Trail meets the Lower Macleay Trail along Balch Creek in Macleay Park	NW 29th Ave. and Upshur St.		
North Park Blocks	North Park Blocks	Downtown Portland (NW Park Ave. from Ankeny St. to Glisan St.)	3.11 acres (1.26 ha)	
Pittock Mansion Acres	A large house of many windows with white panes, and with a red-checkered roof with many steep sides	3229 NW Pittock Dr.	54.94 acres (22.23 ha)	Acquired in 1964, this park includes the French Renaissance-style Pittock Mansion, listed on the National Register of Historic Places.
Portland Firefighters Park		NW 18th Ave. and Burnside St.		Consisting of a stone memorial and small triangular park, Firefighters Park is dedicated to David Campbell, a former Portland fire chief who died in 1911.
Tanner Springs Park		Pearl District; NW 10th Ave. and Marshall St.	0.92 acres (0.37 ha)	
Tom McCall Waterfront Park		Downtown Portland (Naito Pkwy. between SW Harrison St. and NW Glisan St.)	30.90 acres (12.50 ha)	Acquired in 1927, Tom McCall Waterfront Park features riverfront views, public art, statues, fountains, boat docks, and a large plaza lined with 100 ornamental cherry trees. The park was completed in 1978 after the removal of Harbor Drive.
Wallace Park		NW 25th Ave. and Raleigh St.	5.38 acres (2.18 ha)	

=== Southeast Portland ===
Name	Image	Location	Size	Description
Ardenwald Park		SE Roswell St. and 36th Ave	1 acre (0.40 ha)	Located in the Ardenwald-Johnson Creek neighborhood
Berkeley Park		SE Cesar Chavez Blvd. and Bybee Blvd.	6.48 acres (2.62 ha)	
Berrydale Park		SE 92nd Ave. and Taylor St.	6.31 acres (2.55 ha)	
Bloomington Park	Bloomington Park sign	SE 100th Ave. and Steele St.	12.87 acres (5.21 ha)	
Brentwood Park	Brentwood Park	SE 60th Ave. and Duke St.	14.06 acres (5.69 ha)	
Brooklyn Park		SE 10th Ave. and Haig St.	2.39 acres (0.97 ha)	
Brooklyn School Park		SE 15th Ave. and Bush St.	3.59 acres (1.45 ha)	
Cherry Blossom Park		SE 98th Ave. and Stephens St.	0.96 acres (0.39 ha)	
Cherry Park	Cherry Park sign	SE 110th Ave. and Stephens St.	10.23 acres (4.14 ha)	
Clatsop Butte Park		SE 152nd Ave. and Belmore St.	44.41 acres (17.97 ha)	
Clinton Park		SE 55th Ave. and Woodward St.	12.14 acres (4.91 ha)	
Colonel Summers Park		SE 17th Ave. and Taylor St.	5.99 acres (2.42 ha)	
Creston Park		SE 44th Ave. and Powell Blvd.	14.38 acres (5.82 ha)	
Crystal Springs Rhododendron Garden		SE 28th Ave. and Woodstock Blvd.	9.49 acres (3.84 ha)	
Earl Boyles Park	Earl Boyles Park	SE 112th Ave. and Boise St.	7.84 acres (3.17 ha)	
Eastbank Esplanade		SE Water Ave. and Hawthorne Blvd.	10.69 acres (4.33 ha)	Acquired in 1998, the Eastbank Esplanade features riverfront views of Downtown Portland, a public boat dock, paved paths, hiking and biking trails, and a 1,200 foot floating walkway on the Willamette River.
Eastmoreland Garden		2425 SE Bybee Blvd.	0.41 acres (0.17 ha)	
Eastmoreland Playground Park		SE 30th Ave. and Crystal Springs Blvd.	—	
Eastridge Park		SE 141st Ave. and Crystal Springs St.	3.50 acres (1.42 ha)	
Ed Benedict Park	Ed Benedict Park	SE 100th Ave. and Powell Blvd.	12.70 acres (5.14 ha)	
Elk Rock Island	Elk Rock Island	SE 19th Ave. and Sparrow St.	13.24 acres (5.36 ha)	
Errol Heights Park	The edge of Errol Heights Park, next to a road	SE 52nd Avenue and Tenino Street	16.31 acres (6.60 ha)	
Essex Park	Essex Park	SE 79th Ave. and Center St.	4.43 acres (1.79 ha)	
Flavel Park	Flavel Park	SE 75th Ave. and Flavel St.	4.20 acres (1.70 ha)	
Floyd Light Park		SE 111th Ave. and Alder St.	7.65 acres (3.10 ha)	
Gilbert Heights Park		SE 130th Ave. and Boise St.	3.81 acres (1.54 ha)	
Gilbert Primary Park		SE 134th Ave. and Foster Rd.	4.39 acres (1.78 ha)	
Glenwood Park	Glenwood Park	SE 87th Ave. and Claybourne St.	7.30 acres (2.95 ha)	
Harney Park		SE 67th Ave. and Harney St.	6.50 acres (2.63 ha)	
Harrison Park		SE 84th Ave. and Harrison St.	4.63 acres (1.87 ha)	
Hazeltine Park		5416 SE Flavel Dr.	1.02 acres (0.41 ha)	
Johnson Creek Park		SE 21st Ave. and Clatsop St.	4.52 acres (1.83 ha)	
Kelly Butte Natural Area	The entrance to Kelly Butte	SE 103rd Ave. and Clinton St.	23.34 acres (9.45 ha)	
Kenilworth Park		SE 34th Ave. and Holgate Blvd.	8.40 acres (3.40 ha)	
Kern Park		SE 67th Ave. and Center St.	1.62 acres (0.66 ha)	
Ladd Circle Park and Rose Gardens		SE 16th Ave. and Harrison St.	1.62 acres (0.66 ha)	
Laurelhurst Park		SE Cesar Chavez Blvd. and Stark St.	32.27 acres (13.06 ha)	Acquired in 1909, Laurelhurst Park includes basketball, tennis, and volleyball courts, a soccer field, a playground, picnic tables, paved and unpaved paths, a dog off-leash area, and a 3-acre spring-fed lake. The land was originally part of a cattle farm owned by early Portland mayor William S. Ladd. It was named to the National Register of Historic Places in 2001.
Laurelwood Park	Laurelwood Park	SE 64th St. and Foster Rd.	0.42 acres (0.17 ha)	Laurelwood Park was acquired in 1923.
Leach Botanical Garden		6704 SE 122nd Ave.	17.35 acres (7.02 ha)	
Lents Park	Lents Park	SE 92nd Ave. and Holgate Blvd.	38.07 acres (15.41 ha)	
Lincoln Park	Lincoln Park sign	SE 135th Ave. and Mill St.	7.06 acres (2.86 ha)	Lincoln Park was acquired in 1993.
Lynchwood Park		SE 170th Ave. and Haig St.	8.45 acres (3.42 ha)	
Midland Park		SE 122nd Ave. and Morrison St.	1.90 acres (0.77 ha)	
Mill Park	Mill Park sign	SE 117th Ave. and Mill Ct.	5.7 acres (2.3 ha)	
Mt. Scott Park	Mt. Scott Park	SE 72nd Ave. and Harold St.	11.22 acres (4.54 ha)	
Mt. Tabor Park	Mt. Tabor Park	SE 60th Ave. and Salmon St.	176.04 acres (71.24 ha)	Acquired in 1909, Mt. Tabor Park encompasses a volcanic cindercone in Southeast Portland. The park features basketball, tennis, and volleyball courts, a playground, picnic tables, a dog off-leash area, extensive paved and unpaved trails, and several open reservoirs which predate the construction of the park.
North Powellhurst Park	North Powellhurst Park sign	SE 135th Ave. and Main St.	3.9 acres (1.6 ha)	
Oaks Bottom Wildlife Refuge		SE 7th Ave. and Sellwood Blvd.	161.58 acres (65.39 ha)	
Oaks Pioneer Church and Park		455 SE Spokane St.	1.31 acres (0.53 ha)	
Parklane Park	Parklane Park sign	SE 155th Ave. and Main St.	25.6 acres (10.4 ha)	
Piccolo Park		SE 27th Ave. and Division St.	0.57 acres (0.23 ha)	
PlayHaven Park		SE 107th Ave. and Henderson St.	3.15 acres (1.27 ha)	
Portland Memory Garden	Portland Memory Garden	SE 104th Ave. and Powell Blvd.		The Portland Memory Garden opened in May 2002.
Powell Butte Nature Park	Powell Butte	16160 SE Powell Blvd.	603.04 acres (244.04 ha)	
Powell Park	Powell Park	SE 26th Ave. and Powell Blvd.	8.09 acres (3.27 ha)	
Raymond Park	Raymond Park	SE 118th Ave. and Raymond St.	6.11 acres (2.47 ha)	
Verdell Burdine Rutherford Park	Verdell Burdine Rutherford Park	SE 167th Ave and Market St.	7.7 acres (3.1 ha)	Formerly known as Lynchview Park.
Sellwood Park	Flowers at Sellwood Park	SE 7th Ave. and Miller St.	16.65 acres (6.74 ha)	Named for pioneer John Sellwood, Sellwood Park was acquired in 1909.
Sellwood Riverfront Park		SE Spokane St. and Oaks Pkwy.	8.17 acres (3.31 ha)	
Sewallcrest Park		SE 31st Ave. and Market St.	4.92 acres (1.99 ha)	
Springwater Corridor		SE Ivon St. to Boring, Oregon	261.64 acres (105.88 ha)	
Stark Street Island	Stark Street Island	SE 106th Ave. and Stark St.	0.41 acres (0.17 ha)	Stark Street Island was acquired in 1986.
Sunnyside School Park		SE 34th Ave. and Taylor St.	1.65 acres (0.67 ha)	
Tideman Johnson Natural Area		SE 37th Ave. and Tenino St.	7.59 acres (3.07 ha)	
Ventura Park	Ventura Park	SE 115th Ave. and Stark St.	7.18 acres (2.91 ha)	Acquired in 1986, Ventura Park's features include a playground, a bicycle pump track and a soccer field.
West Powellhurst Park		SE 115th Ave. and Division St.	3.68 acres (1.49 ha)	
Westmoreland Park		SE McLoughlin Blvd. and Bybee Blvd.	43.09 acres (17.44 ha)	
Woodstock Park	Woodstock Park	SE 47th Ave. and Steele St.	14.11 acres (5.71 ha)	

=== Southwest Portland ===
Name	Image	Location	Size	Description
Albert Kelly Park		SW Dosch Rd. and Mitchell St.	12.09 acres (4.89 ha)	
April Hill Park		SW 58th Ave. and Miles St.	10.12 acres (4.10 ha)	
Arnold Creek Natural Area		SW 11th Dr. and Arnold St.	0.48 acres (0.19 ha)	
Ash Creek Natural Area		SW 53rd Ave. and Dickinson St.	5.15 acres (2.08 ha)	
Burlingame Park		SW 12th Ave. and Falcon St.	4.67 acres (1.89 ha)	
Cottonwood Bay	Flowers next to Cottonwood Bay	SW Hamilton Ct.	0.83 acres (0.34 ha)	
Council Crest Park		SW Council Crest Dr.	42.95 acres (17.38 ha)	
DeWitt Park	DeWitt Park	1805 SW DeWitt St.	0.64 acres (0.26 ha)	
Dickinson Park		SW 55th Ave. and Alfred Ct.	18.66 acres (7.55 ha)	
Director Park		Downtown Portland (815 SW Park Ave.)	0.71 acres (0.29 ha)	
Duniway Park		SW 6th Ave. and Sheridan St.	14.03 acres (5.68 ha)	
Fanno Creek Natural Area		SW 59th Ave. and Hamilton St.	7.37 acres (2.98 ha)	
Foley–Balmer Natural Area		9520 SW Lancaster Rd.	9.64 acres (3.90 ha)	
Fulton Park		68 SW Miles St.	8.50 acres (3.44 ha)	
Gabriel Park		SW 45th Ave. and Vermont St.	89.67 acres (36.29 ha)	
George Himes Park		SW Terwilliger Blvd. and Slavin Rd.	35.97 acres (14.56 ha)	
Governor's Park		SW 13th Ave. and Davenport St.	5.74 acres (2.32 ha)	
Hamilton Park		SW 45th Ave. and Hamilton St.	10.49 acres (4.25 ha)	
Healy Heights Park		SW Patrick Pl. and Council Crest Dr.	1.18 acres (0.48 ha)	
Heritage Tree Park	The Corbett Oak at Heritage Tree Park	SW Corbett Ave. and Lane St.	0.09 acres (0.036 ha)	Acquired in 1997, Heritage Tree Park has the Corbett Oak, an oak tree twice rescued from being cut down.
Hillsdale Park		SW 27th Ave. and Hillsdale Hwy.	5.17 acres (2.09 ha)	
Holly Farm Park	The skating area at Holly Farm Park	10819 SW Capitol Hwy.	1.70 acres (0.69 ha)	
Hoyt Arboretum		4000 SW Fairview Blvd.	153.01 acres (61.92 ha)	
International Rose Test Garden		400 SW Kingston Ave.	6.90 acres (2.79 ha)	
Jensen Natural Area		SW 18th Pl. north of Broadleaf Dr.	2.24 acres (0.91 ha)	
Keller Fountain Park		Downtown Portland (SW 3rd Ave. and Clay St.)	0.92 acres (0.37 ha)	
Lair Hill Park		SW 2nd Ave. and Woods St.	3.26 acres (1.32 ha)	
Lesser Park		SW 57th Ave. and Haines St.	8.4 acres (3.4 ha)	
Lovejoy Fountain Park	Lovejoy Fountain Park	SW 3rd Avenue and Harrison Street	1.11 acres (0.45 ha)	
Maricara Natural Area		10608 SW 30th Ave.	17.25 acres (6.98 ha)	
Marquam Nature Park	The forest in Marquam Nature Park	SW Marquam St. and Sam Jackson Park Rd.	204.87 acres (82.91 ha)	
Marshall Park		9700 SW 12th Dr	26.16 acres (10.59 ha)	
Mill Ends Park		Downtown Portland (SW Naito Pkwy. and Taylor St.)	452 square inches (2,920 cm^{2})	
Darcelle XV Plaza (formerly O'Bryant Square)		Downtown Portland (SW Park Ave. and Washington St.)	0.46 acres (0.19 ha)	
Pendleton Park		SW 55th Ave. and Iowa St.	5.21 acres (2.11 ha)	
Pettygrove Park	Pettygrove Park	SW 1st to 4th Ave—Market to Harrison St	1.17 acres (0.47 ha)	Pettygrove Park was acquired in 1966.
Plaza Blocks		Downtown Portland	—	Acquired in 1869, the Plaza Blocks consist of two courthouse squares, Chapman Square and Lownsdale Square, named for William W. Chapman and Daniel H. Lownsdale respectively.
Portland Heights Park		SW Patton Rd. and Old Orchard Rd.	5.08 acres (2.06 ha)	
Portland Japanese Garden		SW Kingston Dr.	—	
Powers Marine Park		SW Macadam Ave. south of the Sellwood Bridge	13.97 acres (5.65 ha)	
Scht Wiwnu Park		SW 21st Ave. and Capitol Hill Rd.	6.33 acres (2.56 ha)	Scht Wiwnu Park was formerly named Custer Park. It was renamed from "A Park" to Scht Wiwnu Park in March 2026. In December 2020, City Commissioner Amanda Fritz gave the park the placeholder name "A Park" by issuing an executive order.
South Park Blocks		Downtown Portland	8.73 acres (3.53 ha)	
Spring Garden Park		3332 SW Spring Garden St.	4.56 acres (1.85 ha)	
Stephens Creek Nature Park		SW Bertha Blvd. and Chestnut St.	4.73 acres (1.91 ha)	
Sylvania Park		SW 53rd Ave. and Coronado St.	3.12 acres (1.26 ha)	
Terwilliger Parkway		SW 6th Ave. and Sheridan St. to Slavin St.	102.82 acres (41.61 ha)	
Tom McCall Waterfront Park		Naito Pkwy. between SW Harrison St. and NW Glisan St.	30.90 acres (12.50 ha)	
Tryon Creek State Natural Area		11321 S. Terwilliger Blvd.	645 acres (261 ha)	
Washington Park		Head of SW Park Place	241.45 acres (97.71 ha)	
West Portland Park Natural Area		SW 39th Ave. and Pomona St.	14.66 acres (5.93 ha)	
Woods Memorial Natural Area		SW 45th Ave. and Woods St.	45.98 acres (18.61 ha)	

=== South Portland ===
Name	Image	Location	Size	Description
Butterfly Park		7720 S Macadam Ave.	1.07 acres (0.43 ha)	
Caruthers Park		3508 S Moody Avenue	2.12 acres (0.86 ha)	Officially Elizabeth Caruthers Park, it is located in the South Waterfront district and includes a water fountain.
South Waterfront Park	River overlook at South Waterfront Park	S River Dr. and S Montgomery St.	4.52 acres (1.83 ha)	
Willamette Moorage Park		7720 S Macadam Ave.	17.24 acres (6.98 ha)	
Willamette Park		S Macadam Ave. and Nebraska St.	26.26 acres (10.63 ha)	

== Portland Water Bureau ==
The Portland Water Bureau operates various "HydroParks" on land that is owned by the bureau.

Name	Image	Location	Description
Gilbert HydroPark		13803 SE Center Street	Located in the Powellhurst-Gilbert neighborhood.
Halsey HydroPark		NE 148th and Halsey Street	Located in the Wilkes neighborhood. Includes a large sloping field in the middle of the park.
Hazelwood HydroPark		1017 NE 117th Ave	Located in the Hazelwood neighborhood. The East Portland Neighborhood Office is located on the corner, and a water conservation demonstration garden showcases water-efficient landscaping.
Sabin HydroPark		1907 NE Skidmore	Located in the Sabin neighborhood. In 2012, a micro hydro-turbine generator was installed at this site to convert the thrust of water into useful electrical energy at an estimated rate of 150,000 kilowatt hours per year. This electricity is used to help power area water facilities and excess electricity is sold back to PacifiCorp. The extra revenue is used to keep the overall cost of delivering water service to a minimum.
Pittman Addition HydroPark		North Concord and North Going Court	Located in the Overlook neighborhood.
Marigold HydroPark		8925 SW 15th Ave	Located in the Markham neighborhood.
Texas HydroPark		3109 SW Texas Street	Located in the Multnomah neighborhood.

== Metro ==
The Metro regional government operates 20 parks, 4 of which are located in Portland.

Name	Image	Location	Description
Broughton Beach		4356 NE Marine Drive	The park offers a sandy beach, Columbia River access for swimming and small watercraft, picnicking, beachcombing, restrooms. A parking fee applies.
Glendoveer Golf Course & Nature Trail		14015 NE Glisan Street	
Smith and Bybee Wetlands Natural Area		5300 N Marine Drive	
St. Johns Prairie		N City Dump Road	

== Oregon State Parks ==
Oregon Parks and Recreation Department, or Oregon State Parks, operates over 250 State parks. One of these is located in Portland.

Name	Image	Location	Description
Tryon Creek State Natural Area		11321 S. Terwilliger Blvd.	

== United States Federal Government ==
Name	Image	Location	Description
Terry Schrunk Plaza		431 SW Madison Street	

== See also ==
- Green Loop, an in-progress linear park
- Arleta Triangle, a pocket park
- List of community gardens in Portland, Oregon
- Lists of Oregon-related topics
- Tourism in Portland, Oregon
