= Mill Park =

Mill Park may refer to:

- Mill Park, Victoria, a suburb of Melbourne, Australia
- Mill Park, Portland, Oregon, a neighborhood in the United States
  - Mill Park (Portland, Oregon), a public park in the Portland, Oregon neighborhood of the same name
- Mill Park, Bathgate, a former association football venue in Scotland
- Mill Park station, a former railroad station on the Colebrookdale Railroad in Pennsylvania, United States

== See also ==
- Millpark Cricket Club, a former cricket team from Northern Ireland
- Milpark, an area of Johannesburg, South Africa
