= Mill Park, Portland, Oregon =

Mill Park
- Neighborhood
- Interactive map of Mill Park
- Coordinates: 45°30′38″N 122°32′16″W
- Country: United States
- State: Oregon
- City: Portland

Government
  - Association: Mill Park Neighborhood Association
  - Coalition: East Portland Neighborhood Office

Area
  - Total: 1.06 sq mi (2.74 km^{2})

Population (2000)
  - Total: 6,826
  - Density: 6,450/sq mi (2,490/km^{2})

Housing
  - No. of households: 2589
  - Occupancy rate: 95% occupied
  - Owner-occupied: 1524 households (59%)
  - Renting: 1065 households (41%)
  - Avg. household size: 2.64 persons

Mill Park is a neighborhood in the outer Southeast section of Portland, Oregon, United States. It borders Hazelwood on the west, north and east, and Powellhurst-Gilbert on the south.

In addition to the park of the same name (acquired 1986), the neighborhood includes Midland Park (1986), Stark Street Island (1986), and Floyd Light Park (1985). Portland Parks & Recreation also operates the East Portland Community Center in the neighborhood. Midland Library, servicing Multnomah County, is also located in Mill Park.

The neighborhood is home to Fir Ridge Campus, Floyd Light Middle School, and Mill Park Elementary in the David Douglas School District. It is also home to Portland Christian Elementary School.

Since 1996, the Mill Park neighborhood has been home to US Senator Jeff Merkley.
