= Marquam Nature Park =

Public park in Portland, Oregon, U.S.

Coordinates: 45.49°N 122.69°W

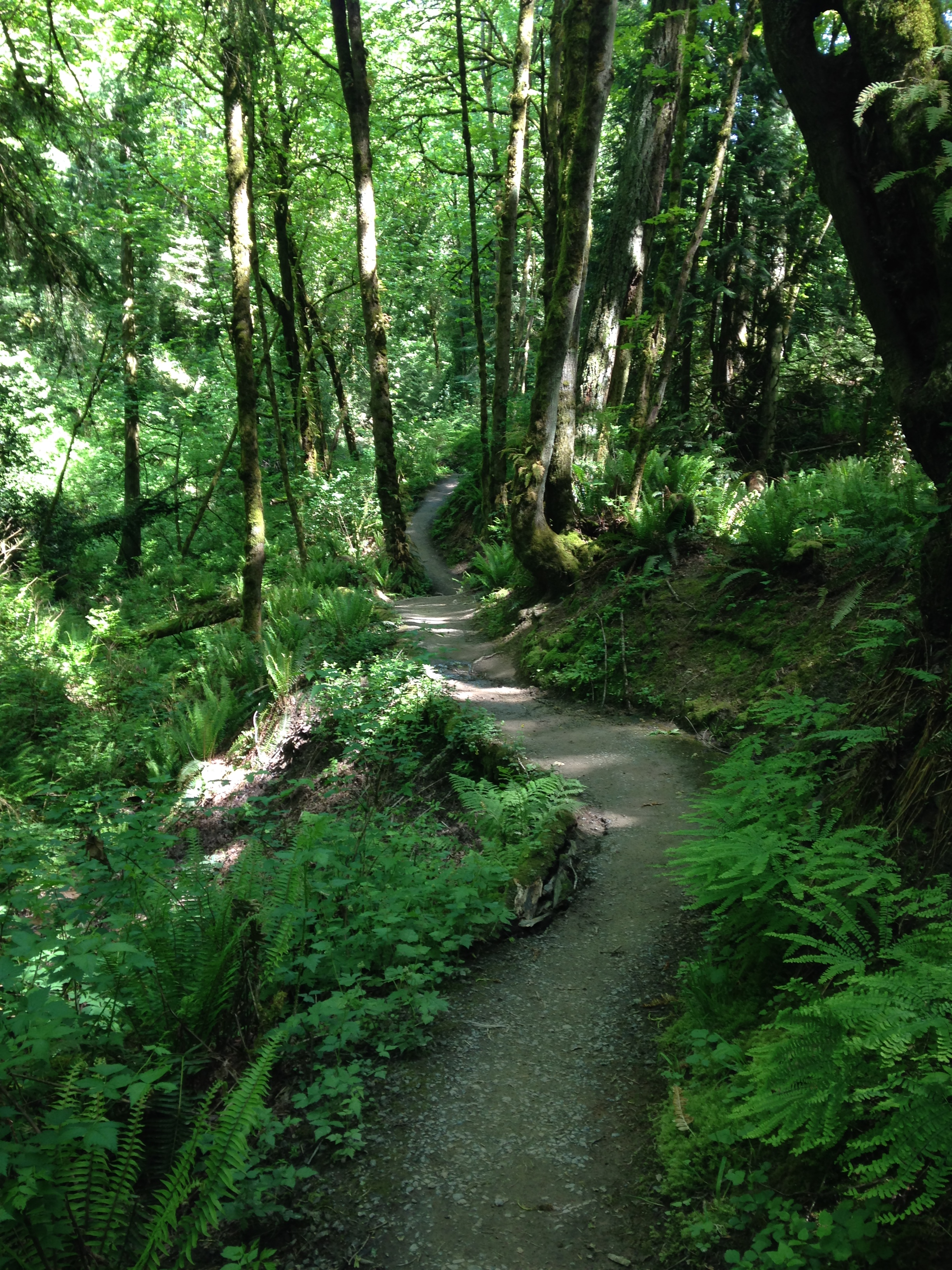
- Hiking trail
- Interactive map of Marquam Nature Park
- Location: SW Marquam St. and Sam Jackson Park Rd. Portland, Oregon
- Area: 204.87 acres (82.91 ha)
- Operator: Portland Parks & Recreation

Marquam Nature Park is a 203.5-acre (82.4 ha) park, located in the gulch northeast of Marquam hill in southwest Portland, Oregon, United States. The park was acquired by Portland Parks & Recreation in 1979. Marquam Nature Park is in Southwest Portland in the Tualatin Mountains, also known as the West Hills, and has several miles of hiking trails.

== Description and history ==
Marquam Nature Park includes part of the Marquam Trail, which connects to the 40-Mile Loop. The natural area includes many native plant species, including bigleaf maple, Douglas fir, red cedar, and western hemlock. The park's entrance features a shelter with interpretive displays and maps. The volunteer organization called Friends of Marquam Nature Park formed in 1968 after neighbors of the park successfully prevented housing development on Marquam Ravine.

In 2013, Friends of Marquam Nature Park and the Regional Arts & Culture Council funded a mosaic project for one of the shelter's walls. The project cost $17,600; assembly began in August, and the dedication took place on September 28, 2013 following its completion.

== See also ==
- List of parks in Portland, Oregon
