= Sewallcrest Park =

Public park in Portland, Oregon, U.S.

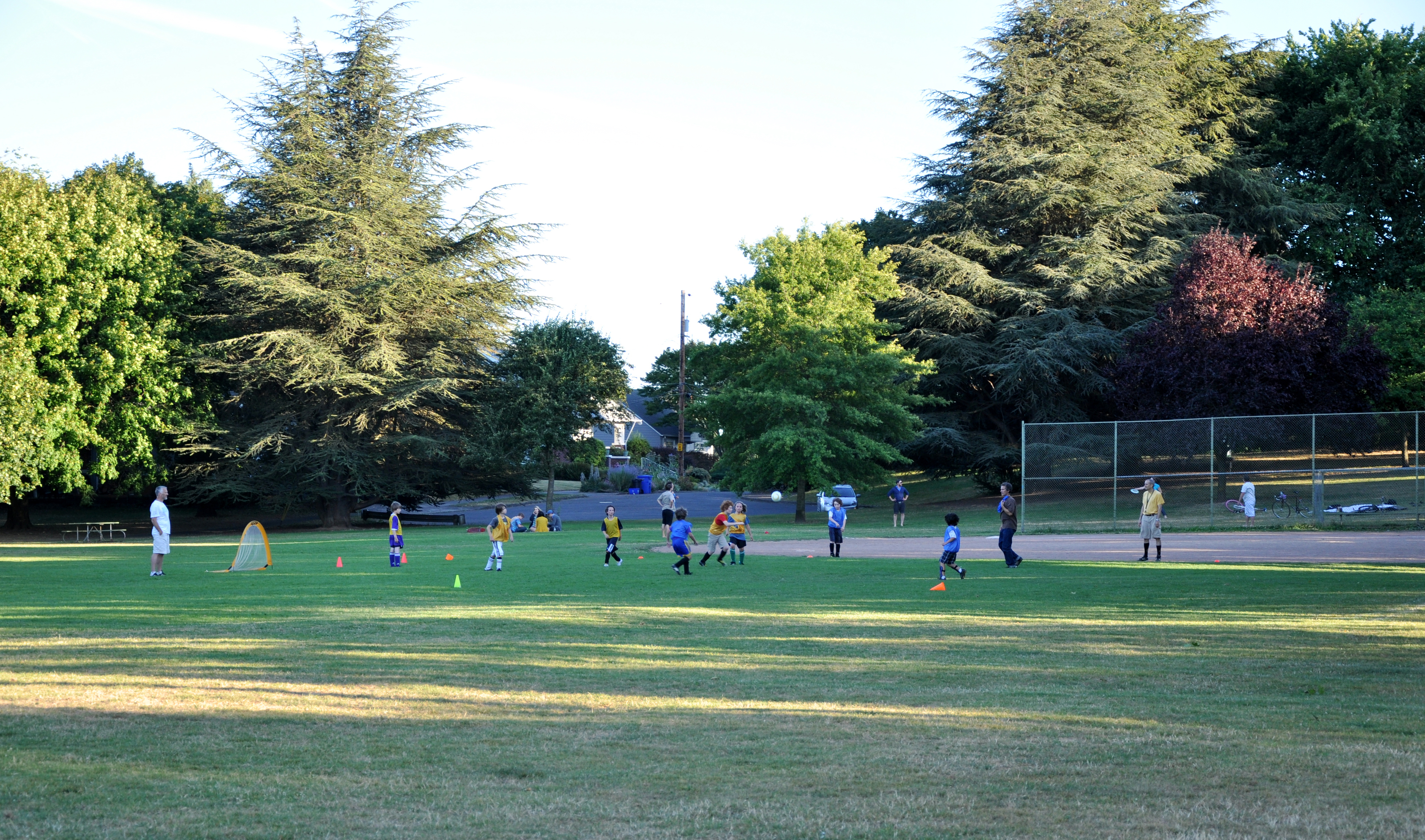
- Part of the park in 2010

- Location within Portland, Oregon
- Location: SE 31st Ave. and Market St. Portland, Oregon
- Coordinates: 45°30′34″N 122°37′58″W
- Area: 4.92 acres (1.99 ha)
- Operator: Portland Parks & Recreation

Sewallcrest Park is a public park in Portland, Oregon's Richmond neighborhood, in the United States. The 5.09-acre (2.06 ha) park was acquired in 1940.

== See also ==
- List of parks in Portland, Oregon
