= Fernhill Park =

Fernhill Park may refer to:

- Fernhill Park (Berkshire)
- Fernhill Park (Oregon)
