= Wilshire Park (Portland, Oregon) =

Public park in Portland, Oregon, U.S.

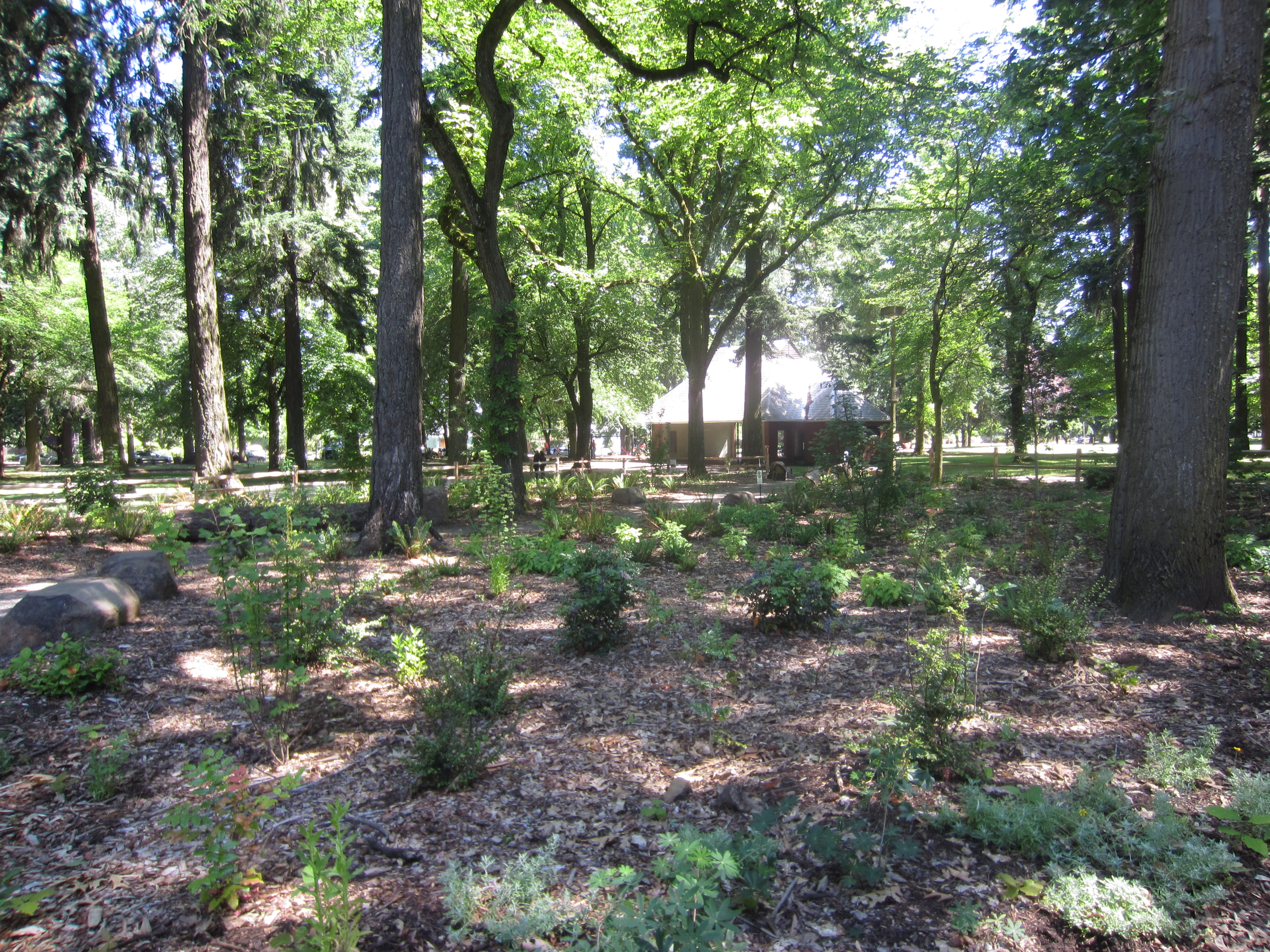
- The park in 2019

- Location within Portland, Oregon
- Location: NE 33rd Ave. and Skidmore St. Portland, Oregon
- Coordinates: 45°33′10″N 122°37′40″W
- Area: 14.30 acres (5.79 ha)
- Established: 1940
- Operator: Portland Parks & Recreation

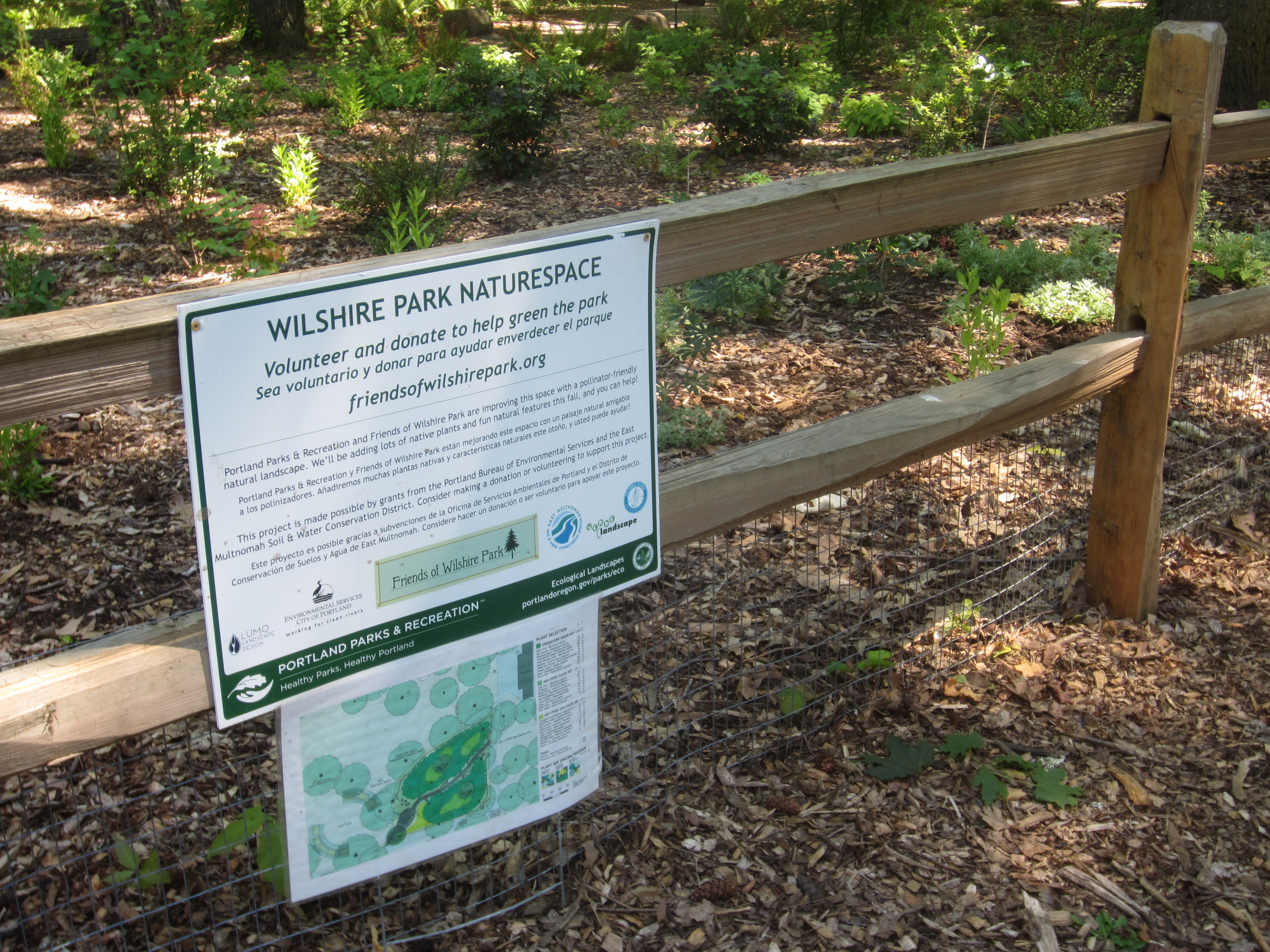
Signage for the naturespace, 2019

Wilshire Park is a 14.4-acre (5.8 ha) public park in northeast Portland, Oregon, United States. Situated within the Beaumont-Wilshire neighborhood, the park was acquired by the city in 1940, and is maintained by Portland Parks & Recreation. The park features a variety of facilities and uses including playgrounds, an off-leash dog park, baseball fields, picnic tables, and a 0.6 mile loop trail.

== See also ==
- List of parks in Portland, Oregon
