= Kenton Park =

Public park in Portland, Oregon, U.S.

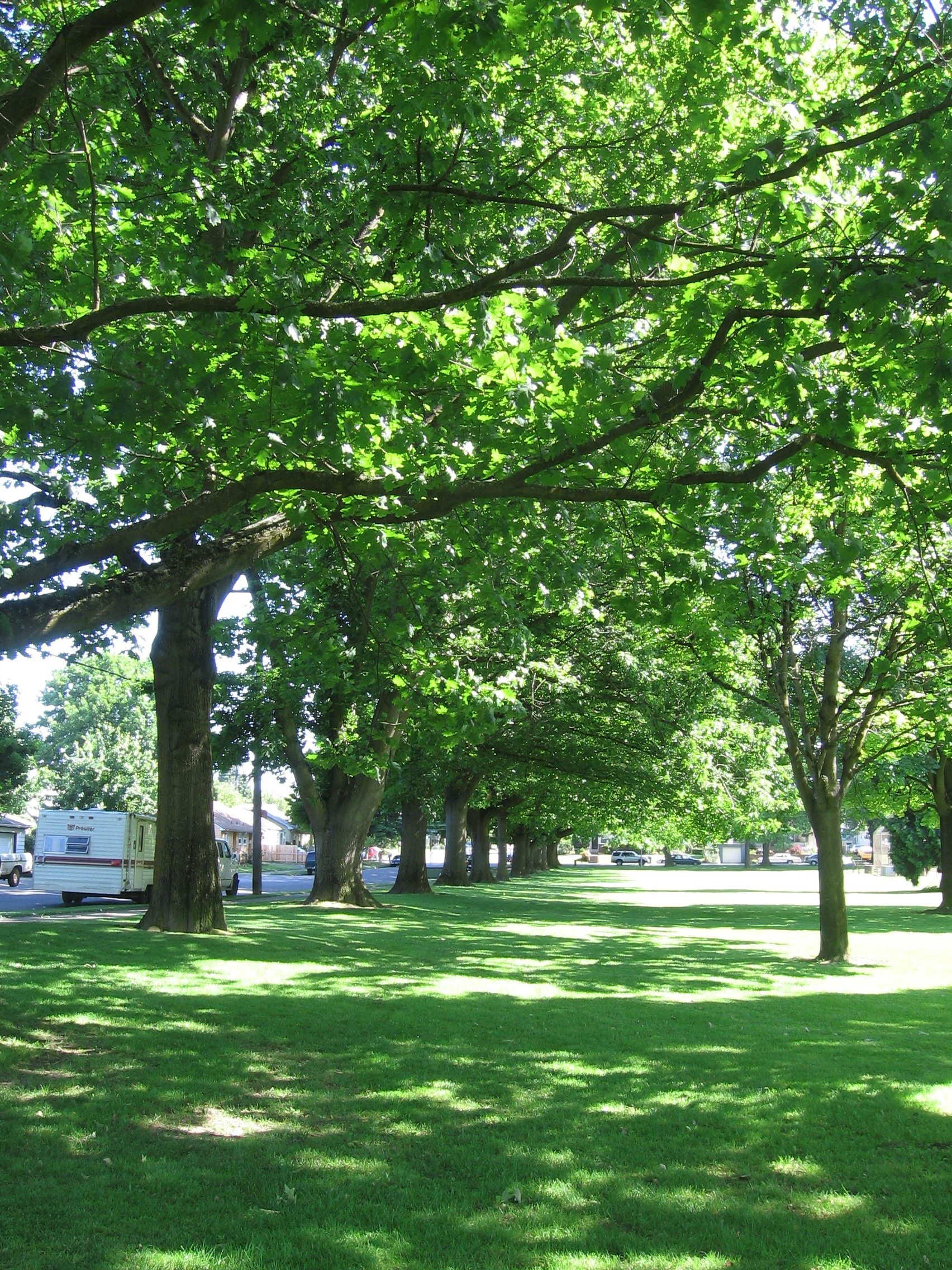
- The park in 2007

- Location within Portland, Oregon
- Location: 8417 North Brandon Avenue; Portland, Oregon
- Coordinates: 45.5834269°N 122.6906226°W
- Area: 12.40 acres (5.02 ha)
- Created: 1941
- Operator: Portland Parks & Recreation
- Public transit: Kenton/N Denver Ave

Kenton Park is a public park in north Portland, Oregon's Kenton neighborhood, in the United States. The 12.40-acre (5.02 ha) park was acquired in 1941. A new playground opened in 2018.

== See also ==
- List of parks in Portland, Oregon
