= South Waterfront Park =

Public park in Portland, Oregon, U.S.

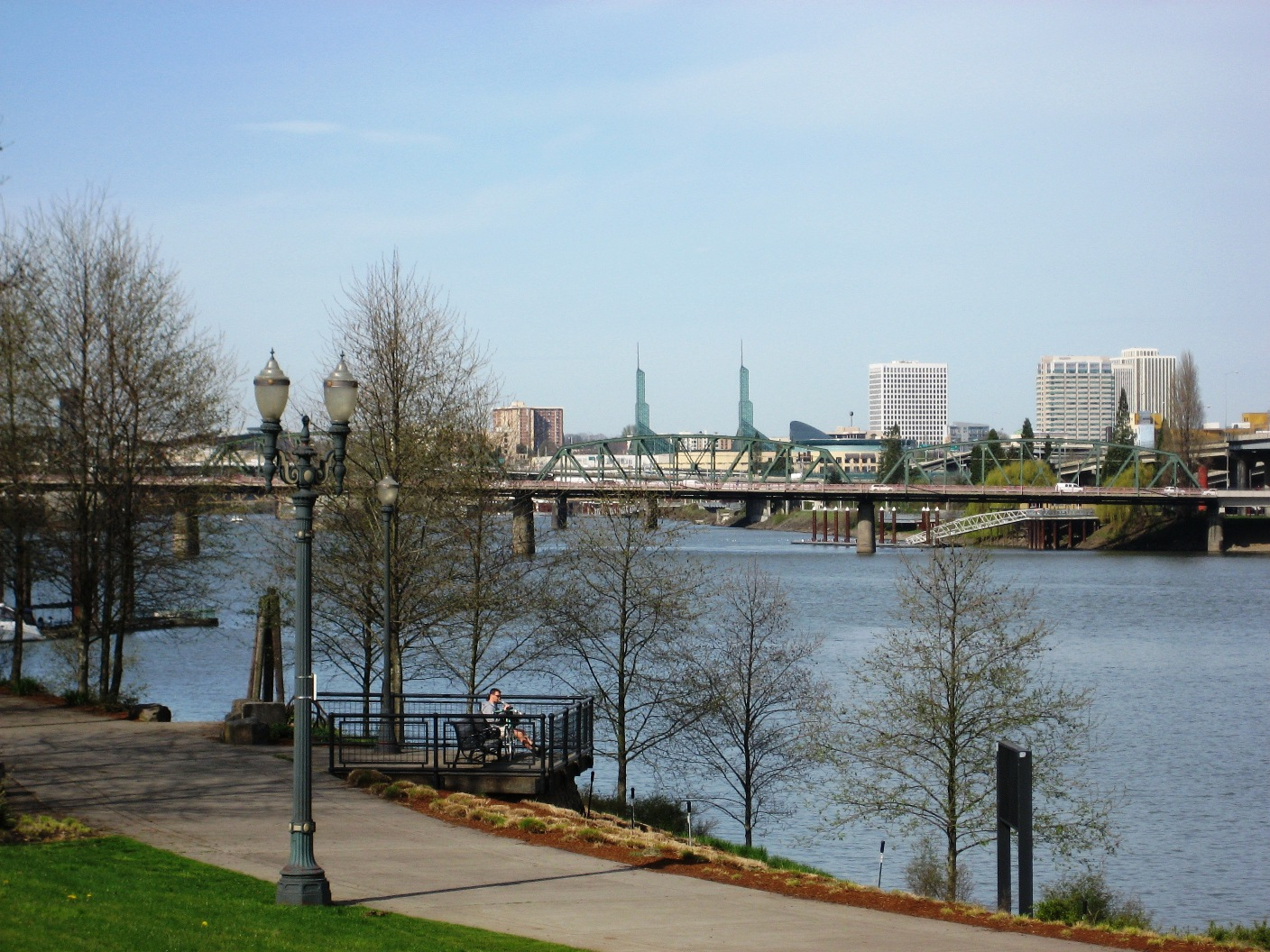
- Part of the park in 2007
- Interactive map of South Waterfront Park
- Location: S River Dr. and S Montgomery St. Portland, Oregon
- Coordinates: 45°30′26″N 122°40′18″W
- Area: 4.52 acres (1.83 ha)
- Established: 1999
- Operator: Portland Parks & Recreation
- Public transit: NS S River Pkwy and Moody; 96

South Waterfront Park is a 4.52-acre (1.83 ha) park in Portland, Oregon, United States. The park was acquired in 1999.

== See also ==
- List of parks in Portland, Oregon
