= Brooklyn Park (Portland, Oregon) =

Public park in Portland, Oregon, U.S.

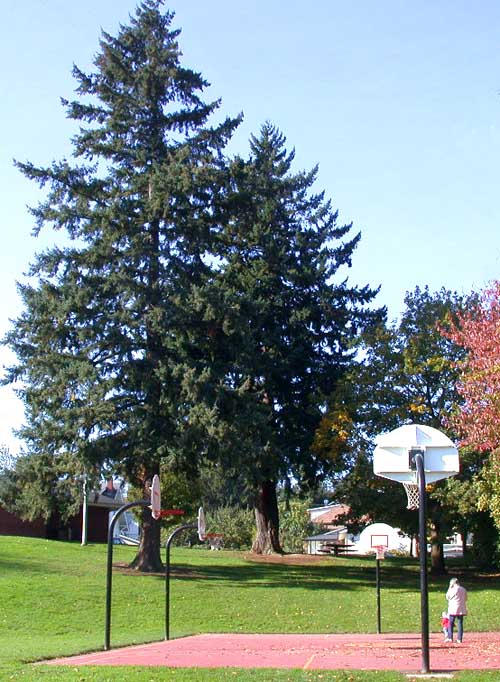
- The park's basketball court, 2004

- Location within Portland, Oregon
- Interactive map of Brooklyn Park
- Location: SE 10th Ave. and Haig St. Portland, Oregon
- Coordinates: 45.498536°N 122.655028°W
- Area: 2.39 acres (0.97 ha)
- Established: 1949
- Operator: Portland Parks & Recreation

Brooklyn Park is a 2.37-acre (0.96 ha) public park in the neighborhood of Brooklyn in Portland, Oregon, United States. The park was acquired in 1949.

Friends of Brooklyn Park sponsors the Brooklyn Park Summer Program, which has included a large water slide.

Marcia Donahue's sculpture Tête à Tête à Tête was installed in 1996.

== See also ==
- List of parks in Portland, Oregon
