= Oregon Park =

Public park in Portland, Oregon, U.S.

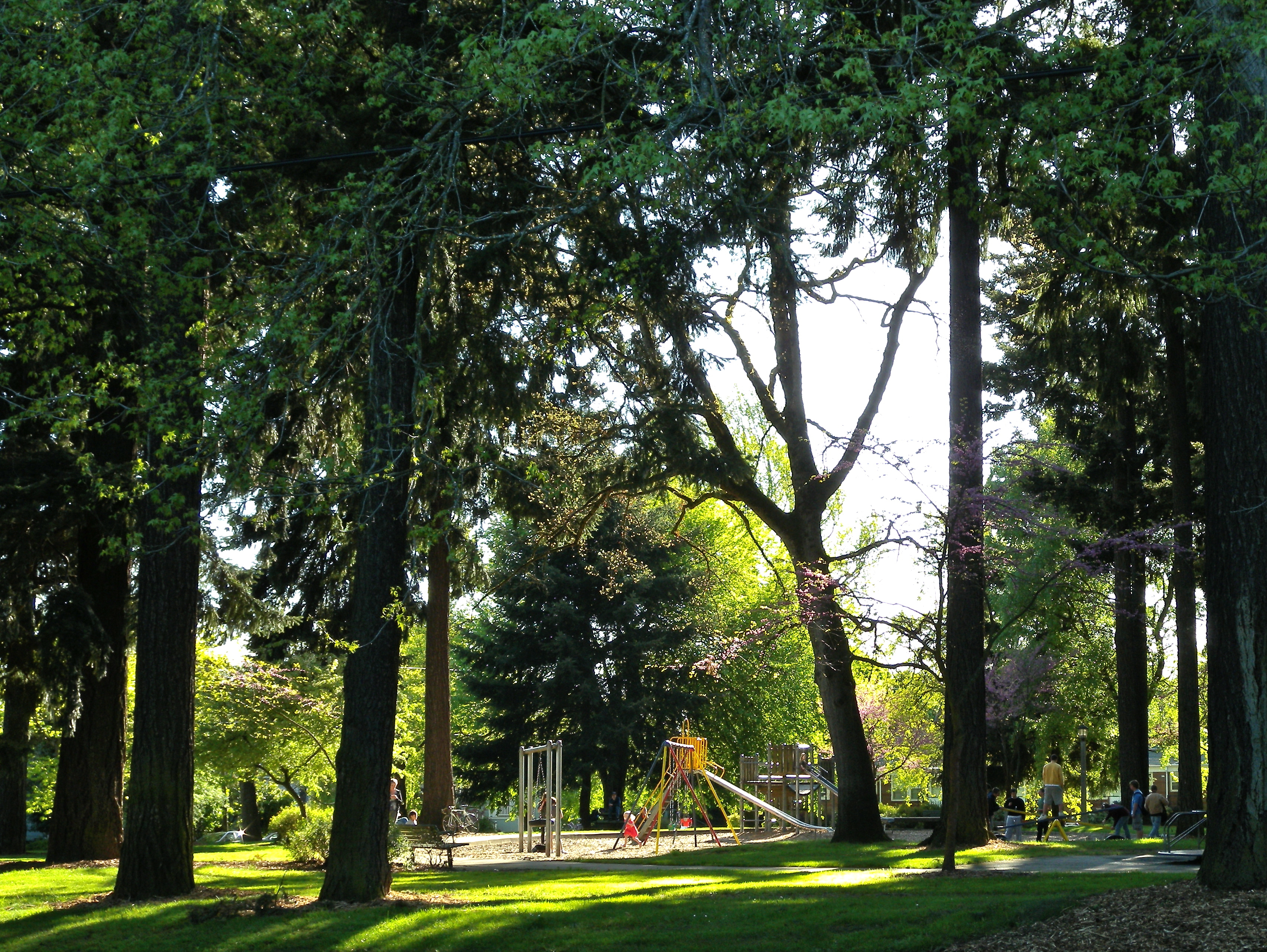
- The park in 2009
- Interactive map of Oregon Park
- Location: NE 30th Ave. and Oregon St. Portland, Oregon
- Nearest city: Portland, Oregon, United States
- Coordinates: 45.52795°N 122.635°W
- Area: 3.29 acres (1.33 ha)
- Operator: Portland Parks & Recreation

Oregon Park is a park located in northeast Portland, Oregon, in the United States. It is maintained by Portland Parks & Recreation.

== Amenities ==
Includes accessible picnic area, accessible play area, accessible restroom, basketball court, paths – paved, picnic tables, and playground.

== Accessibility information ==
=== Parking ===
- Street parking
- 1 designated parking space (not next to pathway)
- Paved pathway to play area with slight slope
- 100 feet to play area

==== Play area ====
- Engineered mulch surface
- Ramp into play area
- Sensory play elements

== See also ==
- List of parks in Portland, Oregon
