= St. Johns Park (Portland, Oregon) =

Public park in Portland, Oregon, U.S.

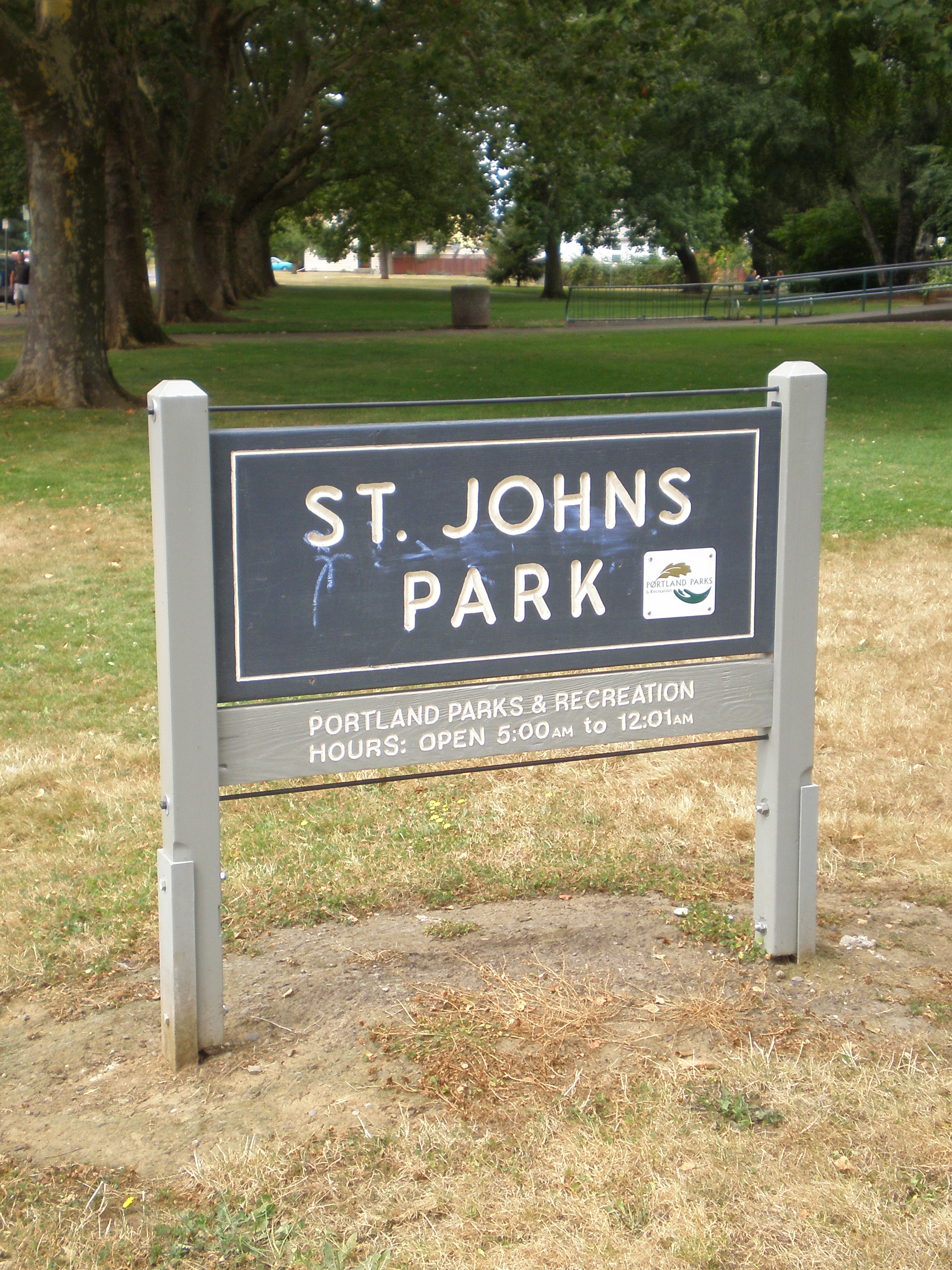
- Park signage in 2010

- Location within Portland, Oregon
- Location: 8427 N Central St. Portland, Oregon
- Coordinates: 45.592779°N 122.752206°W
- Area: 5.87 acres (2.38 ha)
- Operator: Portland Parks & Recreation

St. Johns Park is a public park in north Portland, Oregon's St. Johns neighborhood, in the United States. The 5.77-acre (2.34 ha) park was acquired in 1941.

The St. Johns Community Center is located within the park.

== See also ==
- List of parks in Portland, Oregon
