= Gammans Park =

Public park in Portland, Oregon, U.S.

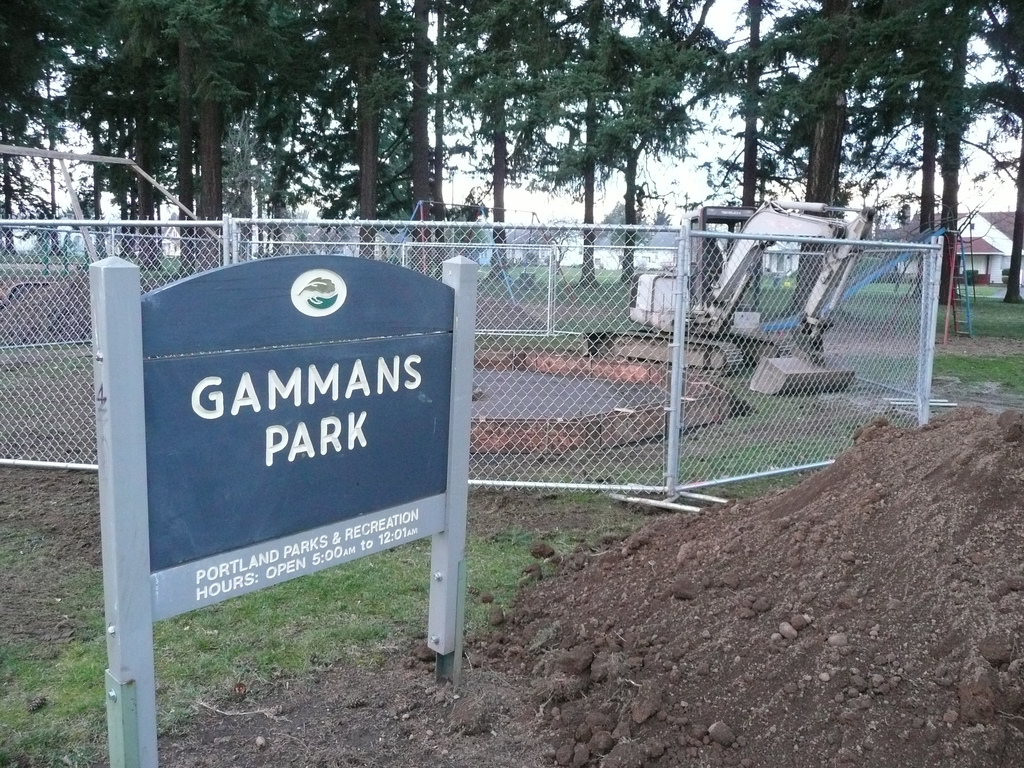
- Park signage, 2008

- Location within Portland, Oregon
- Location: N Buffalo St. and Burrage Ave. Portland, Oregon
- Coordinates: 45.575363°N 122.694028°W
- Area: 1.66 acres (0.67 ha)
- Created: 1910
- Operator: Portland Parks & Recreation

Gammans Park is a public park in north Portland, Oregon's Arbor Lodge neighborhood, in the United States. The 1.64-acre (0.66 ha) park was acquired in 1910 when the wife of lawyer George G. Gammans gave the city six lots for a park that would memorialize him.

== See also ==
- List of parks in Portland, Oregon
