= Vernon, Portland, Oregon =

Vernon
- Neighborhood
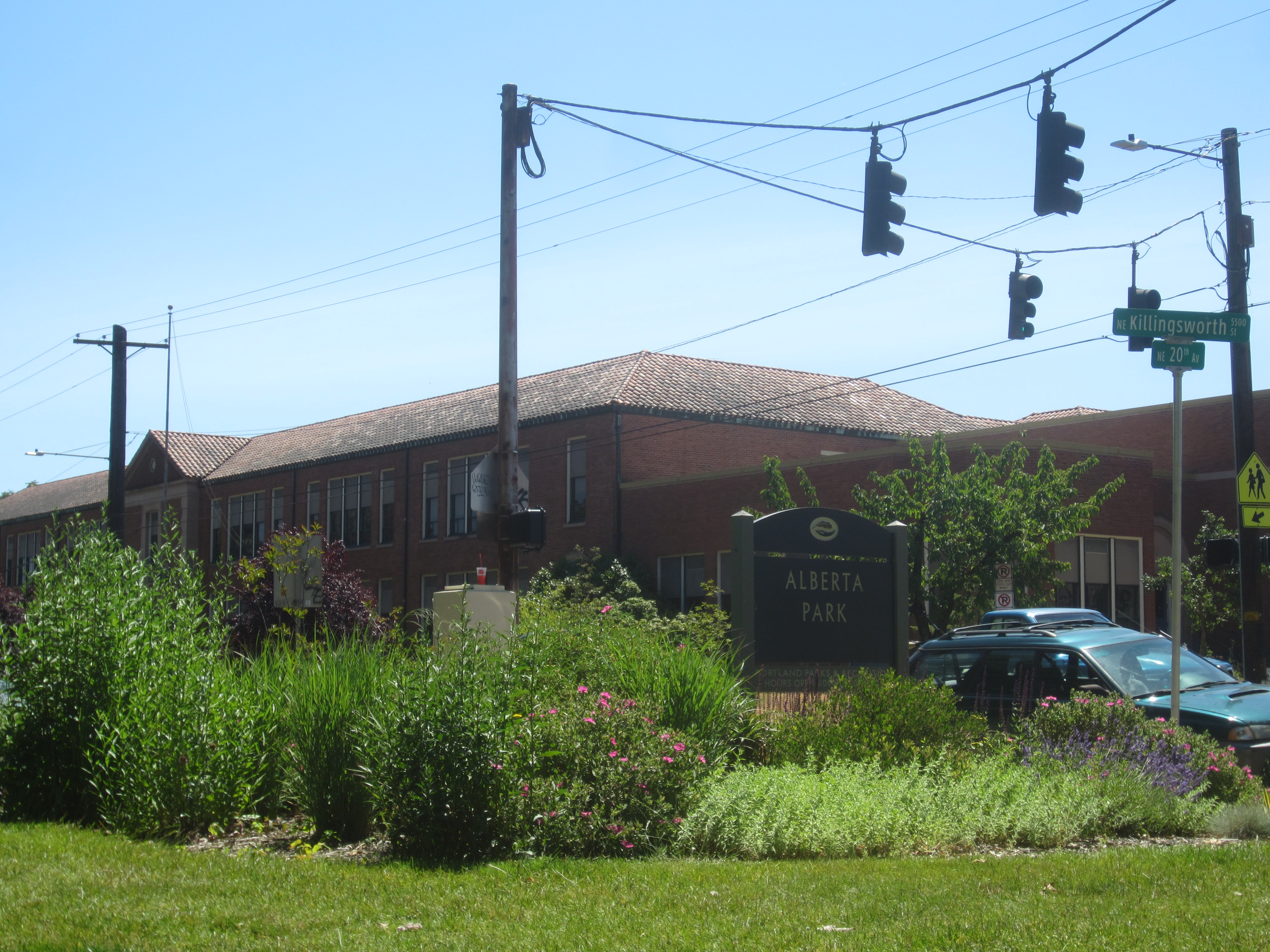
- Alberta Park entrance across the street from Vernon School
- Location in Portland
- Coordinates: 45°33′46″N 122°38′48″W
- Country: United States
- State: Oregon
- City: Portland

Government
  - Association: Vernon Neighborhood Association
  - Coalition: Northeast Coalition of Neighborhoods

Area
  - Total: 0.29 sq mi (0.75 km^{2})

Population (2000)
  - Total: 2,883
  - Density: 10,000/sq mi (3,800/km^{2})

Housing
  - No. of households: 1036
  - Occupancy rate: 95% occupied
  - Owner-occupied: 546 households (53%)
  - Renting: 490 households (47%)
  - Avg. household size: 2.78 persons

Vernon is a neighborhood in the Northeast section of Portland, Oregon, United States.

== Geography ==
Vernon is bordered by the Woodlawn neighborhood to the north, Concordia to the east, Sabin to the south, and King on the west.

== Features ==
Vernon is home to Alberta Park and encompasses a significant portion of the Alberta Arts District, a cultural and commercial corridor along NE Alberta Street that it shares with the King and Concordia neighborhoods. The district is known for locally owned shops, galleries, and cafes.
