= List of community gardens in Portland, Oregon =

This article contains lists of Portland Parks & Recreation community gardens, organized by neighborhood, in the U.S. city of Portland, Oregon. The city of Portland has provided "gardening opportunities" since 1975, in the shape of 50 community gardens across the city. These are available on a "first-come, first-served basis".

The Friends of Portland Community Gardens describes itself as an "all-volunteer, nonprofit organization" with the mission of supporting community gardening opportunities for city residents. GrowPortland operates (2015) five community gardens in the city, collaborating with "nonprofit, private and municipal landowners" to transform "underused spaces" into gardens. The Portland Community Gardens project addressed the problem that the city's residents, schools and housing developments faced a long waiting list for garden plots; it received funding between 2010 and 2011 which enabled it to create 150 new garden plots, and further funding in 2012. The project has helped to plan new school/community gardens, and has liaised with other organizations to increase access to gardens, fund irrigation, and provide new school gardens. Food for Oregon, a community food programs database intended to increase local food security, describes the Portland Community Gardens project and gives its budget as $100,000-$499,999 annually.

The Portland organization "Growing Gardens" states that "We organize hundreds of volunteers to build organic, raised bed vegetable gardens in backyards, front yards, side yards and even on balconies", working with low income households, school garden clubs and community members to produce organic vegetables to get "at the root of hunger in Portland, Oregon". Portland State University College of Urban and Public Affairs has compiled a map of community gardens in the Portland region, as part of a "Food System Sustainability Analysis".

== North Portland ==
Name	Image	Location	Size	Description
Beach Community Garden		N Campbell Ave. and Going Ct.	0.41 acres (0.17 ha)	The Beach Community Garden was acquired in 2003.
Boise–Eliot Community Garden		318 N Fremont St.	0.13 acres (0.053 ha)	Acquired in 1990, the Boise–Eliot Community Garden is named after Portland school board member and Oregon Supreme Court justice Reuben P. Boise as well as Reverend Thomas Lamb Eliot, a Multnomah County school superintendent and director of the Portland Library Association.
Johns Community Garden		N Edison St. and John Ave.	0.62 acres (0.25 ha)	The Johns Community Garden was acquired in 1974.
McCoy Community Garden		N Newman Ave. and Fessenden St.	—	The McCoy Community Garden was acquired in 2004.
Patton Community Garden		4619 N Michigan Ave.	—	The Patton Community Garden was acquired in 2002.
Pier Community Garden		N Iris Way and Barr Ave.	—	The Pier Community Garden was acquired in 2004.
Portsmouth Community Garden	Portsmouth Community Garden	N Hunt St. and Courtenay Ave.	0.23 acres (0.093 ha)	The Portsmouth Community Garden was acquired in 2001.

== Northeast Portland ==
Name	Image	Location	Size	Description
Cully Community Garden		NE 42nd Ave. and Killingworth St.	0.4 acres (0.16 ha)	Cully Community Garden was acquired in 1993.
Emerson Street Garden		822 NE Emerson St.	0.2 acres (0.081 ha)	Emerson Street Garden is a communal garden, open to all for planting, harvesting, and community use. Emerson Street Garden is run by Groundwork Portland. Contact 503-662-2590 for more information.
Everett Community Garden		NE 27th Ave. and Everett St.	0.39 acres (0.16 ha)	Everett Community Garden was acquired in 1988.
Frazier Community Garden		NE 52nd Avenue and Pacific St	0.23 acres (0.093 ha)	Frazier Community Garden was acquired in 2011 and opened in 2012.
Hazelwood Community Garden		NE 117th and Holladay	0.34 acres (0.14 ha)	Hazelwood Community Garden was acquired in 2008.
Kennedy Community Garden		5736 NE 33rd Ave.	0.29 acres (0.12 ha)	Kennedy Community Garden was acquired in 1999.
Madison Community Garden		2735 NE 82nd	—	
Rigler Community Garden	Rigler Community Garden	5401 NE Prescott St.	0.3 acres (0.12 ha)	
Sabin Community Garden		NE 19th Ave. and Skidmore St.	0.1 acres (0.040 ha)	Sabin Community Garden was acquired in 1995.
Senn's Community Garden		NE 112th Ave. and Prescott St.	—	Senn's Community Garden was acquired in 2007.
Vestal Community Garden		NE 81st Ave. and Everett St.	—	
Woodlawn Community Garden		NE 11th Ave. and Claremont	0.4 acres (0.16 ha)	

== Northwest Portland ==
Name	Image	Location	Size	Description
Adams Community Garden		4300 NW Cornell Rd.	0.09 acres (0.036 ha)	Nina B. Adams originally purchased this 0.09-acre (360 m^{2}) piece of land to build her home on, but in 1968 she donated the property to Portland. The community garden, acquired in 1976, is located in the northwest corner of the property.

== Southeast Portland ==
Name	Image	Location	Size	Description
Berrydale Community Garden		SE 90th Ave. and Taylor St.	—	Berrydale Community Garden was acquired in 1976.
Brentwood Community Garden		SE 57th Ave. and Cooper St.	1.03 acres (0.42 ha)	Located in Brentwood Park, Brentwood Community Garden was acquired in 1996.
Brooklyn Community Garden		SE Franklin and SE McLoughlin/ 99E	—	Founded in 2012 under the auspices of the Brooklyn Action Corps Neighborhood Association and Southeast Uplift.
Buckman Community Garden		SE 18th Ave. and Oak St.	0.15 acres (0.061 ha)	Acquired in 1980, Buckman Community Garden is named after Cyrus Buckman, an orchardist during the late 1800s who was also a member of the Portland school board and city council.
Clinton Community Garden		SE 18th Ave. and Clinton St.	0.42 acres (0.17 ha)	Clinton Community Garden was acquired in 1994.
Colonel Summers Community Garden		SE 20th Ave. and Taylor St.	—	Colonel Summers Community Garden was acquired in 1975.
Earl Boyles Community Garden		SE 110th Ave. and Francis St.	—	Earl Boyles Community Garden was acquired in 2007.
Ivon Community Garden		SE 37th Ave. and Ivon St.	0.19 acres (0.077 ha)	Ivon Community Garden was acquired in 1978.
Lents Community Garden		SE 88th Ave. and Steele St.	—	Lents Community Garden was acquired in 1976.
Peace Community Garden		12727 SE Market	—	Peace Community Garden was acquired in 2008.
Sellwood Community Garden		SE 21st Ave. and Harney St.	—	Sellwood Community Garden was acquired in 2004.
Sewallcrest Community Garden		SE 31st Ave. and Market St.	—	Sewallcrest Community Garden was acquired in 1974.

== Southwest Portland ==
Name	Image	Location	Size	Description
Front and Curry Community Garden		SW Naito Pkwy. and Curry St.	0.23 acres (0.093 ha)	Front & Curry Community Garden was acquired in 1952.
Fulton Community Garden		SW 3rd Ave. and Miles St.	1.77 acres	Fulton Community Garden was acquired in 1974 and includes a compost demonstration site.
Gabriel Community Garden and Orchard		SW 41st Ave. and Canby St.	1.03 acres	The Gabriel Community Garden & Orchard was acquired in 1975.
Vermont Hills Community Garden		SW 55th Ave. and Iowa St.	0.22 acres (0.089 ha)	The Vermont Hills Community Garden was acquired in 1978.
Water & Gibbs Community Garden		SW Water Ave. and Gibbs St.	0.25 acres (0.10 ha)	The Water & Gibbs Community Garden was acquired in 1976.

== See also ==
- Community gardening in the United States
- List of parks in Portland, Oregon
