= Lincoln Park (Portland, Oregon) =

Public park in Portland, Oregon, U.S.

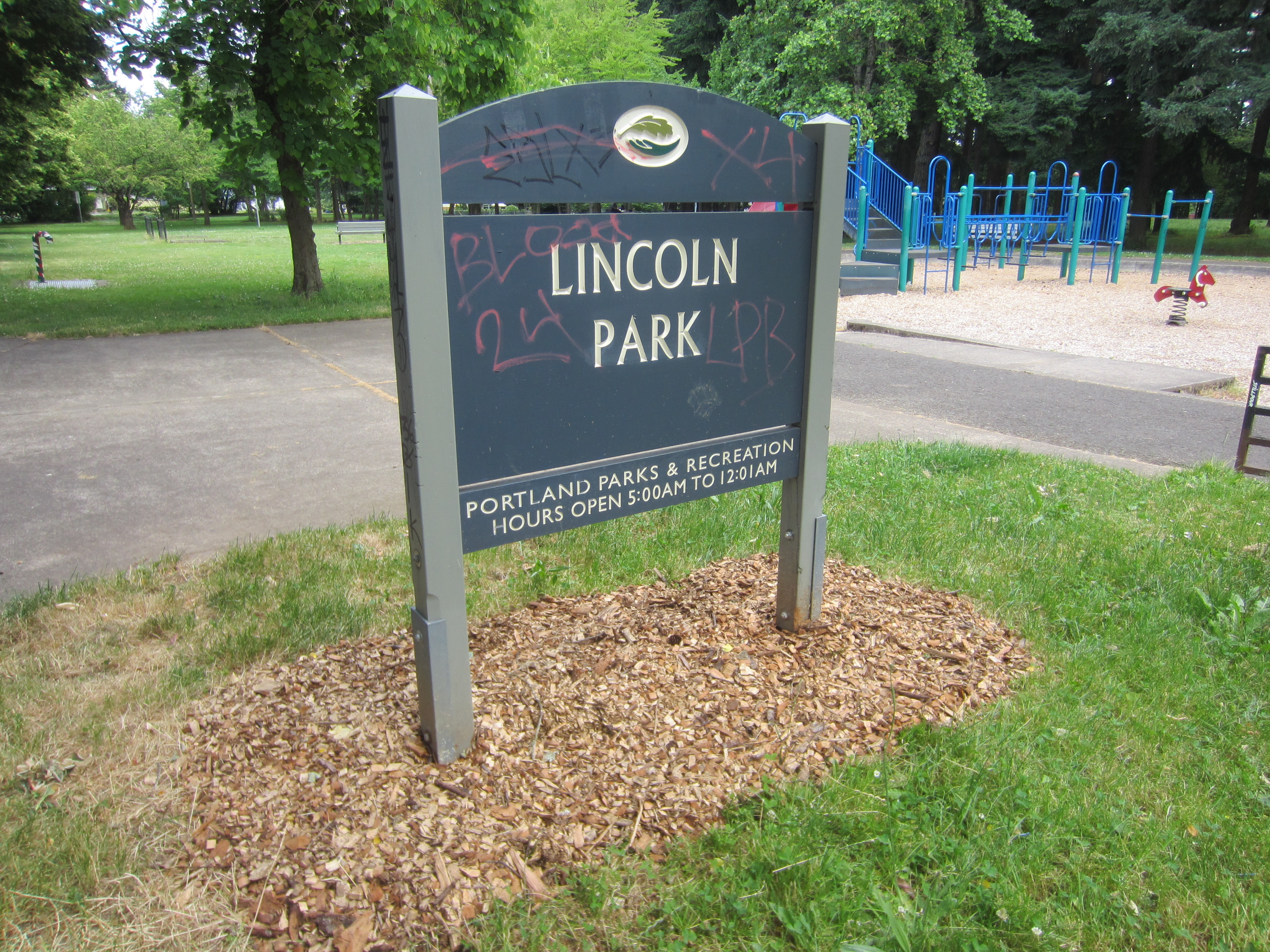
- Park sign, 2022
- Interactive map of Lincoln Park
- Location: SE 135th Ave. and Mill St. Portland, Oregon
- Coordinates: 45°30′35″N 122°31′35″W
- Area: 7.06 acres (2.86 ha)
- Created: 1993
- Operator: Portland Parks & Recreation

Lincoln Park is a 7.06-acre (2.86 ha) public park in southeast Portland, Oregon. The park was acquired in 1993.
