= Wellington Park (Portland, Oregon) =

Park in Portland, Oregon, U.S.

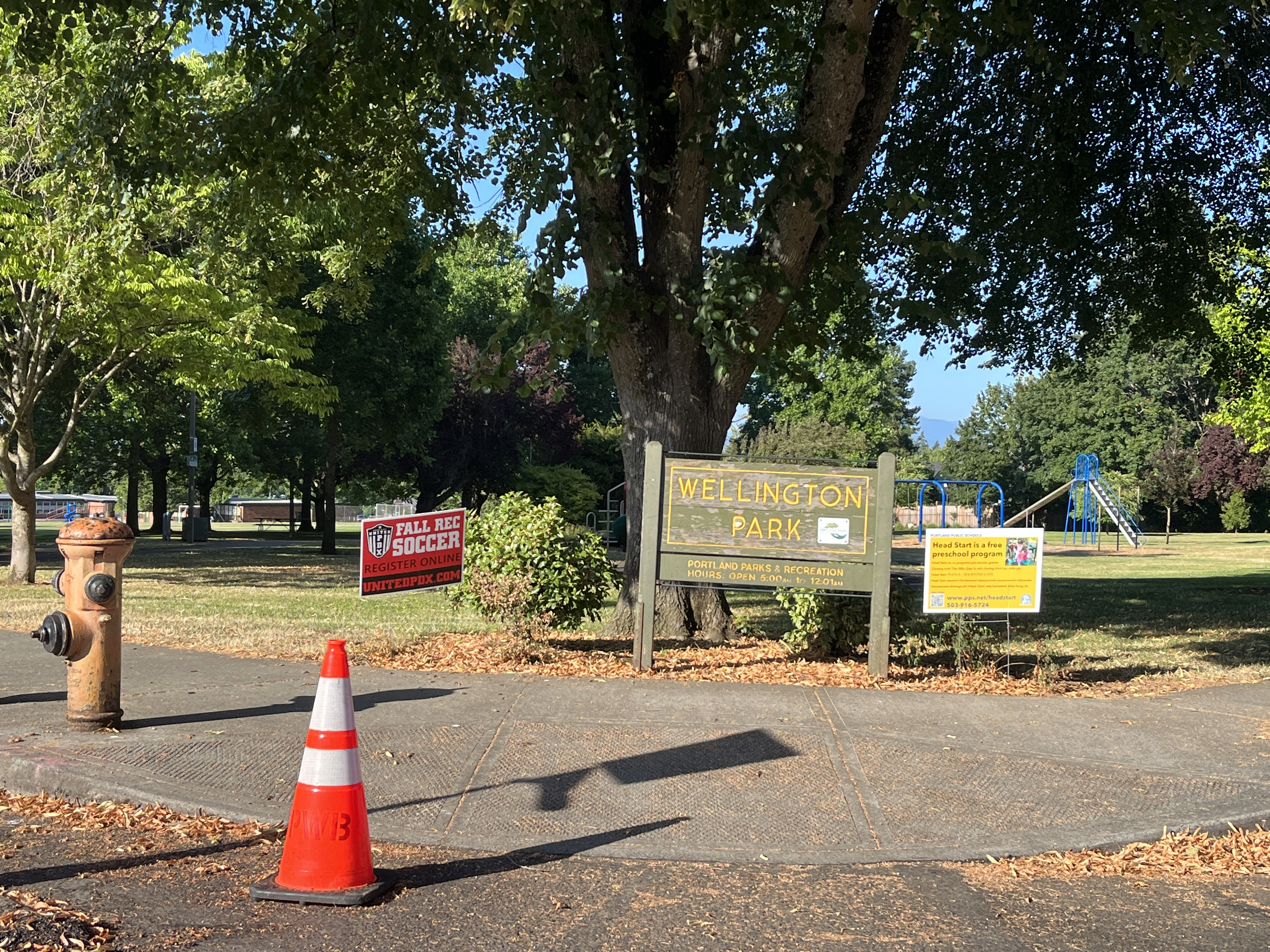
- Park sign, 2022
- Interactive map of Wellington Park
- Location: NE 66th Ave. and Mason St. Portland, Oregon
- Coordinates: 45°33′12″N 122°35′40″W
- Area: 3.97 acres (1.61 ha)
- Operator: Portland Parks & Recreation

Wellington Park is a public park in Portland, Oregon. The 3.97-acre (1.61 ha) park in Northeast Portland's Roseway neighborhood was acquired in 1941.

In 2021, Commissioner Carmen Rubio announced funding for a "splash pad style outdoor play area" in the park. Wellington has also hosted concerts and Movies in the Park.
