= Alberta Park =

Public park in Portland, Oregon, U.S.

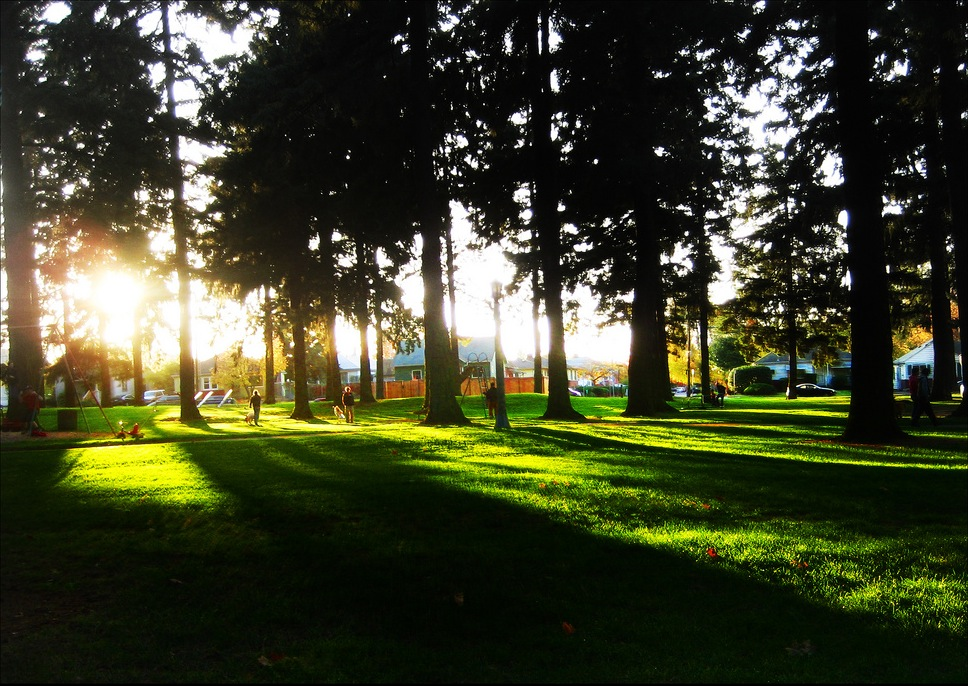
- Interactive map of Alberta Park
- Location: NE 22nd Ave. and Killingsworth St. Portland, Oregon
- Nearest city: Portland, Oregon, U.S.
- Coordinates: 45°33′52″N 122°38′41″W
- Area: 16.40 acres (6.64 ha)
- Created: 1921
- Operator: Portland Parks & Recreation

Alberta Park is a park located in northeast Portland, Oregon. Acquired in 1921, the park includes a basketball court, dog off-leash area, playground, soccer field, softball field and tennis court, as well as paved and unpaved paths and picnic tables. The park is maintained by a volunteer group known as Friends of Alberta Park.

== See also ==
- List of parks in Portland, Oregon
