= Chimney Park =

Public park in Portland, Oregon, U.S.

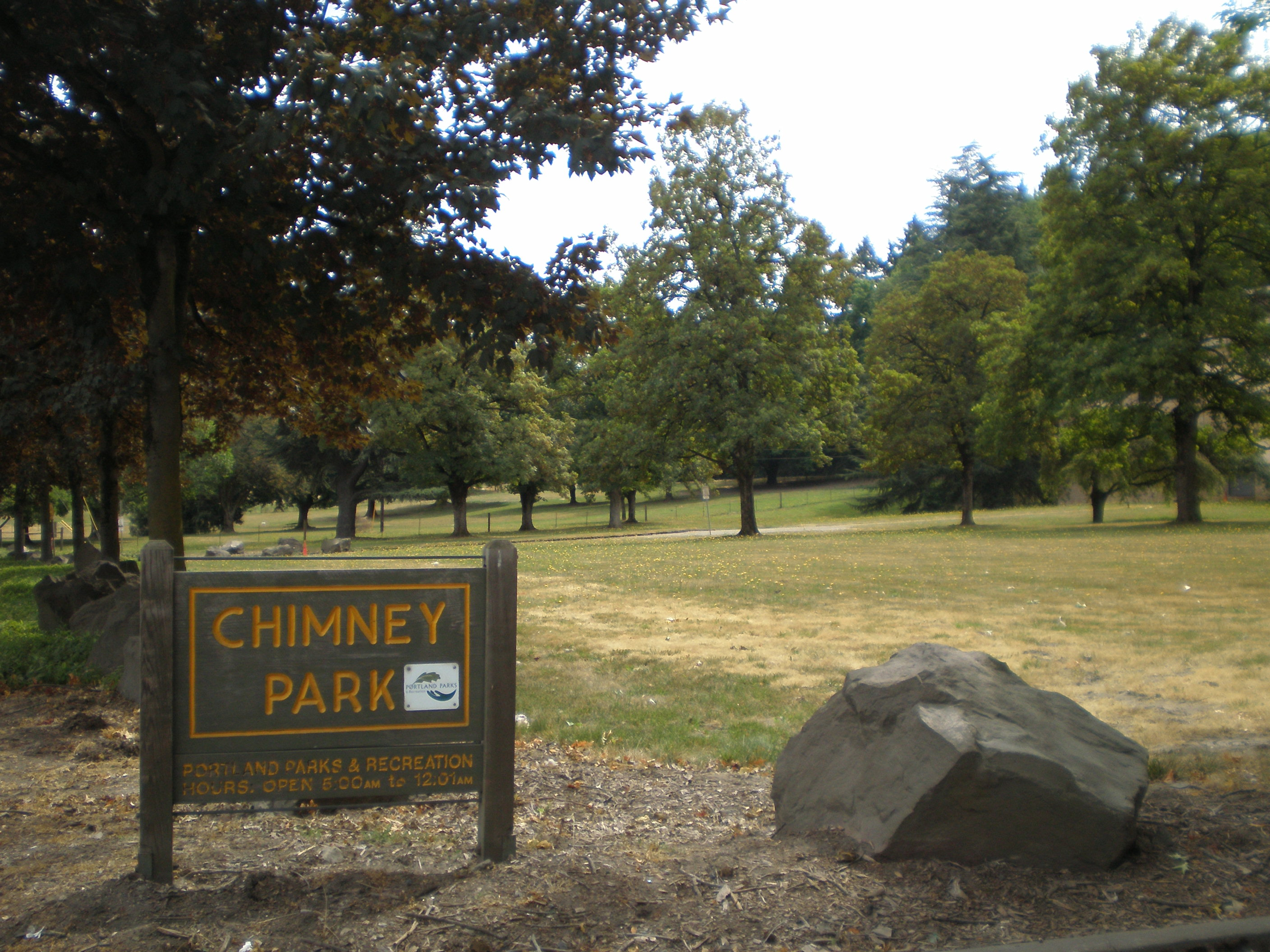
- Park sign, 2010

- Location within Portland, Oregon
- Location: 9360 N Columbia Blvd. Portland, Oregon
- Coordinates: 45.607°N 122.759°W
- Area: 18.39 acres (7.44 ha)
- Created: 1932
- Operator: Portland Parks & Recreation

Chimney Park is a 18.39-acre (7.44 ha) public park in Portland, Oregon's St. Johns neighborhood, in the United States. The park was acquired in 1932; formerly the site of a city incinerator, the park was named after the incinerator's chimney.
