= Knott Park =

Public park in Portland, Oregon, U.S.

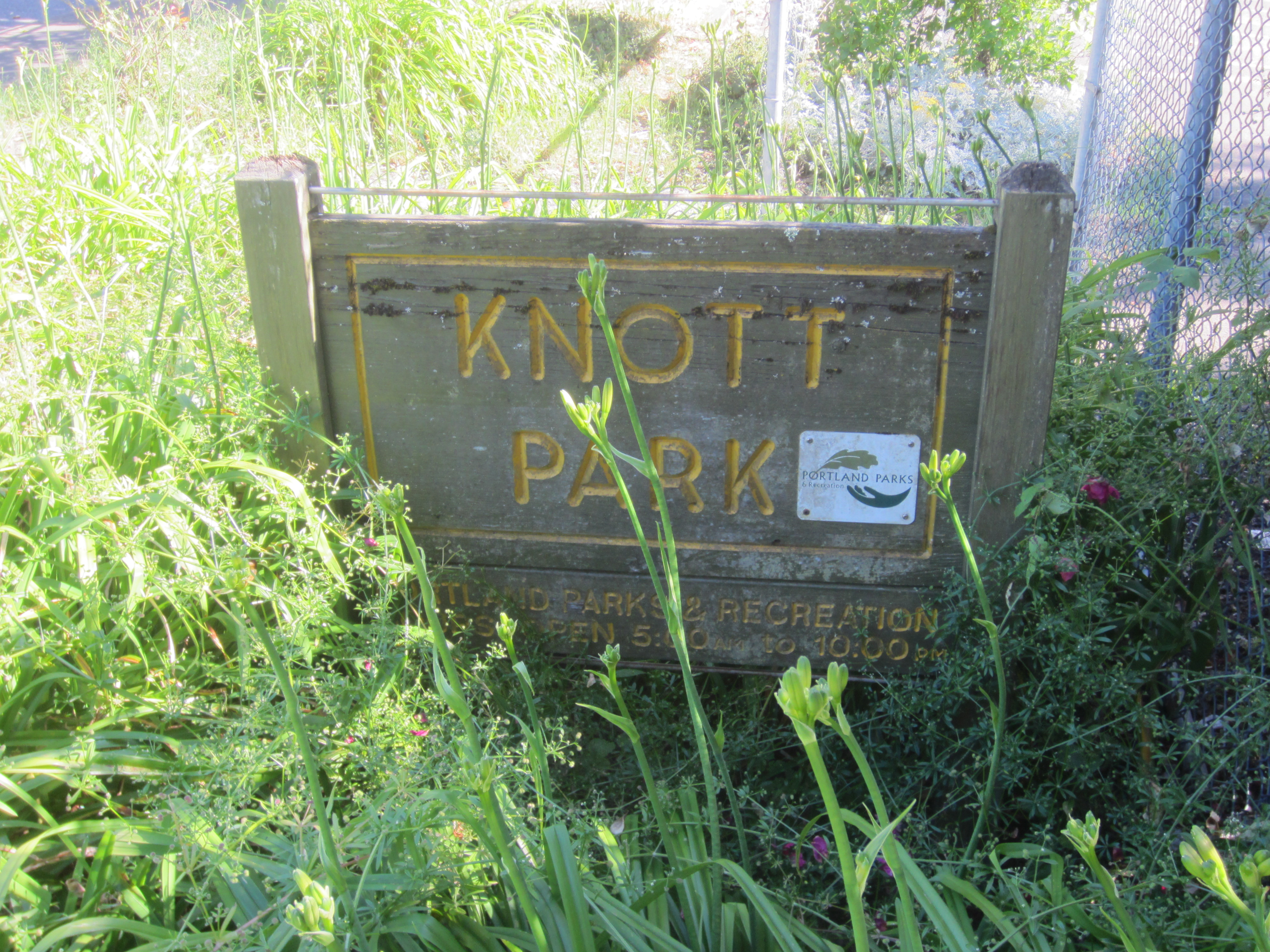
- Park sign, 2022
- Interactive map of Knott Park
- Location: NE 117th Ave. and Knott St. Portland, Oregon
- Coordinates: 45°32′26″N 122°32′43″W
- Area: 12.74 acres (5.16 ha)
- Operator: Portland Parks & Recreation

Knott Park is a 12.74-acre (5.16 ha) public park in the Parkrose Heights neighborhood of northeastern Portland, Oregon, United States. The park was acquired in 1986.
