= Woodlawn Park (Portland, Oregon) =

Park in Portland, Oregon, U.S.

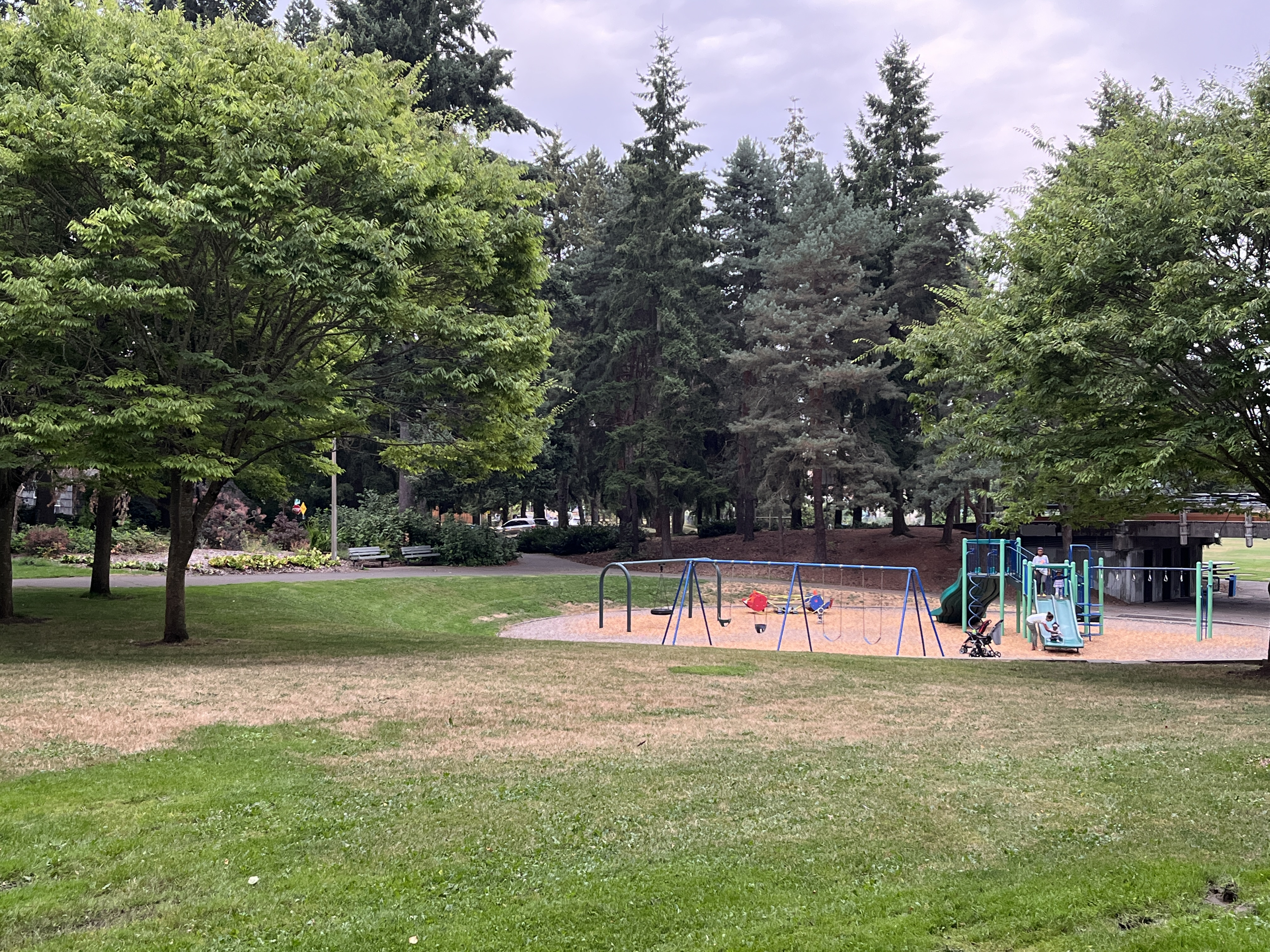
- Part of Woodlawn Park in 2022
- Interactive map of Woodlawn Park
- Location: NE 13th Ave. and Dekum St. Portland, Oregon
- Coordinates: 45°34′21″N 122°39′15″W
- Area: 8.23 acres (3.33 ha)
- Operator: Portland Parks & Recreation

Woodlawn Park is a 8.23-acre (3.33 ha) public park in northeast Portland, Oregon. Operated by Portland Parks & Recreation, the park was acquired in 1975.
