= North Powellhurst Park =

Public park in Portland, Oregon, U.S.

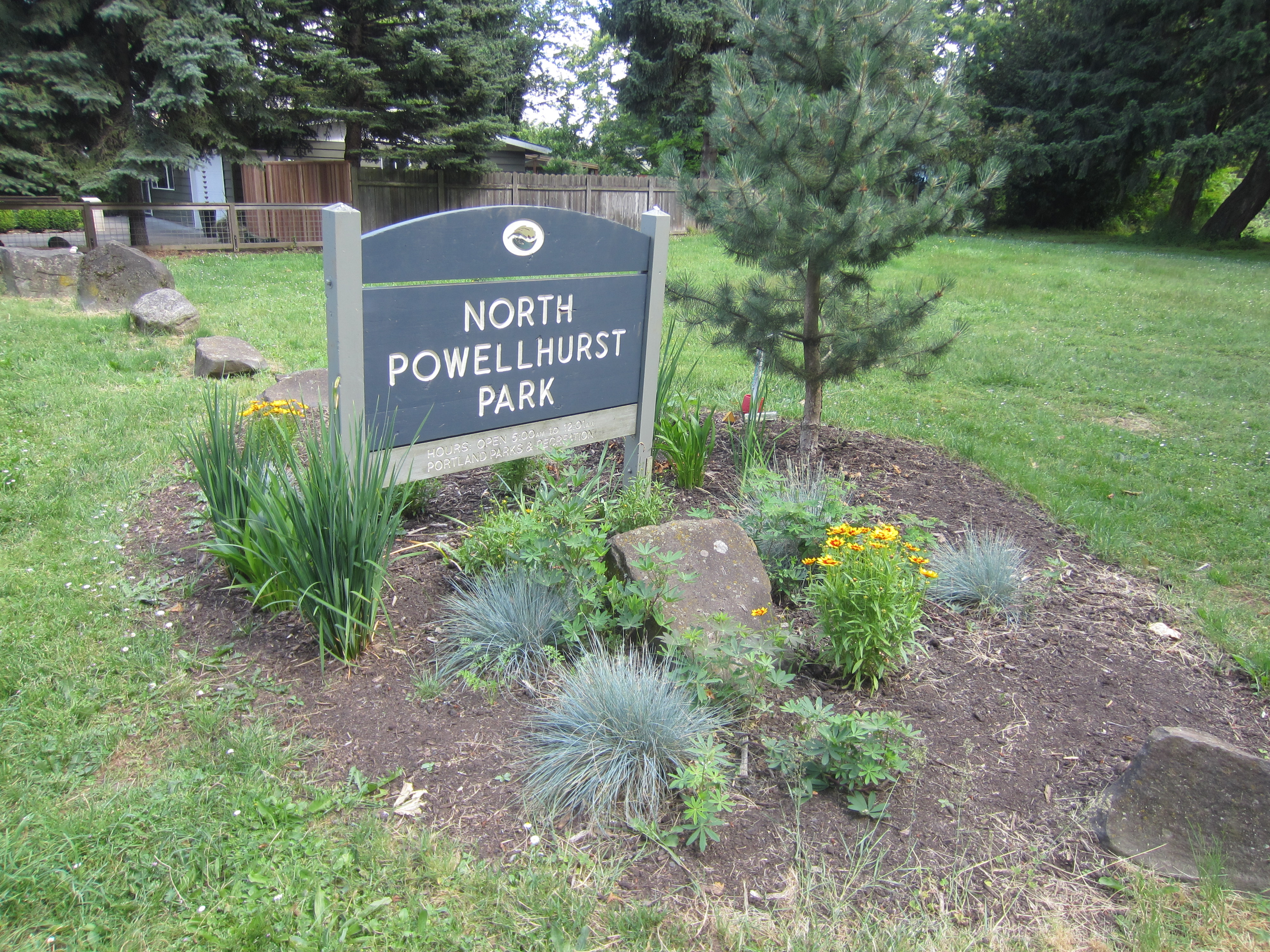
- Park sign, 2022
- Interactive map of North Powellhurst Park
- Location: SE 135th Ave. and Main St. Portland, Oregon
- Coordinates: 45°30′51″N 122°31′25″W
- Area: 3.9 acres (1.6 ha)
- Operator: Portland Parks & Recreation

North Powellhurst Park is a 3.9-acre (1.6 ha) public park in southeast Portland, Oregon. The park was acquired in 1993.
