= Essex Park (Portland, Oregon) =

Public park in Portland, Oregon, U.S.

Coordinates: 45°29′40″N 122°35′0″W

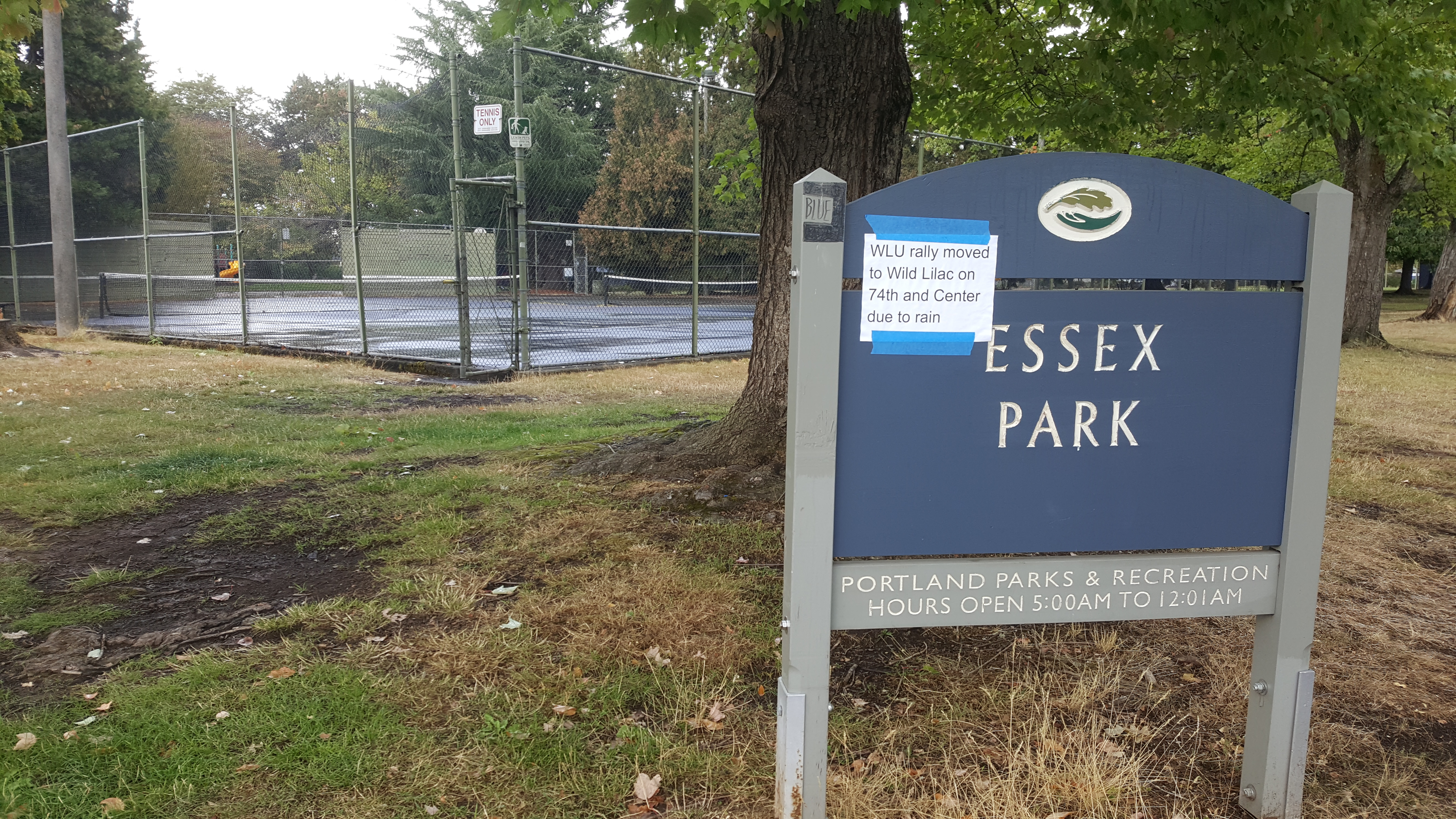
- Park sign, 2021

- Location within Oregon
- Location: SE 79th Ave. and Center St. Portland, Oregon
- Area: 4.43 acres (1.79 ha)
- Created: 1940
- Operator: Portland Parks & Recreation

Essex Park is a 4.43-acre (1.79 ha) public park in Portland, Oregon's Foster-Powell neighborhood, in the United States. The park was acquired in 1940. The park is the neighborhood's largest and features a playground, baseball field, basketball and tennis courts, and a splash pad. A mural was added in 2018.
