= Cherry Park =

Public park in Portland, Oregon, U.S.

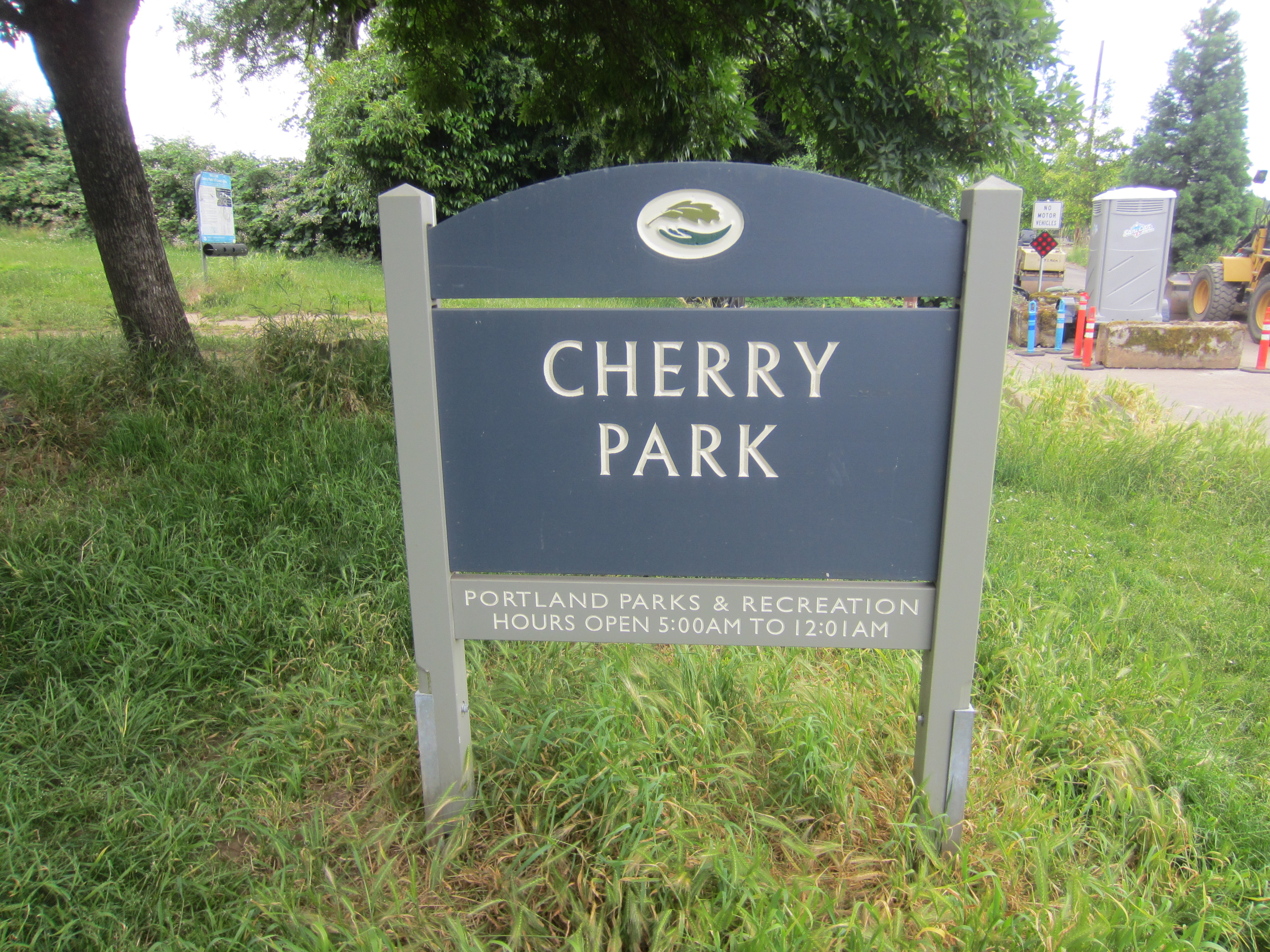
- Park sign, 2022
- Interactive map of Cherry Park
- Location: SE 110th Ave. and Stephens St. Portland, Oregon
- Coordinates: 45°30′35″N 122°33′2″W
- Area: 10.23 acres (4.14 ha)
- Operator: Portland Parks & Recreation

Cherry Park is a 10.23-acre (4.14 ha) public park in southeast Portland, Oregon. The park was acquired in 1985.
