= Merrifield Park =

Public park in Portland, Oregon, U.S.

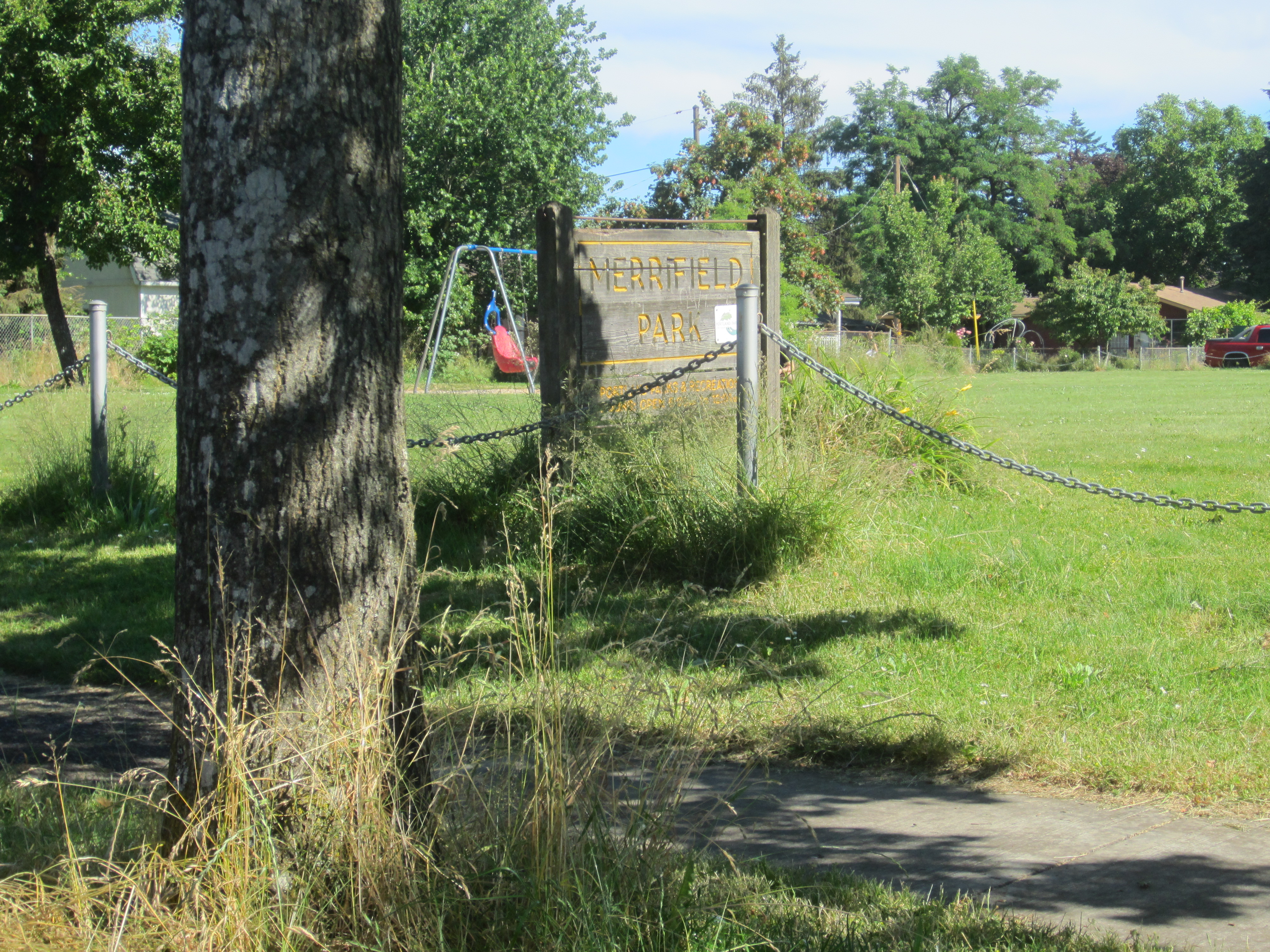
- Park sign, 2022
- Interactive map of Merrifield Park
- Location: NE 117th Ave. and Thompson St. Portland, Oregon
- Coordinates: 45°32′18″N 122°32′27″W
- Area: 0.95 acres (0.38 ha)
- Operator: Portland Parks & Recreation

Merrifield Park is a 0.95-acre (0.38 ha) public park in the Parkrose Heights neighborhood of northeastern Portland, Oregon, United States. The park was acquired in 1985.
