= Parklane Park =

Public park in Portland, Oregon, U.S.

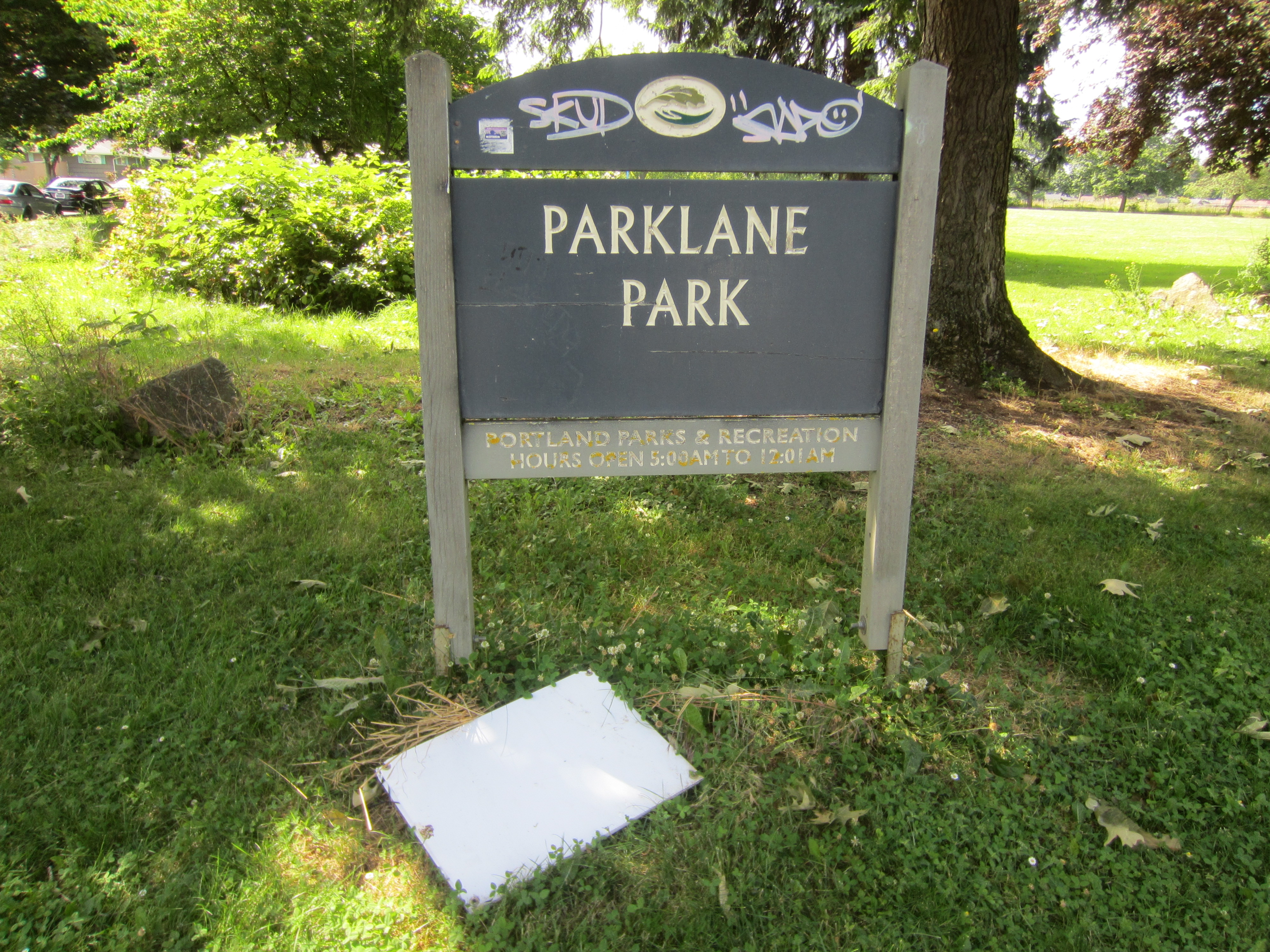
- Park sign, 2022
- Interactive map of Parklane Park
- Location: SE 155th Ave. and Main St. Portland, Oregon
- Coordinates: 45°30′48″N 122°30′16″W
- Area: 25.6 acres (10.4 ha)
- Operator: Portland Parks & Recreation

Parklane Park is a 25.6-acre (10.4 ha) public park in southeast Portland, Oregon, United States. The park was acquired in 1993.

The park reopened in 2025.

== History ==
From June 1946 to June 1959, Parklane Park was the site of a section of Troh's Skypark, a small airport operated by local pilot & businessman Henry Troh. It consisted of two primarily unpaved runways and 3 hangars, had amenities such as a lounge and café in one of the hangars (the Skyroom Café) and was allegedly the largest privately-built airport in Oregon. It served to train students, host pilots' clubs, for Troh and his associates to sell aircraft, and enjoyed success before closing due to municipal taxes and the construction of a new retirement community.

The airport was replaced by a fenced-off sand and gravel quarry owned by the Oregon Asphaltic Paving Company in the 1960s, which hit the water table in 1984, leading to area residents to use it to occasionally swim or fish. The quarry was filled throughout the 1990s, mostly with soils excavated from projects around Portland at no cost, saving around $1 million.

When the surrounding neighborhoods were constructed in the 1970s, the parcel south of the quarry became a Multnomah County park. Many of the trees were planted by local residents who also installed red and white striped playground equipment, giving rise to the nickname "Candy Cane Park". The City of Portland acquired Parklane Park in 1993.

The park was significantly expanded from its original approximate five acres, which included only a basketball court, a dirt baseball field, and a playground. Parklane Park reopened on May 9, 2025 with community gardens, an off-leash dog area, pavilion, soccer fields, basketball and tennis courts, a skate park, splash pad, three separate playgrounds and a picnic area.
