= Fernhill Park (Oregon) =

Public park in Portland, Oregon, U.S.

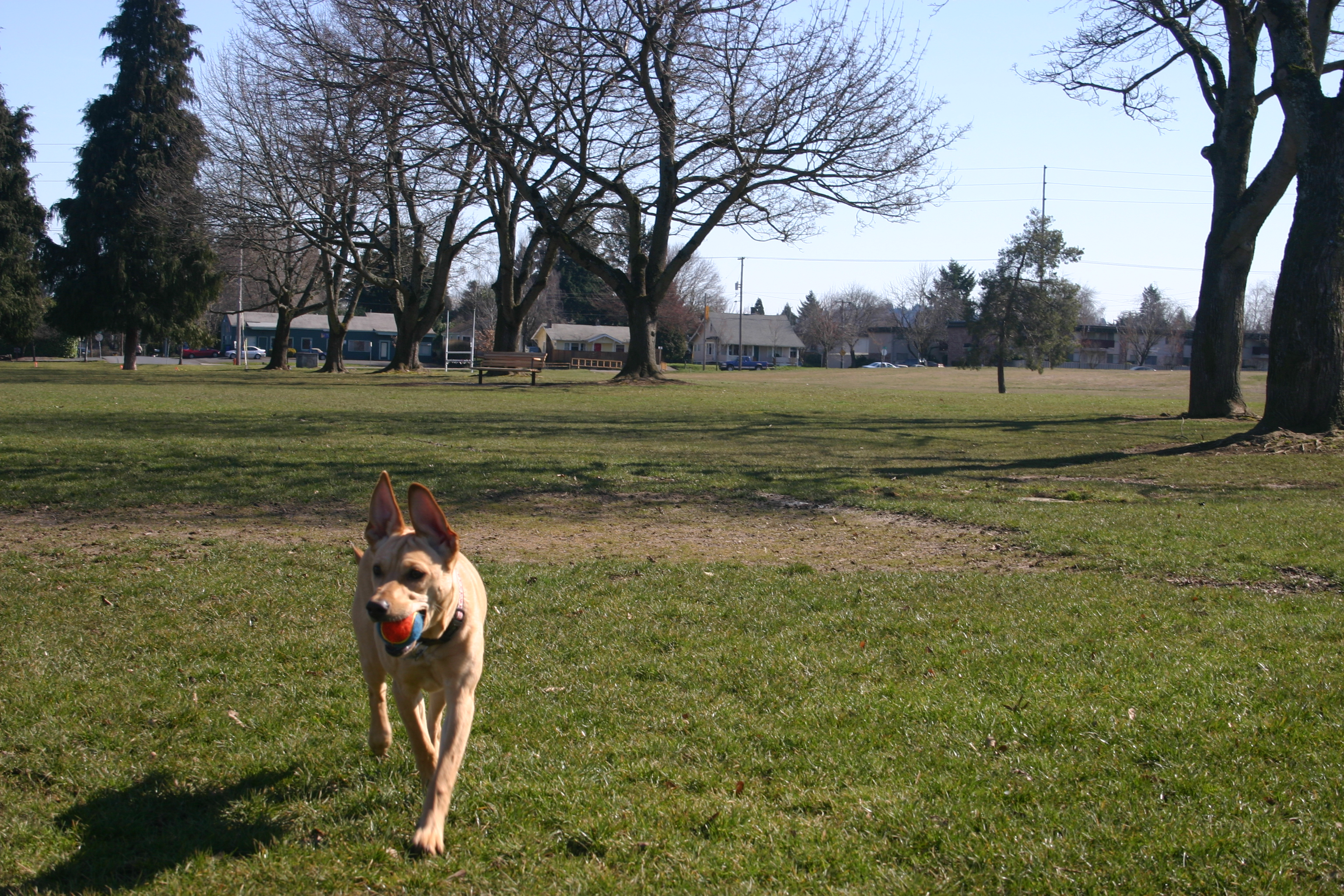
- Interactive map of Fernhill Park
- Location: NE 37th Avenue and Ainsworth Street Portland, OR 97211
- Nearest city: Portland, Oregon, U.S.
- Coordinates: 45.5666°N 122.62305°W
- Area: 26.71 acres (10.81 ha)
- Created: 1940
- Operator: Portland Parks & Recreation

Fernhill Park is a public park in Portland, Oregon. Located in the Concordia neighborhood, it is one of the largest parks in Northeast Portland, with 26.71 acres (10.81 ha) and a variety of recreational facilities. The park has a large off-leash dog play area composed of rolling hills and large trees, a forest garden, playgrounds, a splash pad during summer, and sports facilities such as a 400 meter track and fields for softball, baseball, soccer, and volleyball. The park has also hosted outdoor movies and has been the starting point for the Portland World Naked Bike Ride.

== See also ==
- List of parks in Portland, Oregon
