= Clinton Park (Portland, Oregon) =

Public park in Portland, Oregon, U.S.

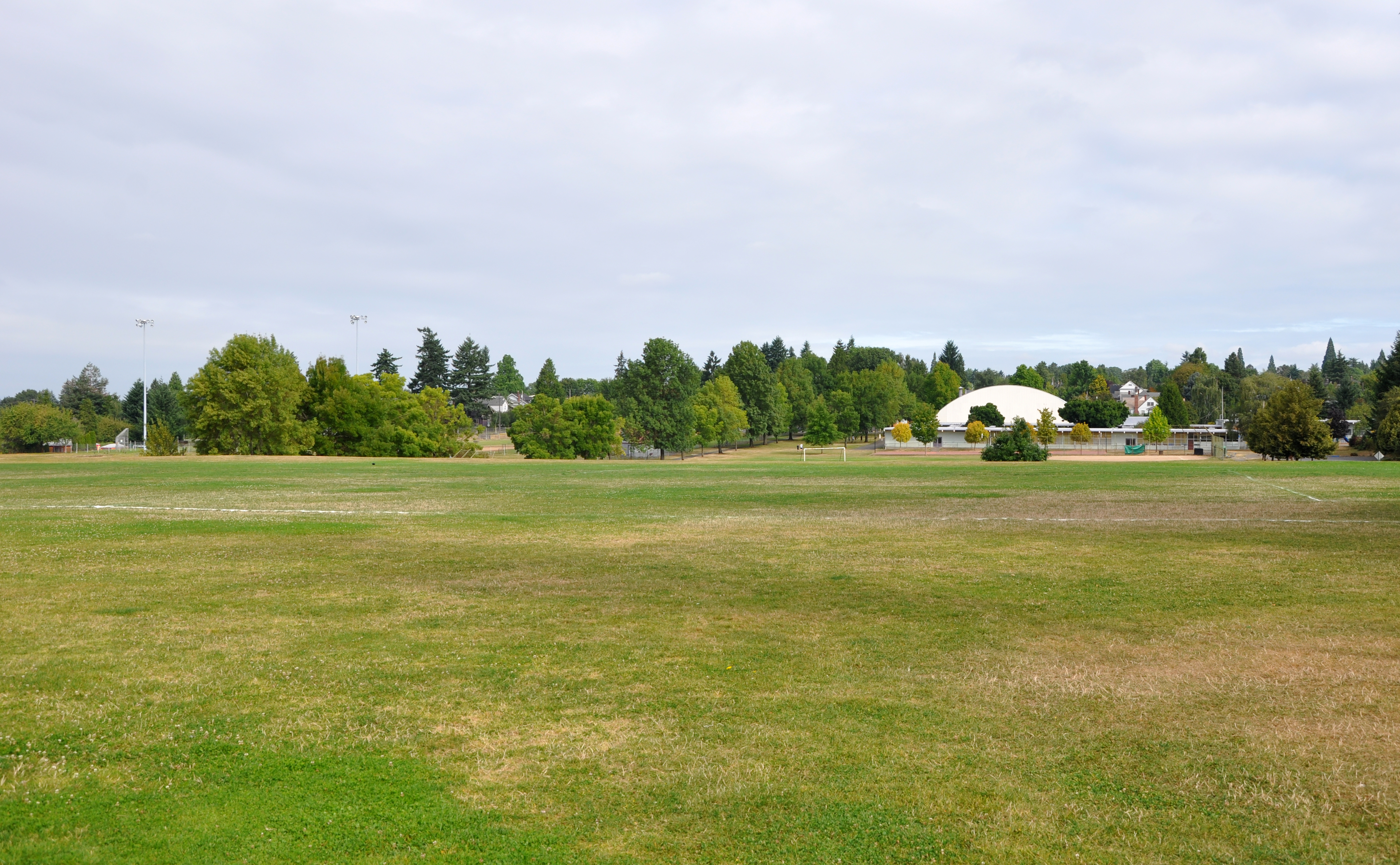
- The park in 2010

- Location within Portland, Oregon
- Location: SE 55th Ave. and Woodward St. Portland, Oregon
- Coordinates: 45°30′11″N 122°36′17″W
- Area: 12.14 acres (4.91 ha)
- Created: 1948
- Operator: Portland Parks & Recreation

Clinton Park is a 12.14-acre (4.91 ha) public park in Portland, Oregon's South Tabor neighborhood, in the United States. The space was acquired in 1948.
