= Mill Park (Portland, Oregon) =

Public park in Portland, Oregon, U.S.

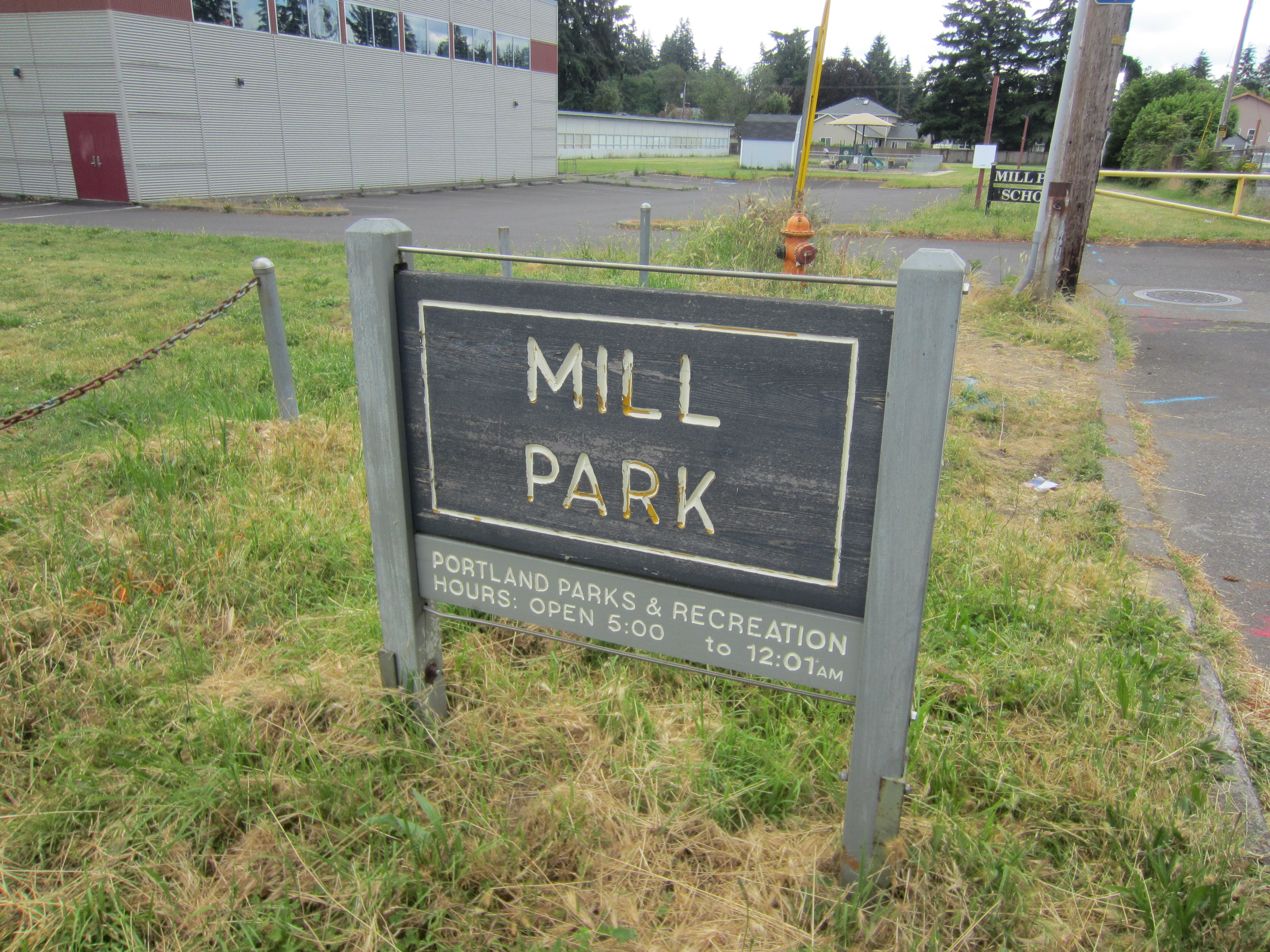
- Park sign, 2022
- Interactive map of Mill Park
- Location: SE 117th Ave. and Mill Ct. Portland, Oregon
- Coordinates: 45°30′34″N 122°32′22″W
- Area: 5.7 acres (2.3 ha)
- Operator: Portland Parks & Recreation

Mill Park is a 5.7-acre (2.3 ha) public park in southeast Portland, Oregon, United States. The park was acquired in 1986.
