= Portland Parks & Recreation =

City agency in Portland, Oregon, U.S.

Agency overview
- Formed: January 26, 1903; 123 years ago
- Jurisdiction: Portland, Oregon
- Headquarters: Portland Building
- Motto: "Healthy Parks, Healthy Portland"
- Employees: 2,794(January 2025)
- Agency executives: Sonia Shamanski, Deputy City Administrator for Vibrant Communities; Adena Long, Director of Recreation
- Parent Service Area: Vibrant Communities
- Website: www.portland.gov/parks/

Portland Parks & Recreation (PP&R) is a Bureau of the City of Portland, Oregon that manages the city parks, natural areas, recreational facilities, gardens, and trails; properties that occupy more than 10,000 acres (4,000 ha) in total.

== Agency ==
In 2025, management of the Parks Bureau was passed from commissioner Dan Ryan to Deputy City Administrator for Vibrant Communities Sonia Shamanski. The current Director of Recreation is Adena Long, who has served in this position since 2019.

The PP&R Board has 14 members which meets monthly.

The number of park rangers on staff has expanded from 10 in 2015 to enough to handle "3,000 calls and 11,000 rules violations" in 2022. The bureau employs a total of 2,794 people as of January 2025. 792 of which are full time and 2,002 are part time.

=== Charter Reform ===
A November 2022 election initiated a charter reform moving city bureaus out of the direct management of Portland City Council (Oregon). The last city council member to oversee Portland Parks & Recreation was commissioner Dan Ryan who served from 2023 until the end of 2024.

=== Finances ===
The bureau proposed a tax levy which passed in 2020 to procure an average of $48 million a year, and an independent audit in December 2024 showed those funds were clearly and transparently tracked and commitments made in the proposal were adhered to. As of 2025 PP&R faces a deficit which would decrease service by 25% if further funding isn’t obtained. Reductions could include loss of programming, pools, community centers and trash pick up.

=== Inclusion ===
The 5-year Racial Equity Plan, in place from 2017 - 2023, addressed gaps in parks services for Portland’s communities of color. In September of 2024, the three-person DEI team was placed on leave, with only the manager remaining.

== History ==
Portland’s first parks, the Plaza Blocks and two of the South Park Blocks, were established in 1852. Both came from land owned by William W. Chapman and Daniel H. Lownsdale.

The development of Portland's park system was largely guided by the Olmsted Portland park plan, outlined in 1903. The Board of Park Commissioners submitted its first receipts to the city on January 26th, 1903 and opened its membership to women later that year.

The first director of recreation within the bureau was Dorothea Marie Lensch in 1937. As part of her work in this position, she founded the Portland Children's Museum which closed permanently in 2021.

Between 1976 and 1979 PP&R conducted the Portland Neighborhood History Project, collecting oral histories from locals who arrived in the early to mid 1900’s including first PP&R Recreation Director Dorothea Marie Lensch and Margaret M. Cabell, who contributed to founding the Portland Japanese Garden, and was a founding member of the Portland Garden Club and board member of the Garden Club of America.

== Actions ==
Following a City Council decision, smoking, vaping and marijuana use have been entirely banned since July 2015 in all Portland city parks and nature areas.

In March 2021, Oregon Department of Environmental Quality fined PP&R nearly half a million dollars for failing to establish a storm water control system to prevent toxic runoff water from an industrial land the park purchased in 2004 and 2009 for building new entrance and trailhead to Forest Park.

In 2022, the parks bureau was criticized for its role in not renewing a longstanding partnership with local non-profit Friends of Trees. In 2023, many trees the city planted died due to lack of water and other causes.

== See also ==
- List of parks in Portland, Oregon
