= Johnson Creek (Willamette River tributary) =

Creek in Oregon, USA

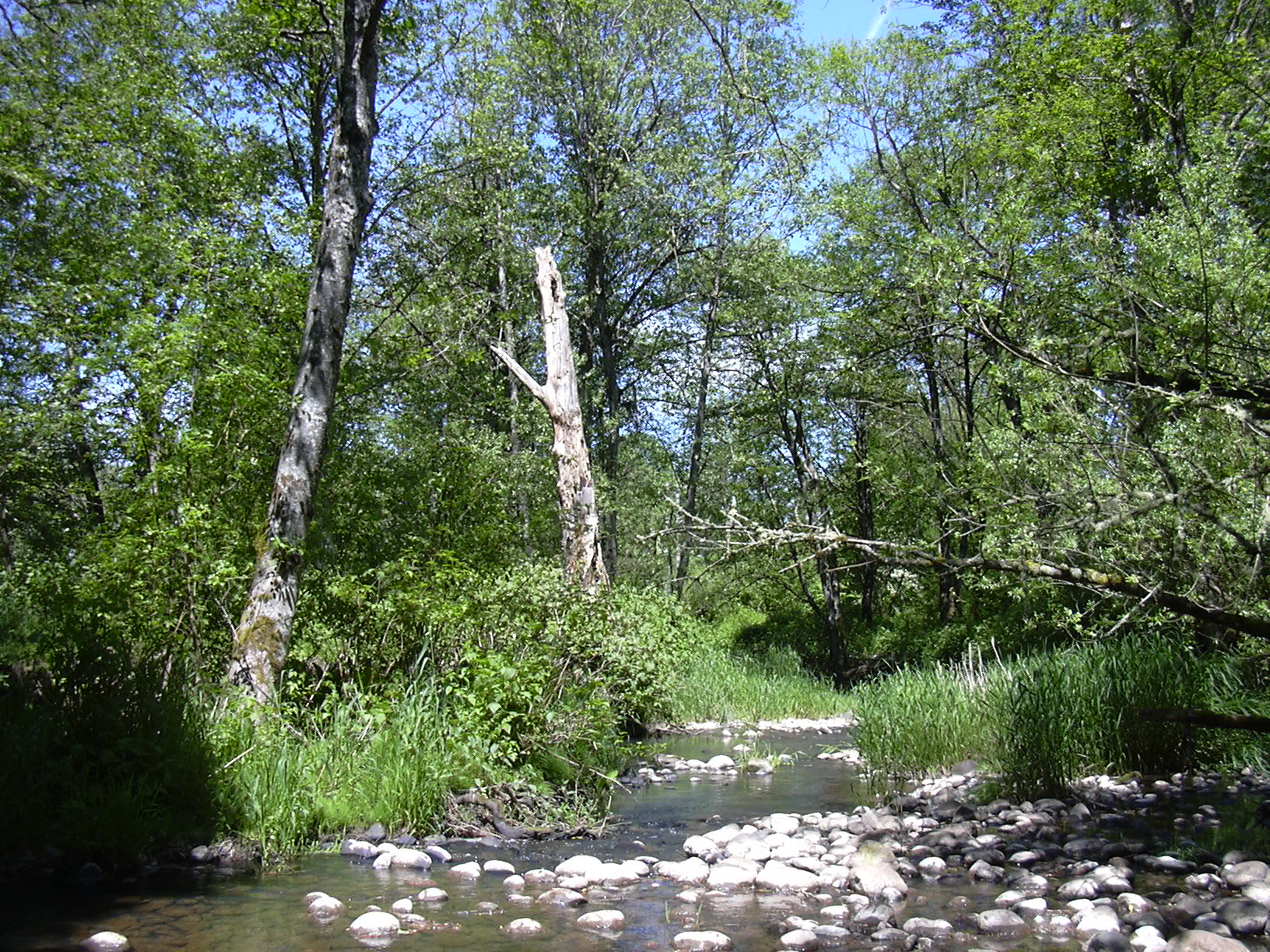
- Johnson Creek near Regner Road in Gresham

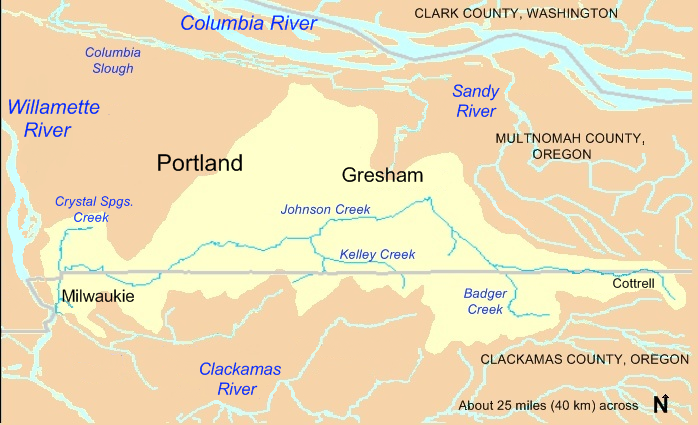
- Johnson Creek watershed

- Location of the mouth of Johnson Creek in Oregon
- Etymology: William Johnson, early settler

Location
- Country: United States
- State: Oregon
- County: Clackamas and Multnomah

Physical characteristics
- Source: Cascade Range foothills
  - location: near Cottrell, Clackamas County, Oregon
  - coordinates: 45°26′51″N 122°17′18″W
  - elevation: 745 ft (227 m) Elevation derived from Google Earth search using GNIS source coordinates
- Mouth: Willamette River
  - location: Milwaukie, Clackamas County, Oregon
  - coordinates: 45°26′39″N 122°38′36″W
  - elevation: 26 ft (7.9 m)
- Length: 25 mi (40 km)
- Basin size: 54 sq mi (140 km^{2})
- Discharge
  - location: Milwaukie, 0.7 miles (1.1 km) from mouth
  - average: 77.5 cu ft/s (2.19 m^{3}/s)
  - minimum: 9.3 cu ft/s (0.26 m^{3}/s)
  - maximum: 2,170 cu ft/s (61 m^{3}/s)
- Discharge
  - location: Gresham
  - average: 27 cu ft/s (0.76 m^{3}/s)

Johnson Creek is a 25-mile (40 km) tributary of the Willamette River in the Portland metropolitan area of the U.S. state of Oregon. Part of the drainage basin of the Columbia River, its catchment consists of 54 square miles (140 km^{2}) of mostly urban land occupied by about 180,000 people as of 2012. Passing through the cities of Gresham, Portland, and Milwaukie, the creek flows generally west from the foothills of the Cascade Range through sediments deposited by glacial floods on a substrate of basalt. Though polluted, it is free-flowing along its main stem and provides habitat for salmon and other migrating fish.

Prior to European settlement, the watershed was heavily forested and was used by Native Americans of the Chinook band for fishing and hunting. In the 19th century, non-Native American settlers cleared much of the land for farming, and the stream is named for one of these newcomers, William Johnson, who in 1846 built a water-powered sawmill along the creek. By the early 20th century, a rail line parallel to the stream encouraged further residential and commercial development. As urban density increased in the floodplain, seasonal floods grew more damaging. In the 1930s the Works Progress Administration of the federal government lined the lower 15 miles (24 km) of Johnson Creek with rock to control the floods. Despite this, the creek flooded 37 times between 1941 and 2006. Since the 1990s, regional planners have tried to reduce flooding by controlling stormwater runoff, creating stream meanders, reducing erosion, replacing impervious surfaces, and protecting riparian buffers.

The Johnson Creek watershed includes the subwatersheds of Badger Creek, Sunshine Creek, Kelley Creek, Mitchell Creek, Veterans Creek, Crystal Springs Creek, and smaller streams. Parks along the creek and its tributaries include natural areas, a wildlife refuge, a rhododendron garden, a botanical garden, and a 21-mile (34 km) bicycle and pedestrian rail trail that follows the creek for much of its length.

== Course ==
Johnson Creek begins near the unincorporated community of Cottrell in Clackamas County, Oregon, southeast of Gresham in the foothills of the Cascade Range, and flows generally westward about 25 miles (40 km) to its confluence with the Willamette River, a major tributary of the Columbia River. The creek passes through the cities of Gresham, Portland, and Milwaukie and crosses the border between Clackamas County and Multnomah County eight times.

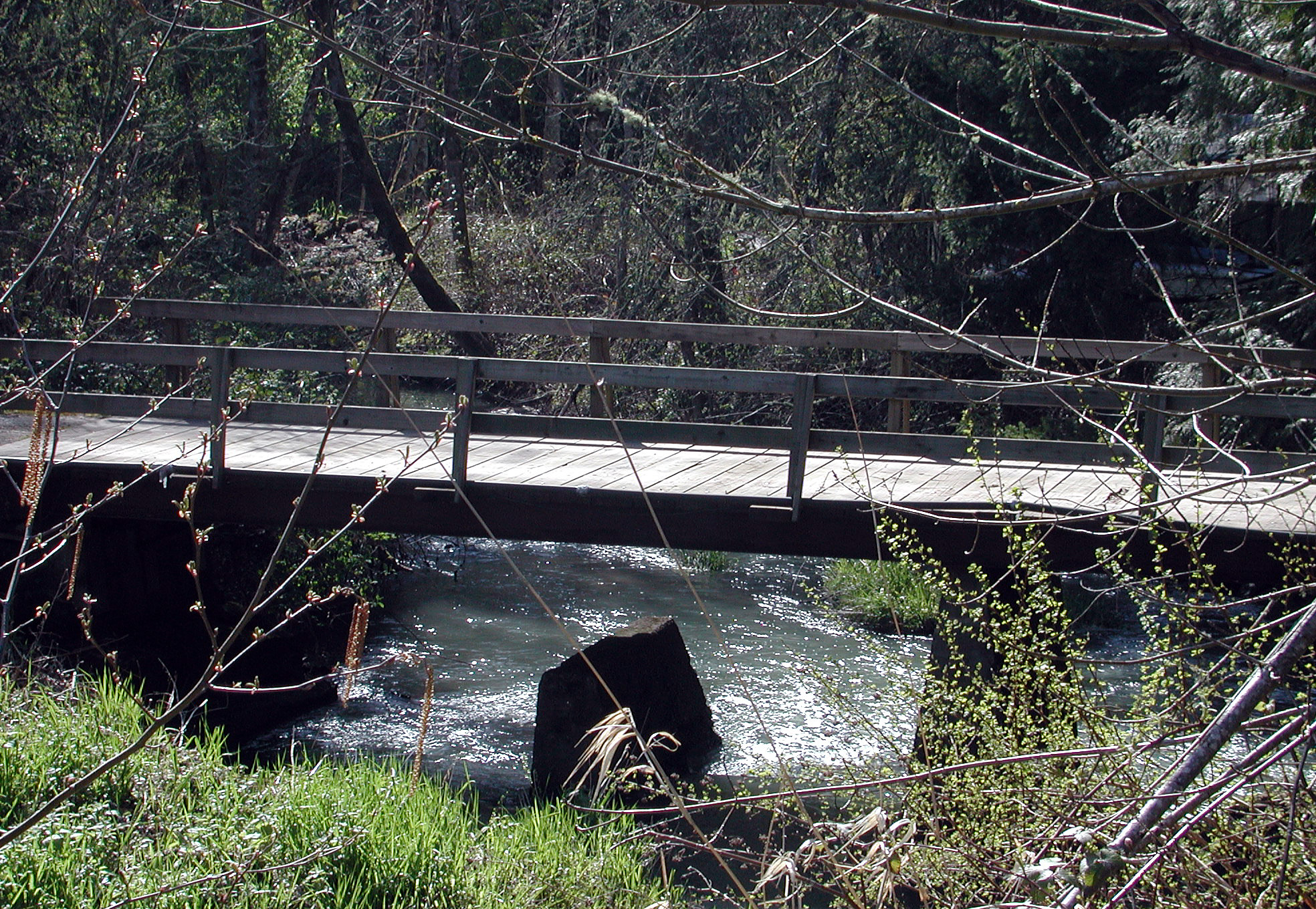
A footbridge crosses Johnson Creek near Regner Road in Gresham.

For much of its course, the creek flows at almost right angles to the numbered avenues of southeast Portland and its eastern suburbs. As the creek descends, so do the avenue numbers. The creek begins in uplands in Clackamas County east of Southeast 362nd Avenue and flows swiftly to the west for about 5 miles (8 km), crisscrossing the border between Clackamas County and Multnomah County 5 times in this upstream stretch, and passing under U.S. Route 26, the Mount Hood Highway, in Multnomah County at about 20 miles (32 km) from the mouth. Shortly thereafter, it receives Badger Creek and Sunshine Creek from the left and the North Fork of Johnson Creek from the right.

Turning sharply, Johnson Creek flows swiftly northwest for about 3 miles (5 km), entering Gresham and shortly thereafter passing the United States Geological Survey (USGS) gauge at Regner Road, 16.2 miles (26.1 km) from the mouth. Soon the creek enters Main City Park in Gresham, where it again turns sharply and flows slightly south of west. Here the slope flattens, and the stream runs more slowly for the next third of its course. Slightly west of Main City Park, it passes the Gresham Pioneer Cemetery. Just beyond the cemetery, it receives Butler Creek on the left, enters Portland at about 13 miles (21 km) from the mouth, and receives Kelley Creek on the left shortly thereafter. Mitchell Creek, a major tributary of Kelley Creek, enters Kelley Creek about 0.5 miles (0.8 km) south of Johnson Creek. Shortly thereafter, Johnson Creek passes the USGS gauge station at Sycamore, 10.2 miles (16.4 km) from the mouth, and flows under Cedar Crossing Bridge.

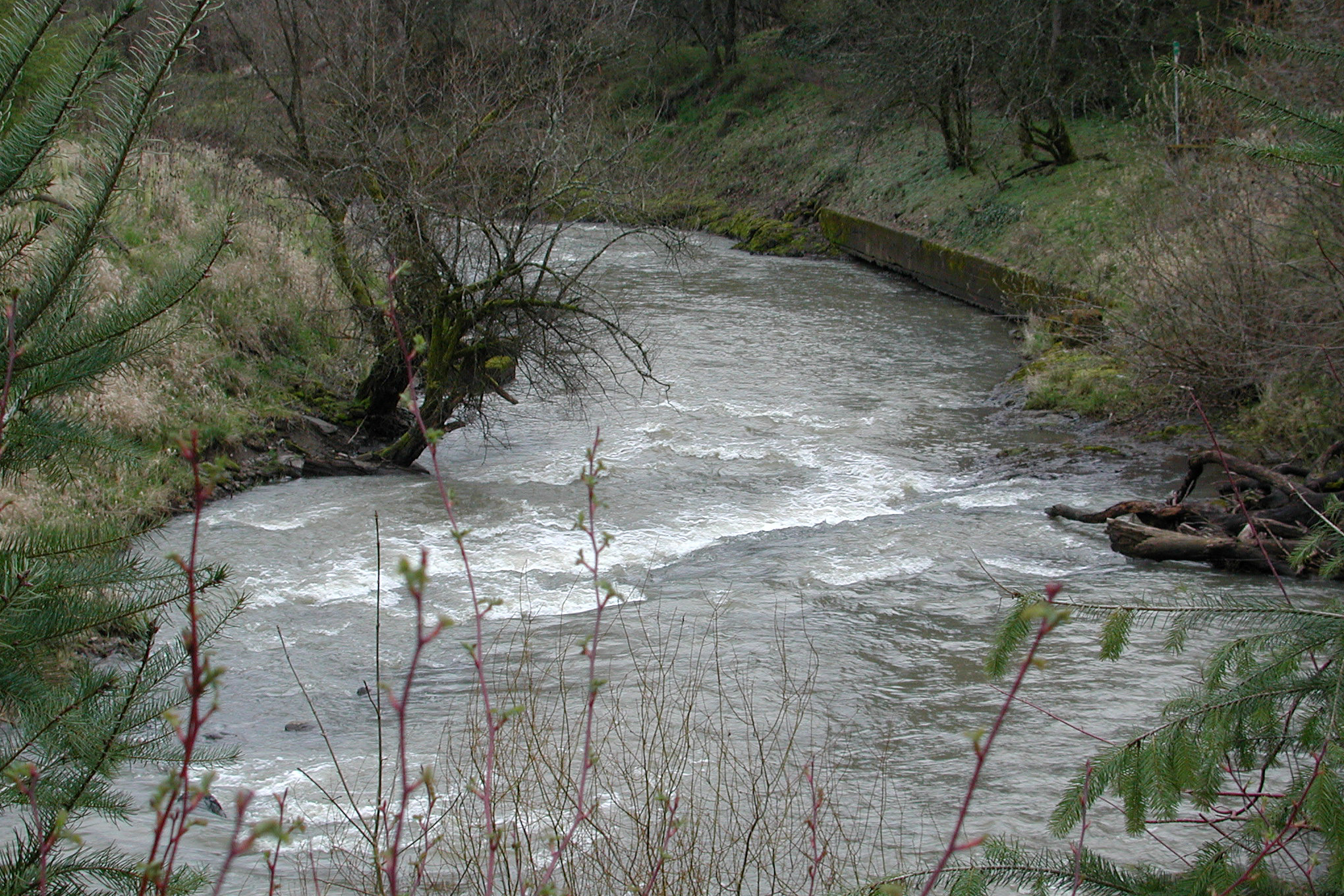
Johnson Creek near mouth in Milwaukie

Meandering slowly through the Lents neighborhood of Portland, Johnson Creek receives Veterans Creek, which enters on the left from its headwaters in Happy Valley in Clackamas County. Johnson Creek passes under Interstate 205, and shortly thereafter begins to flow more swiftly again at Southeast 82nd Avenue, about 8 miles (13 km) from the mouth. It then makes its sixth and seventh county-border crossings, dipping briefly into Clackamas County and back north into Multnomah County, and then runs near the border between Portland and Milwaukie along Johnson Creek Boulevard for about 2 miles (3.2 km). After passing under Oregon Route 99E (Southeast McLoughlin Boulevard) in Portland's Sellwood neighborhood, the creek turns sharply south about 1.5 miles (2.4 km) from the mouth.

At Southeast 21st Avenue, it receives Crystal Springs Creek, which enters on the right. This tributary, 2.7 miles (4.3 km) long, begins on the Reed College campus, flows under the Blue Bridge in Reed Canyon, through the Crystal Springs Rhododendron Garden, and generally south to Johnson Creek. From its confluence with Crystal Springs Creek, Johnson Creek flows south about 1 mile (1.6 km), crossing the county border for the eighth and final time. After re-entering Clackamas County, it passes the USGS gauge station at Milwaukie, 0.7 miles (1.1 km) from the mouth. Shortly thereafter, Johnson Creek empties into the Willamette River 18.5 miles (29.8 km) above its confluence with the Columbia River, which in turn flows about another 100 miles (160 km) to the Pacific Ocean at Astoria.

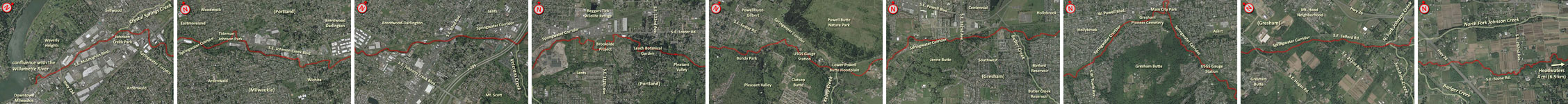
Map of Johnson Creek's route through the urban neighborhoods. The route has been artificially straightened by orienting each of the panels differently. The compass marks north for each. (Zoom in)

== Watershed ==
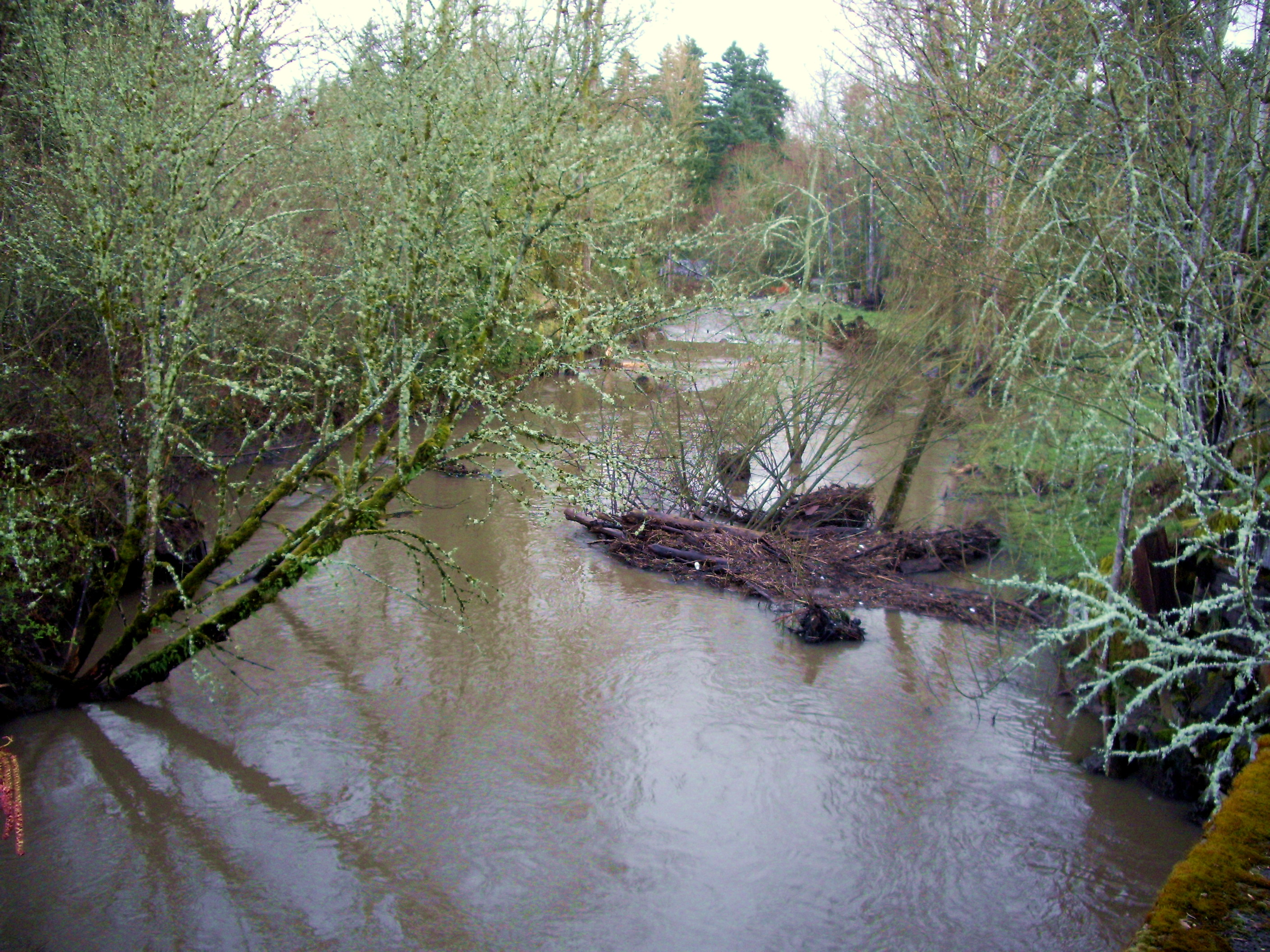
Johnson Creek enters Tideman Johnson Park at Southeast 41st Avenue.

=== Geology and topography ===
The floodplain of Johnson Creek is a remnant of large glacial floods known as the Missoula Floods that deposited thick sediments between 18,000 and 13,000 years ago in the Columbia River Basin, including much of the Willamette Valley. Underlying the sediments are substantial thicknesses of basalt lavas from the Columbia River Basalt Group. The lava, exposed mainly in the uplands, has been folded and faulted to form a series of sub-basins, including the Johnson Creek watershed.

The watershed is a roughly rectangular area of about 54 square miles (140 km^{2}). The topography of the watershed varies greatly from the high point of about 1,100 feet (335 m) above sea level in the Boring Hills near the creek's source to the low point of 26 feet (8 m) where the creek meets the Willamette River.

Slopes in the watershed range generally between 1 and 25 percent. Mount Scott and Powell Butte rise to about 1,000 feet (305 m) and have slopes ranging from 10 to 30 percent. Gresham Butte and Hogan Butte, in Gresham, have the steepest slopes, including a few around 50 percent. The Boring Hills, of volcanic origin, rise more than 800 feet (244 m) higher than the terraces to the north and west. The Kelso Slope, a northwest-sloping dissected surface west of the canyon of the Sandy River, tilts down from about 1,000 feet (305 m) above sea level near Sandy to about 400 feet (122 m) above sea level east of Gresham.

Formed by the ancestral Columbia and Willamette Rivers, the terraces north of Johnson Creek are generally underlain by permeable sand and gravel. Three isolated hills—Rocky Butte, Mount Tabor, and Kelly Butte—rise about 200 to 400 feet (61 to 122 m) above the surrounding terraces. Except for Powell Butte, the terrain on the creek's north side is less steep than on the south side, which includes Mount Scott and the Boring Lava Domes.

The eastern half of the watershed is more open and rural than the urban western half, which consists largely of residential areas with pockets of commerce and industry. An estimated 180,000 people lived in the watershed as of 2012.

=== Soils ===
The potential for soil erosion varies throughout the watershed. Erosion is not a big threat in the northwestern part of the watershed, where the land is flat and developed, or in the northeast, dominated by low-erosion soils. In the southeast, soils have a medium risk of erosion, and soils around Powell Butte and the Boring Lava Domes have "an extremely high erodibility factor and are sensitive to ground disturbance".

The watershed's soils vary in their permeability and ability to retain water. Clays that do not absorb much water dominate the eastern end of the watershed and the lands south of the creek. Northern areas of the watershed tend to be porous and less prone to rapid runoff.

=== Hydrology ===
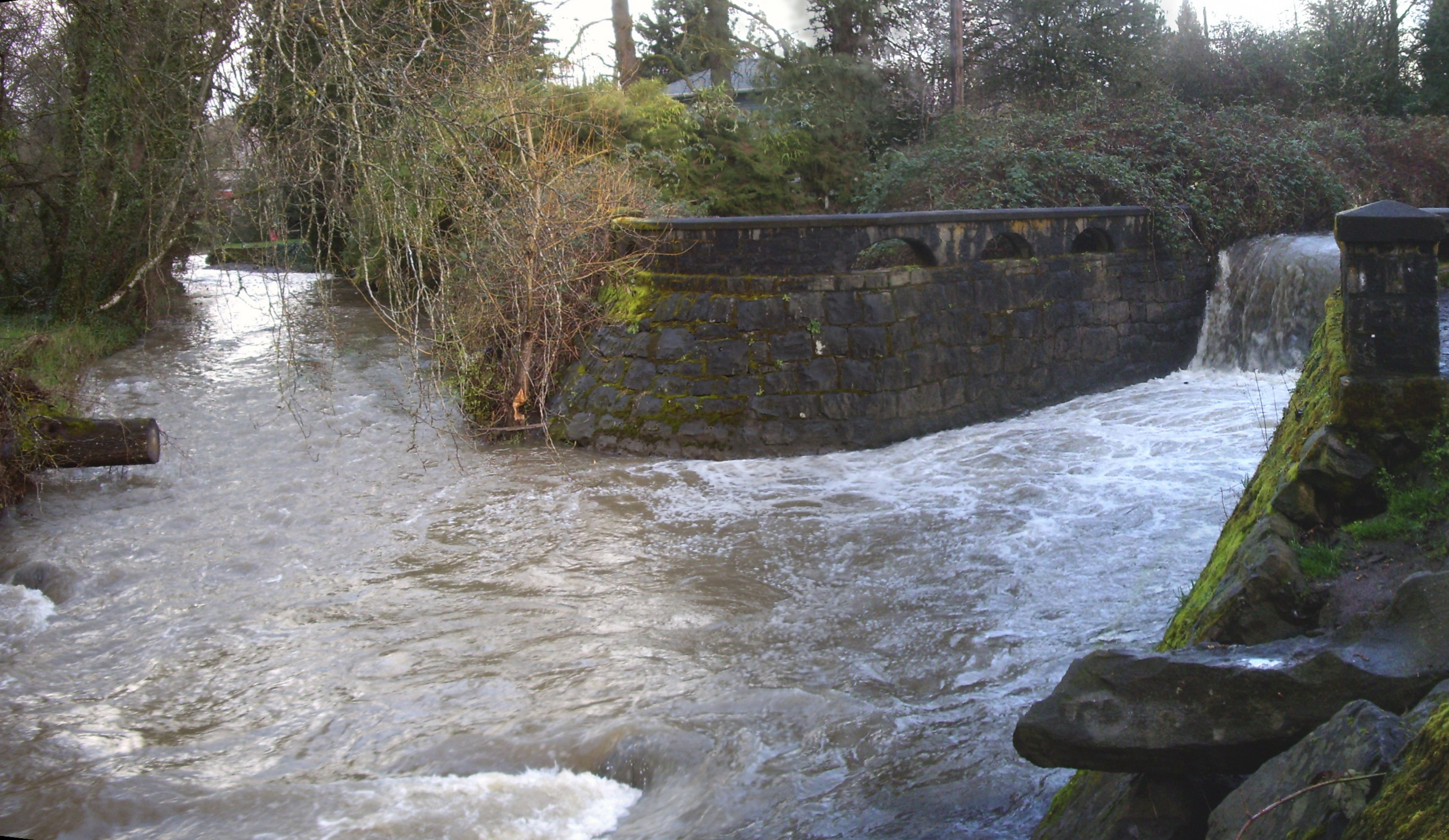
Lower Johnson Creek rejoins itself after forming a small island near Southeast 42nd Avenue.

The watershed can be divided into two hydrologic areas with different infiltration rates. The northern area, comprising about 40 percent of the watershed, consists of the Portland Terraces, and the southern consists of the Boring Hills and the Kelso Slope. Most of the rain that falls on the northern area percolates into the ground, and most of the rain that falls on the southern area runs quickly into the creek or its tributaries. Rain that falls on the north generally has a more gradual, longer-lasting effect, sustaining the base flow of the creek during dry periods.

About 40 percent of the tributaries that originally flowed over the surface of the watershed were piped or relocated during urban development, especially on the north side of the main stem. Generally, the remaining free-flowing tributaries begin south of the main stem and run north; the major exception is Crystal Springs Creek, which begins as a groundwater discharge and flows south. The other major tributaries are Hogan, Kelley, Butler, Sunshine, and Badger creeks. Crystal Springs and Kelley creeks contribute more flow to the main stem than the other tributaries.

Fill at Foster Road and Southeast 111th Avenue usually prevents stormwater runoff from a 9-square-mile (23 km^{2}) area of the watershed in the Lents and Powellhurst-Gilbert neighborhoods from flowing directly into the creek. Instead, runoff is routed to sumps, where it percolates into the ground. Normal drainage patterns have also been altered further downstream in the Sellwood, Eastmoreland, Westmoreland, and Woodstock neighborhoods, where runoff flows into the Portland sewer system instead of into the creek.

=== Jurisdiction ===
Six local political jurisdictions overlap with the Johnson Creek watershed. In 2000, 38 percent of the watershed was in Portland's city limits, 24 percent in unincorporated Clackamas County, 23 percent in Gresham, 11 percent in unincorporated Multnomah County, 4 percent in Milwaukie, and 0.1 percent in Happy Valley. None of the cities lies entirely within the watershed. In 2000, Johnson Creek and its tributaries drained 53 percent of Gresham, 42 percent of Milwaukie, 19 percent of Happy Valley, and 14 percent of Portland. The watershed covered only 1.2 percent of unincorporated Multnomah County and less than 1 percent of unincorporated Clackamas County.

Neighboring watersheds on the east side of the Willamette River include Mount Scott Creek and Kellogg Creek, which flow through Milwaukie and drain directly into the Willamette; the Clackamas River, which drains the southeast suburbs and empties into the Willamette near Oregon City; the Sandy River, which drains the eastern suburbs and empties into the Columbia; and Fairview Creek and the Columbia Slough, which drain north Portland and Gresham, emptying into the Columbia.

19th-century maps also show numerous springs and small streams flowing into a wetland that covered an area of today's southeast Portland between Powell Boulevard (U.S. Route 26) and Johnson Creek, a distance of 2.25 miles (3.62 km). Though most of the wetland complex has been filled in and built upon, remnants exist at the Crystal Springs Rhododendron Garden on Crystal Springs Creek. Old maps also show two streams flowing into a slough that drained part of the wetland. One flowed through the Clinton Street neighborhood, about six city blocks north of Powell Boulevard, and the other drained the Colonial Heights neighborhood, slightly further north near Ladd's Addition. These streams and most others in this area were diverted into the city sewer system and no longer appear on the surface. A Johnson Creek near Hoyt Arboretum on the west side of the Willamette River in Portland has no relationship to the Johnson Creek on the east side.

=== Volunteer group ===
The Johnson Creek Watershed Council (JCWC) is a nonprofit group organized in 1995 to protect the creek and its watershed. Its projects involve such things as controlling invasive species, planting native riparian vegetation, improving fish passage, and creating off-channel flood storage. JCWC's fish passage barrier program focuses on removing or improving fish passage barriers such as culverts. The council is heavily dependent on volunteers for watershed riparian restoration activities such as planting native plants, and in their Community Science program, where volunteers collect data on wildlife in the watershed. In 2011 alone, more than a thousand volunteers donated 5,500 hours of their time to JCWC activities.

=== Annual report card ===
In 2015, Portland's Bureau of Environmental Services (BES) began issuing annual "report cards" for watersheds or fractions thereof that lie within the city. BES assigns grades for each of four categories: hydrology, water quality, habitat, and fish and wildlife. Hydrology grades depend on the amount of pavement and other impervious surfaces in the watershed and to what degree its streams flow freely, not dammed or diverted. Water-quality grades are based on measurements of dissolved oxygen, E-coli bacteria, temperature, suspended solids, and substances such as mercury and phosphorus. Habitat ranking depends on the condition of stream banks and floodplains, riparian zones, tree canopies, and other variables. The fish and wildlife assessment includes birds, fish, and macroinvertebrates. In 2015, the BES grades for Johnson Creek are hydrology, B+; water quality, C+; habitat, C, and fish and wildlife, D+. For the 2019 report, grades were comparable, despite improvement efforts: hydrology, A−; water quality, C; habitat, C, and fish and wildlife, D−.

== History ==
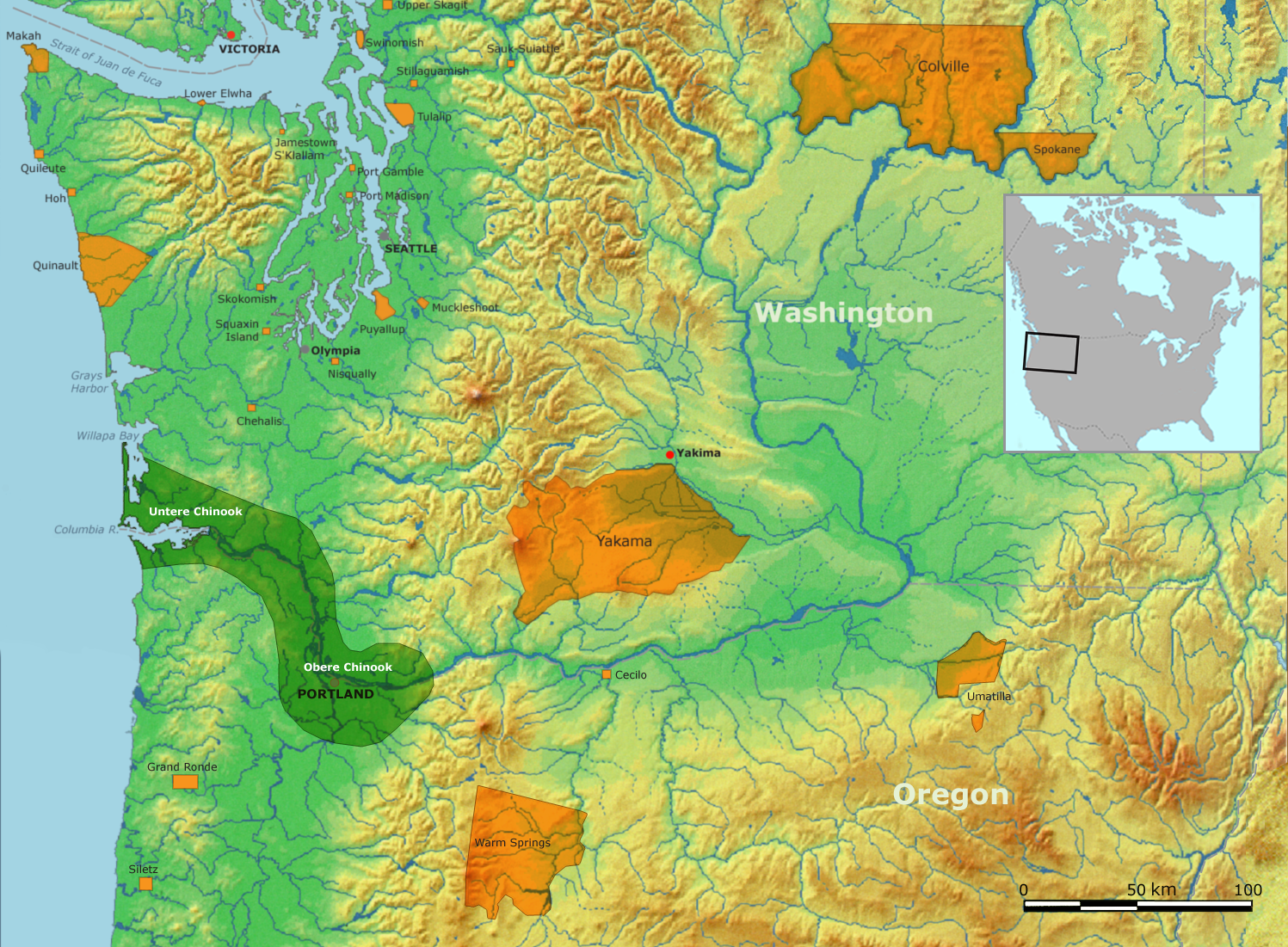
Indian reservations in Washington state shown in orange. Traditional Chinook tribal territory shown in dark green in the lower Columbia River basin, including Johnson Creek.

Before settlers moved into the basin, it consisted mainly of upland and wetland forests in which Native Americans fished, hunted, and foraged. Evidence suggests that people lived in the northern Oregon Cascade Range as early as 10,000 years ago. By 2,000 to 3,000 years ago, settlements in the Clackamas River basin, adjacent to the Johnson Creek watershed, had moved to the river's lower floodplain. The area was the home of the Clackamas Indians, a subgroup of the Chinookan speakers who lived in the Columbia River Valley from Celilo Falls to the Pacific Ocean. The Clackamas lands included the lower Willamette River from Willamette Falls at what became Oregon City to its confluence with the Columbia River and reached into the foothills of the Cascades. When Lewis and Clark visited the area in 1806, the Clackamas tribe consisted of about 1,800 people living in 11 villages. Epidemics of smallpox, malaria, and measles reduced this population to 88 by 1851, and in 1855 the tribe signed a treaty surrendering its lands, including Johnson Creek.

By the middle of the 19th century, the European American newcomers had begun to remove vegetation, build sawmills, fell trees, fill wetlands, and farm in the fertile soil along Johnson Creek. The creek is named for one of these newcomers, William Johnson, who in 1846 settled in what later became the Lents neighborhood of Portland and operated a water-powered sawmill. In early 1848 Lot Whitcomb, who would later found Milwaukie, filed a donation land claim and built a sawmill near the confluence of Johnson Creek and the Willamette River. In 1886, plans were made for train tracks along the creek. In 1903, the Springwater Division Line, also known as the Portland Traction Company Line, the Cazadero Line, and the Bellrose Line, was built along Johnson Creek to provide rail transport for passengers and freight. Sellwood, Eastmoreland, Lents, and Pleasant Valley were among the new communities that grew up along the line. By the 1920s, housing began to replace creekside farms. In the 1960s, the Oregon state government and Multnomah County proposed construction of a freeway along the creek connecting the Sellwood Bridge to Interstate 205.

== Floods ==
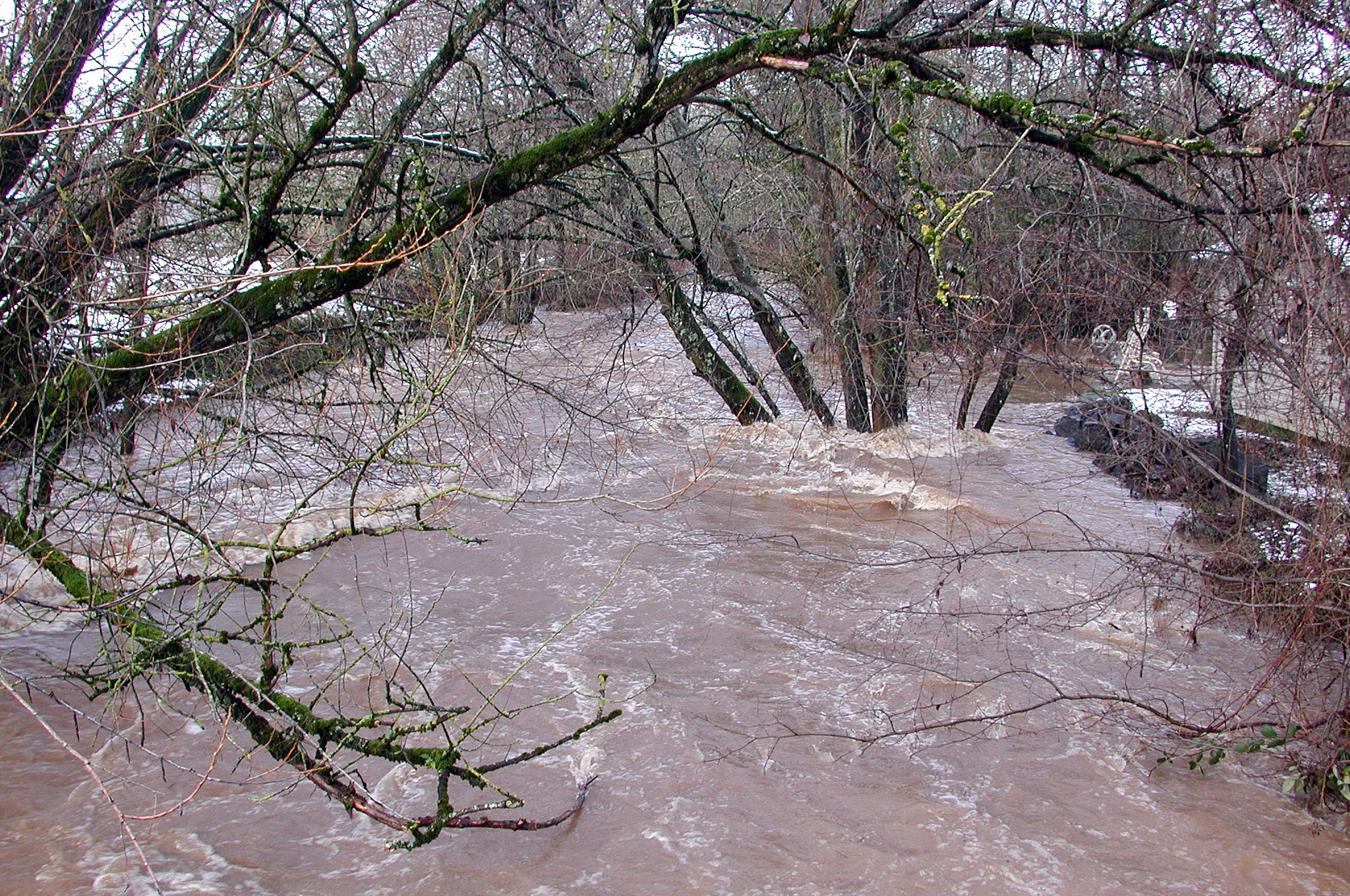
Johnson Creek during flood at Southeast 45th Avenue, January 2009

By removing the original vegetation, rural and urban development of the Johnson Creek watershed induced more rapid storm runoff and destructive floods. As a flood-control measure in the 1930s, the Works Progress Administration of the federal government cleared and lined with rock about 90 percent of the creek between its mouth and Southeast 158th Avenue, about 15 miles (24 km) from the mouth, creating an artificial channel 6–10 feet (2–3 m) deep and 25–50 feet (8–15 m) wide. Although substantially altering the stream and its aquatic life, this channel failed to prevent overflows, the largest of which damaged 1,200 structures in 1964.

Precipitation patterns in the Johnson Creek watershed have contributed to frequent high flows and floods along the creek, typically between November and February. Based on records from 1961 to 1990, Portland's average annual precipitation, as measured at Portland International Airport along the Columbia River, is about 36 inches (910 mm). About 21 inches (530 mm) falls from November through February and only about 5 inches (130 mm) from June through September. The airport, at about 30 feet (9 m) above sea level, is at essentially the same elevation as the mouth of Johnson Creek. Annual precipitation at higher elevations in the creek's upper watershed is much greater, more than 70 inches (1,800 mm).

The floods primarily affect four areas in Portland: Tideman Johnson Natural Area at Southeast 45th Avenue, the area west of Southeast 82nd Avenue; Lents, and lower Powell Butte. The U.S. National Weather Service defines Johnson Creek's flood stage, measured at USGS station 14211500 at Sycamore in Portland, as 11 feet (3.4 m), equivalent to a flow rate (discharge rate) of about 1,200 cubic feet (34 m^{3}) per second. The USGS peak streamflow data collected by the stream gauge at that station show that the creek reached or exceeded 1,200 cubic feet (34 m^{3}) per second 37 times between 1941 and 2006; that is 37 floods in 65 years. Twenty of those floods exceeded 1,500 cubic feet (42 m^{3}) per second. At least seven of the floods caused major property damage. A more recent overflow occurred in December 2007, when the creek crested at 1.5 feet (0.46 m) above flood stage. Between 1978 and 1997, flood insurance claims totaling an estimated $2 million were paid for damage along the creek.

The biggest flood measured at Sycamore, 10.2 miles (16.4 km) from the mouth of the creek, occurred in 2015. Exceeding the official flood stage of 11 feet (3.4 m) by more than 4 feet (1.2 m), the creek reached 15.33 feet (4.67 m) on December 7 of that year. The second-highest level,15.30 feet (4.66 m), occurred in November 1996, followed by the Christmas flood of 1964 on December 22, when the creek reached 14.68 feet (4.47 m) at Sycamore.

As of 2008, the USGS was monitoring Johnson Creek at Regner Road in Gresham, 16.3 miles (26.2 km) from the mouth, and at Milwaukie, 0.7 miles (1.1 km) from the mouth, as well as at Sycamore. It also had stream-monitor stations on Kelley Creek and Crystal Springs Creek. The Sycamore station was the oldest, having begun operation in 1941.

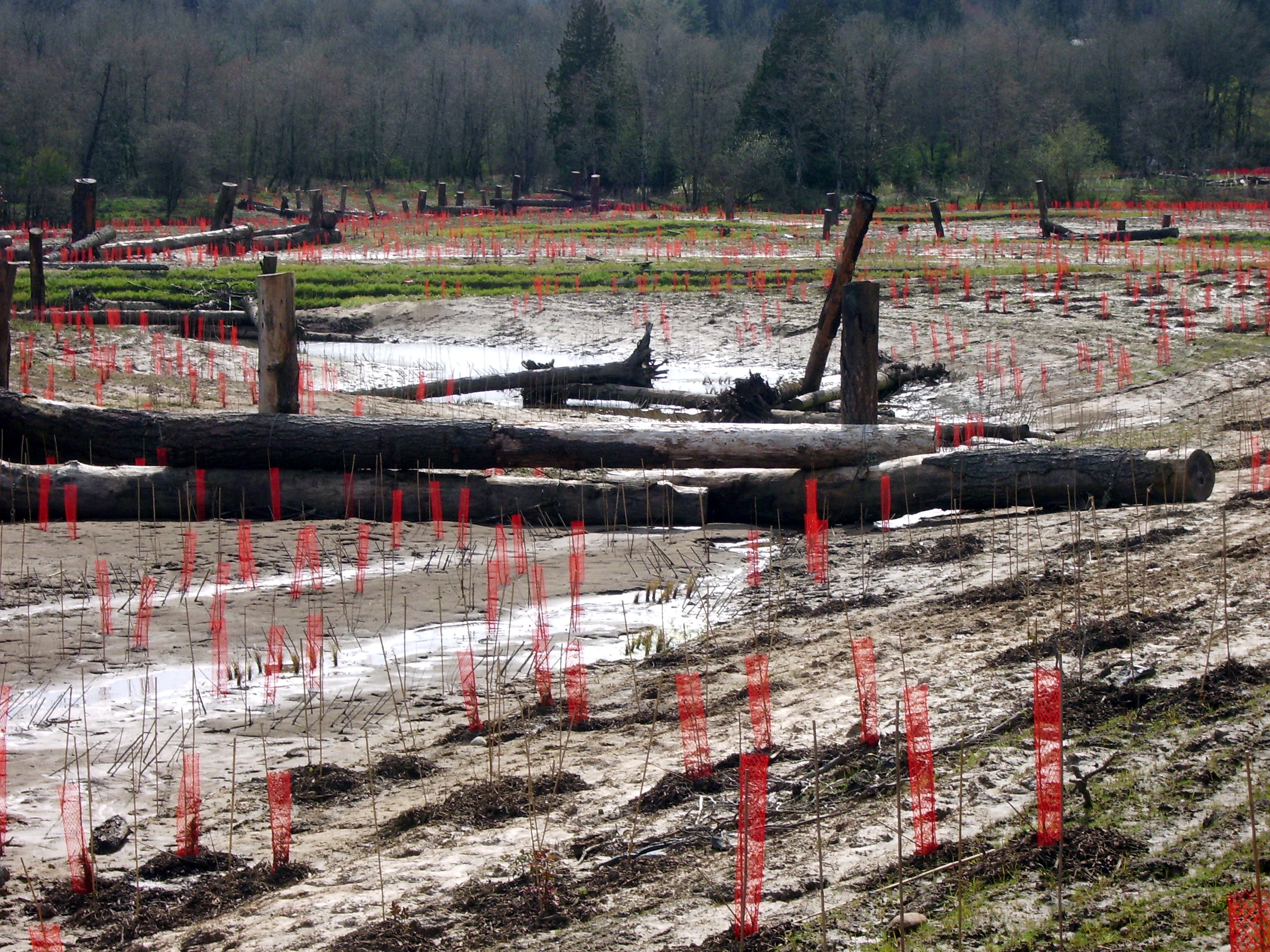
A bioswale along Johnson Creek near Southeast 164th Avenue restores flood-control functions to former cow pasture. The red tubes protect new seedlings.

Proposals by agencies such as Metro, the regional government of the Portland metropolitan area, and the U.S. Army Corps of Engineers in the 1970s and 1980s to control Johnson Creek flooding were abandoned after groups of residents objected to every proposal. In 1990, the City of Portland formed the Johnson Creek Corridor Committee from multiple agencies and citizen groups with varied interests related to the watershed. Led by the city's Bureau of Environmental Services, the combined groups in 2001 produced the Johnson Creek Restoration Plan to reduce flooding, improve water quality, and improve fish and wildlife habitat. Goals varied from section to section along the creek and included controlling storm water runoff, reducing erosion, replacing or mitigating impervious surfaces, and protecting riparian zones. Through 2007, at least 75 site-specific restoration projects had been carried out in the Johnson Creek Watershed, ranging from the $1.2 million Brookside Project, a constructed wetland, to small riparian repair projects. Most involved voluntary citizen participation in all phases, including the long-term management and care of the sites. In late 2012, the city completed the East Lents Floodplain Project, which restored 70 acres (28 ha) of the natural floodplain to a low-lying area along the creek.

== Pollution ==
The Oregon Department of Environmental Quality (DEQ) rated Johnson Creek's water quality between 1986 and 1995 as "very poor". Monitoring the creek 0.2 miles (0.3 km) from the mouth, it recorded very high concentrations of nitrates and high concentrations of phosphates. Fecal coliform bacteria, total solids, and biochemical oxygen demand also impaired water quality. These conditions occurred throughout the year, and results for each parameter fell into the "very poor" category. On the Oregon Water Quality Index (OWQI) used by DEQ, water quality scores can vary from 10 (worst) to 100 (ideal). The minimal seasonal average for Johnson Creek on this scale was 26, the second worst in the lower Willamette basin. By comparison, the minimal seasonal average in the nearby Willamette River at the Hawthorne Bridge in downtown Portland was 74 during the same years. Studies suggest that most pollutants of Johnson Creek do not come from point sources but are washed off urban and rural land surfaces during storms.

High temperatures cause problems for aquatic life throughout the watershed. The Oregon standard for maximum temperatures conducive to salmonid rearing in the Willamette Basin is 17.8 °C (64.0 °F), and data show that the mean maximum summertime temperatures in Johnson Creek exceed this standard. The maximum temperature that Coho salmon can survive for short periods is 24 °C (75 °F). Thermographs at several locations on Johnson Creek in 1992 recorded maximum average weekly water temperatures higher than 18 °C (64 °F) in June, July, and August, and an absolute maximum temperature of 24 °C (75 °F).

Studies conducted by DEQ, USGS, the City of Gresham, and other public agencies have identified DDT (dichloro-diphenyl-trichloroethane), dieldrin, polychlorinated biphenyls (PCB), chlordane, and polycyclic aromatic hydrocarbons (PAH) as carcinogenic pollutants of Johnson Creek. The creek has been classified as a "waterbody of concern" by the DEQ because of elevated levels of copper, chromium, and nickel in water and sediments. Generally, metal concentrations increase downstream.

== Biology ==
=== Macroinvertebrates and fish ===
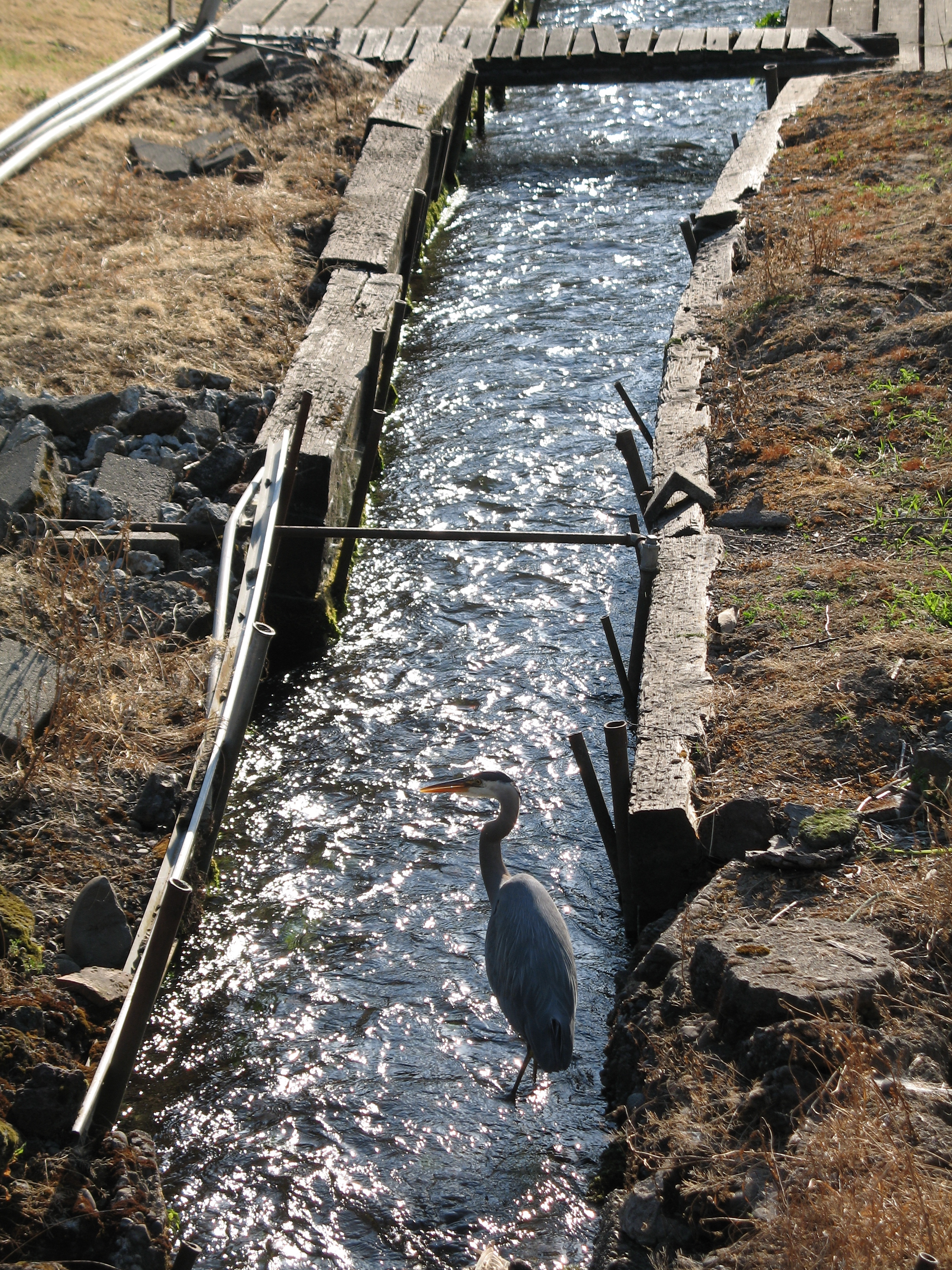
A great blue heron wades in Crystal Springs Creek near Reed College.

A study conducted in 1999 for the City of Portland by researchers from Portland State University found that Johnson Creek had marginal conditions for macroinvertebrates, an important source of food for fish and other aquatic life. The study compared differences in these life forms and in water chemistry from two urban streams, Johnson Creek and Tryon Creek in southwest Portland, with two nearby rural streams and found that benthic communities in the urban streams were degraded compared to the regional reference creeks.

Most fish species in Johnson Creek tolerate warm water and disturbed conditions. These include red-sided shiners, sculpin, suckers, and speckled dace.

Large populations of salmon inhabited the creek before urban construction altered the watershed and the stream channel, and in the 21st century, the creek and its tributaries still provide habitat for smaller numbers of chinook and coho salmon, steelhead, and coastal cutthroat trout. Steelhead populations in Johnson Creek are within the Lower Columbia River steelhead distinct population segment and listed as threatened (2011). Chinook and coho salmon are listed as threatened as part of the Lower Columbia River Evolutionary Significant Unit (2011).

=== Wildlife ===
Before the area became urban, large mammals including bobcats, black bears, foxes, cougars, wolves, and elk thrived in the area. Common species in the 21st century include crow, robin, starling, song sparrow, Bewick's wren, house finch, cedar waxwing, violet-green swallow, belted kingfisher, great blue heron, mallard, wood duck, bushtit, black-capped chickadee, raccoon, opossum, nutria, and moles. Less developed areas support black-tailed deer, coyotes, deer mice, voles, bats, western flycatchers, black-headed grosbeaks, orange-crowned warblers, common mergansers, and woodpeckers. Other wildlife in the watershed include beaver, river otter, freshwater mussels, and bald eagles. Johnson Creek and its watershed are home to life forms that, under Oregon law, have been listed as "sensitive" species. These are naturally reproducing native animals that may become threatened or endangered throughout all or any significant part of their range in Oregon. Such animals known to live in the Johnson Creek watershed include long-toed, northwestern, and Columbia salamanders, red-legged frogs, painted turtles, great horned owls, toads, hawks, and coyotes. A plant found on Powell Butte, tall bugbane (Actaea elata), is also listed as a sensitive species.

=== Vegetation ===
The watershed lies in the Willamette Valley ecoregion designated by the U.S. Environmental Protection Agency (EPA). It was covered until the mid-19th century with Oregon ash, red alder, and western redcedar forests and scattered black cottonwood groves in riparian areas. Douglas-fir and Oregon white oak grew in the uplands. About 57 percent of the watershed is covered with plant life, including grass, trees, and all other forms of vegetation. As of 2000, about 70 percent of the watershed lay within the urban growth boundary. Of the total land area, 57 percent is single-family residential, 12 percent multi-family, 10 percent commercial, 8 percent rural, and 13 percent parks and open space. In 2000, about half of the rural agricultural total in the watershed consisted of cultivated crops or pasture, while tree farms and ornamental nurseries made up about 30 percent.

Creek restoration projects since the 1990s have reduced the amount of Himalayan blackberry, an invasive species that had come to dominate much of the landscape near the creek. New plantings include native shrubs and trees such as red-osier dogwood, elderberry, Indian plum, and willow. City parks adjacent to Johnson Creek have areas devoted to marsh with shrubs, cattails, and smartweed, forested wetland, riparian woodland, open meadow, and orchard trees.

== Parks ==
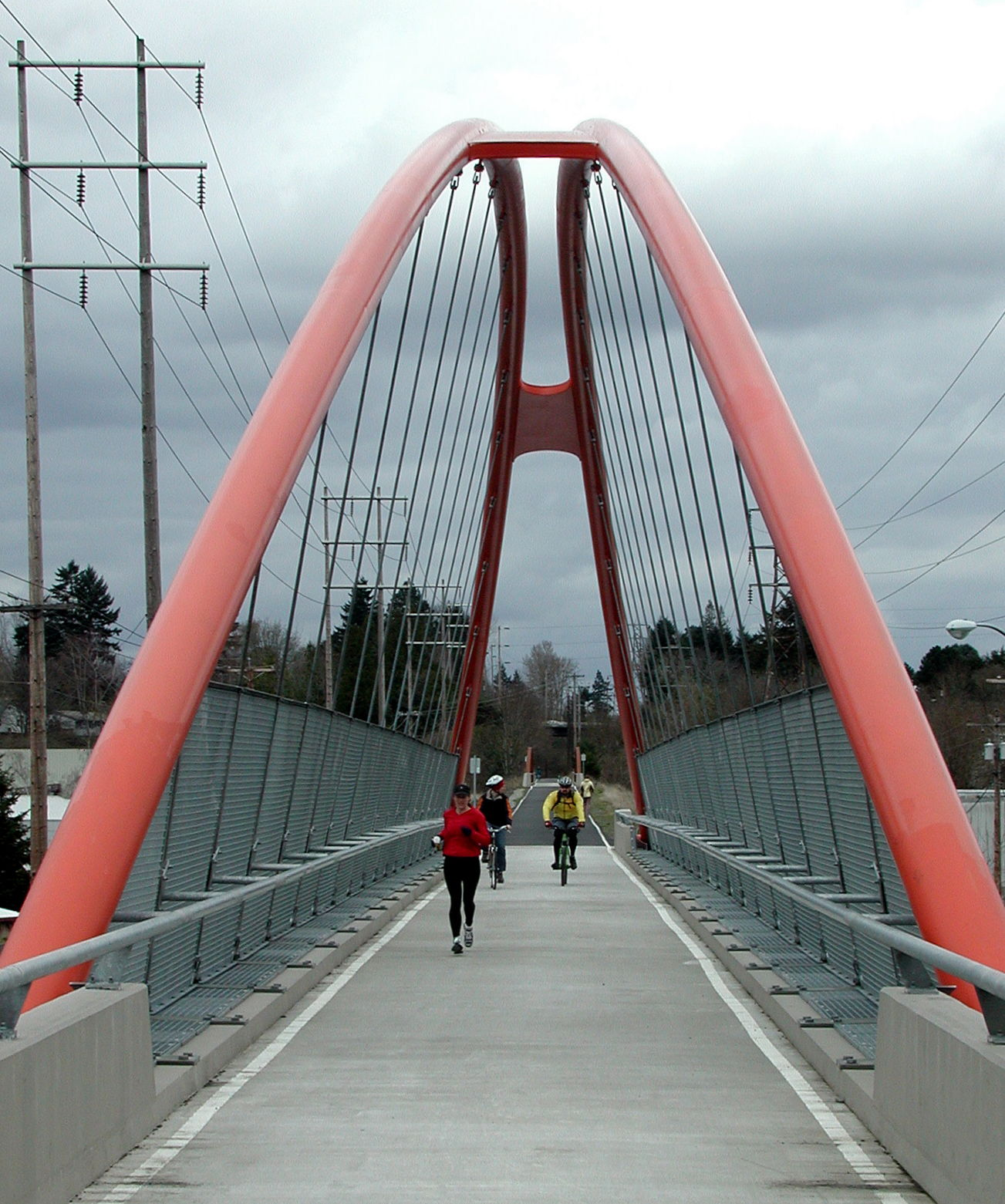
A pedestrian bridge crosses Oregon Route 99E, Southeast McLoughlin Boulevard, on the Springwater Corridor Trail along Johnson Creek.

By 1960, use of the rail line along Johnson Creek had declined and passenger service was discontinued. By 1990, the City of Portland bought much of the corridor. Working with Metro, it created the Springwater Corridor Trail, a 21-mile (34 km) bicycle and pedestrian rail trail that follows the creek and extends from the Willamette River to Boring. It became part of the 40-Mile Loop, a hiking and biking trail that circles the Portland metropolitan area and intersects with similar trails.

Creekside parks include Johnson Creek Park, about 4.5 acres (18,000 m^{2}) of natural areas and paths; the Crystal Springs Rhododendron Garden, along Crystal Springs Creek; Tideman Johnson Natural Area, about 7.2 acres (29,000 m^{2}) of natural areas and paths; Leach Botanical Garden, about 16 acres (65,000 m^{2}), a public garden dedicated to the study of botany and horticulture with an emphasis on plants of the Pacific Northwest; Beggars Tick Wildlife Refuge, a wetland of 20 acres (81,000 m^{2}); Foster Floodplains Natural Area, a reclaimed floodplain 63 acres (0.25 km^{2}) in area; Powell Butte Nature Park, about 608 acres (2.46 km^{2}) on an extinct cinder cone volcano, including natural areas and hiking, biking, and equestrian trails; and Gresham's Main City Park, about 18 acres (73,000 m^{2}) including sports fields, picnic areas, and trails.

In 2007, Metro bought two parcels of land totaling 102 acres (410,000 m^{2}) for preservation adjacent to Johnson Creek on Clatsop Butte, south of Foster Road near Powell Butte and Portland's Pleasant Valley neighborhood. The purchases cost $10.9 million, drawing on bonds approved by a 2006 ballot measure. They were praised by conservationists but questioned by others who thought Metro had paid too much.

== See also ==
- List of rivers of Oregon

== Sources ==
- Allan, Stuart; Buckley, Aileen R.; Meacham, James E. (2001) [1976]. Loy, William G. (ed.). Atlas of Oregon (2nd ed.). Eugene, Oregon: University of Oregon Press. ISBN 0-87114-101-9.
- Johnson Creek Watershed Council (2003). "Johnson Creek Watershed Action Plan: An Adaptive Approach" (PDF). Portland, Oregon: Johnson Creek Watershed Council. Archived (PDF) from the original on April 22, 2015.
- Taylor, Barbara (1999). "Salmon and Steelhead Runs and Related Events of the Clackamas River Basin: A Historical Perspective" (PDF). Portland General Electric. Archived from the original (PDF) on March 11, 2006.
- Taylor, George H.; Hannan, Chris (1999). The Climate of Oregon: From Rain Forest to Desert. Corvallis: Oregon State University Press. ISBN 0-87071-468-6.
