= Crystal Springs Creek =

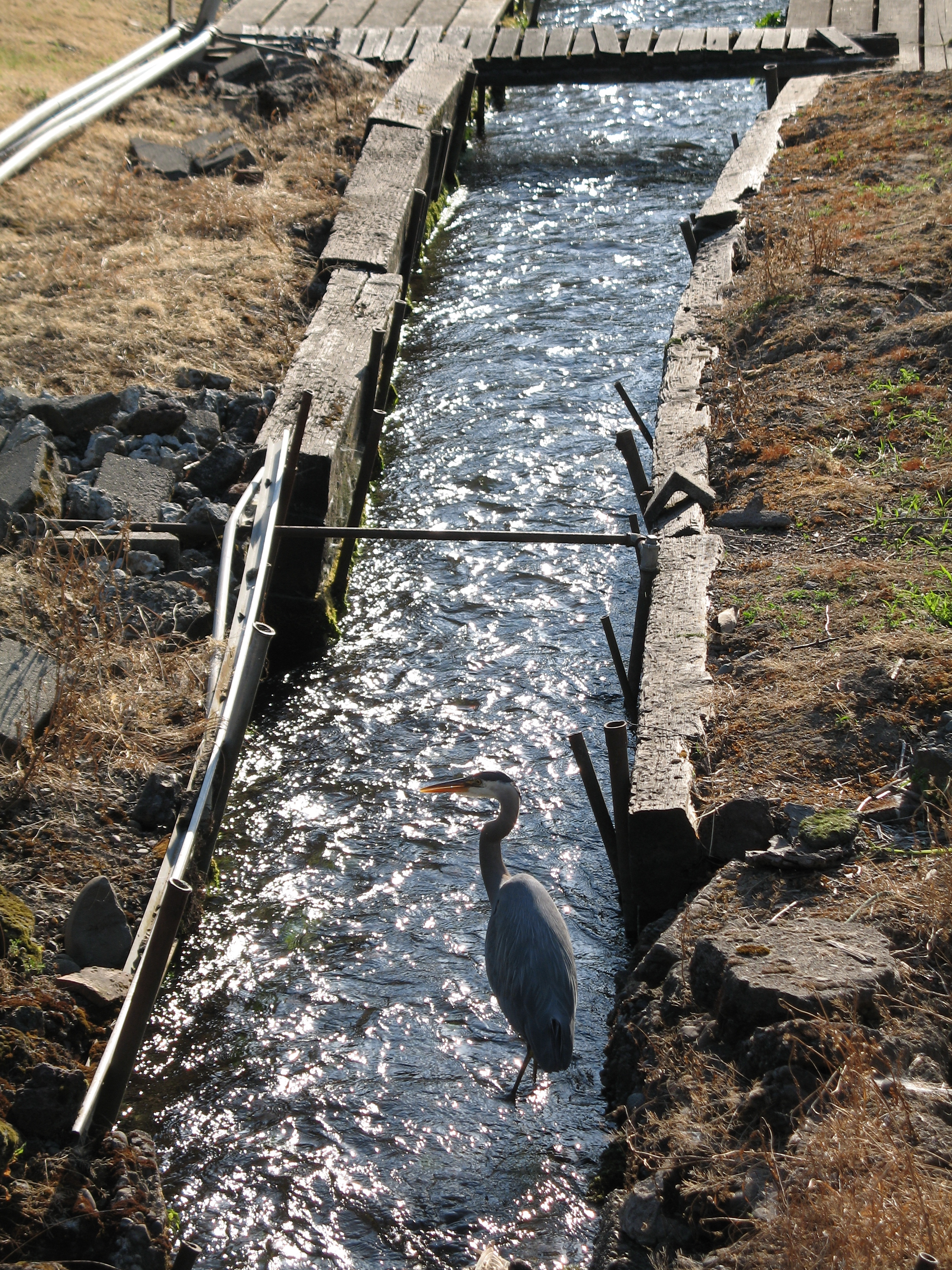
- Headwaters near Reed College

- Location of the mouth of Crystal Springs Creek in Oregon

Location
- Country: United States
- State: Oregon
- County: Multnomah

Physical characteristics
- Source: natural springs near Reed College
  - location: Portland, Oregon
  - coordinates: 45°28′50″N 122°37′24″W
  - elevation: 203 ft (62 m)
- Mouth: Johnson Creek
  - location: Portland, Oregon
  - coordinates: 45°27′36″N 122°38′32″W
  - elevation: 43 ft (13 m)
- Length: 2.7 mi (4.3 km)

Crystal Springs Creek, a 2.7-mile (4.3 km) tributary of Johnson Creek, flows entirely within the city of Portland in the U.S. state of Oregon. The stream rises from springs near the Reed College campus in the southeastern part of the city and runs generally southwest to meet Johnson Creek in the Portland neighborhood of Sellwood.

The creek's even flow and cool year-round temperature make it a good place for fish, including coho and chinook salmon and steelhead. Steelhead populations are within the Lower Columbia River Steelhead distinct population segment as listed as threatened (2011). Coho salmon populations are within the Lower Columbia River Coho Evolutionary Significant Unit (ESU) and listed as threatened (2011). Chinook salmon populations are within the Lower Columbia River Chinook ESU and listed as threatened (2011). The stream has been designated critical habitat under the Endangered Species Act. To improve the habitat, the city is replacing old culverts that impede fish passage, and Reed College is working to improve habitat and fish passage near the headwaters at Reed Lake.

== Course ==
From Reed Lake and Blue Bridge on the Reed College campus, the stream flows west under Southeast 28th Avenue, then south around Crystal Springs Lake and the Crystal Springs Rhododendron Garden, which are on the left bank. Flowing south through the Eastmoreland Golf Course, the creek receives the overflow from Crystal Springs Lake. Further downstream, Crystal Springs Creek flows southwest under the tracks of the Union Pacific Railroad and Oregon Route 99E (Southeast McLoughlin Boulevard). Turning sharply south again, the stream passes through residential neighborhoods, Westmoreland Park, and Johnson Creek Park, where it meets Johnson Creek. About 1 mile (1.6 km) further downstream, Johnson Creek empties into the Willamette River 18.5 miles (29.8 km) above its confluence with the Columbia River.

== See also ==
- List of rivers of Oregon
