= Blue Bridge (Reed College) =

Pedestrian and bicycle bridge in Portland, Oregon

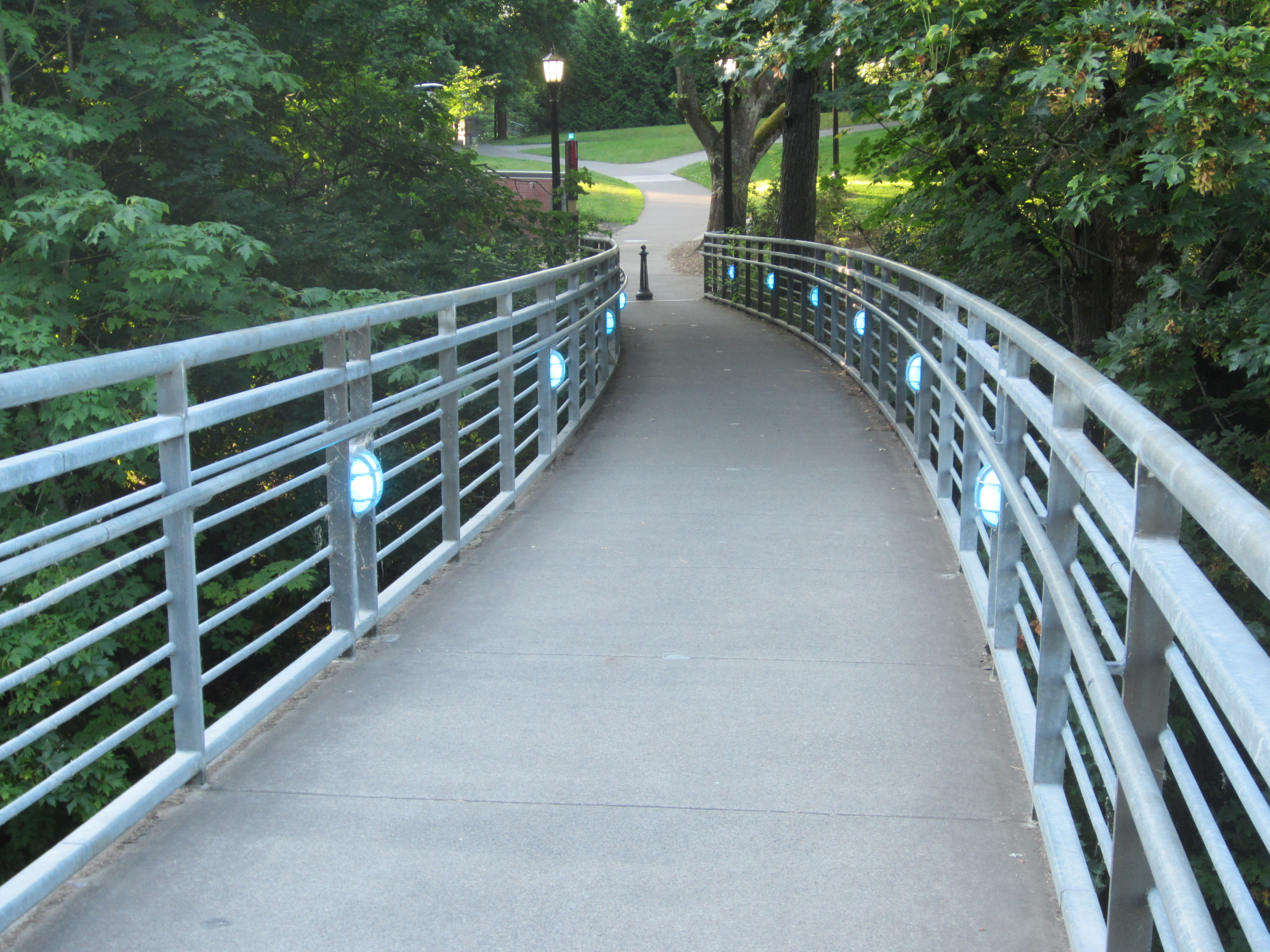
- The north end of the bridge in 2012
- Coordinates: 45.48184°N 122.63037°W
- Carries: Bicyclists; pedestrians
- Crosses: Reed Lake
- Locale: Reed College, Portland, Oregon, United States
- Other name: Cross Canyon Bridge
- Owner: Reed College

Characteristics
- Material: 4,000 pounds per square inch concrete with 60 grade steel reinforcement

History
- Engineering design by: Zimmer Gunsul Frasca Partnership
- Construction end: 1992
- Construction cost: $545,000 (est.)
- Replaces: Arthur M. Churchill Memorial Bridge

Location
- Interactive map of Blue Bridge

The Blue Bridge, also known as the Cross Canyon Bridge, is a curved pedestrian and bicycle bridge connecting the north and south halves of the Reed College campus in Portland, Oregon, in the United States. The bridge crosses Reed Lake, located within the 28-acre watershed on campus known as the "canyon"; this includes part of the course of Crystal Springs Creek, a tributary of Johnson Creek. The Blue Bridge, completed in 1992, marks the third in a series of bridges that have been commonly referred to as the "cross canyon bridges", signifying their function on campus.

The Blue Bridge replaced the Arthur M. Churchill Memorial Bridge, completed in 1959 as a replacement for a flat wooden bridge constructed in the 1930s. The unique design of the Churchill Memorial Bridge, which was supported by two cantilevers of pre-stressed plywood and covered with a thin canvas membrane, made it the only one of its kind in the world. The canvas membrane was later determined to be too slippery. Replacement of the Churchill Memorial Bridge arose from the Campus Facilities Master Plan, adopted by the City of Portland in 1990. From the designs offered by Zimmer Gunsul Frasca Partnership (now known as ZGF Architects LLP), the Canyon Committee chose a concrete structure, benefits of which included a longer lifespan, lower maintenance costs and the least environmental damage to the canyon during construction.

The Blue Bridge received the award for "Excellence in Concrete" from the American Concrete and Aggregate Producers Association. Known for its aesthetics, the bridge is often pictured in catalogs and displays to attract students to the campus. It has served as a meeting place and has been cited as a favorite location on campus by students and faculty. The bridge was featured in the films Feast of Love (2007) and Blue Like Jazz (2012).

== Background and development ==
External image
- "Canyon bridge, 1937"

In the 1930s, a flat wooden bridge was constructed to allow people to cross the lake. Excavation on the north side of the lake began in 1957 to accommodate the construction of new dormitories. After more than a year's research by an architectural firm and a plywood company, the wooden bridge was replaced in 1959 by the "first official canyon bridge", the Arthur M. Churchill Memorial Bridge. The bridge, more commonly referred to as the Cross Canyon Bridge, was designed by the architectural firm Farnham, Shell & Hoyt and was dedicated in 1958 along with the newly completed dormitories. The bridge was supported by two cantilevers of pre-stressed plywood and was covered with a thin canvas membrane. It was 132 feet (40 m) long and 15 feet (4.6 m) feet high, with stairs at each end. Its unique design made the bridge the only one of its kind in the world. The canvas membrane was later determined to be too slippery.

Replacement of the Arthur M. Churchill Memorial Bridge arose from the Campus Facilities Master Plan, adopted by the City of Portland in 1990. The initial feasibility study offered six replacement options constructed of wood. Reed College's Canyon Committee selected the option which routed access to the north end of the bridge at the lawn south of Chittick dormitory, following the existing alignment between Chittick, Coleman and Woodbridge dormitories. During the schematic design phase, Zimmer Gunsul Frasca Partnership (now known as ZGF Architects LLP) considered four conceptual structures: concrete, steel beam, steel truss and wood. ZGF recommended concrete to the Canyon Committee as offering the longest lifespan, lowest maintenance costs and the least environmental damage to the canyon during construction. The alignment of the north walkway was amended to continue the existing route between Ackerman, Chittick, Coleman and Sisson dormitories, maintaining direct access to the bridge from the north parking lot. The schematic design process for a concrete bridge was further developed to include accessibility for people with disabilities, walkway alignment and environmental restoration. This design was presented to the Reed campus community in November 1990. By January 1991, a construction budget had been developed with a general contractor.

== Construction ==
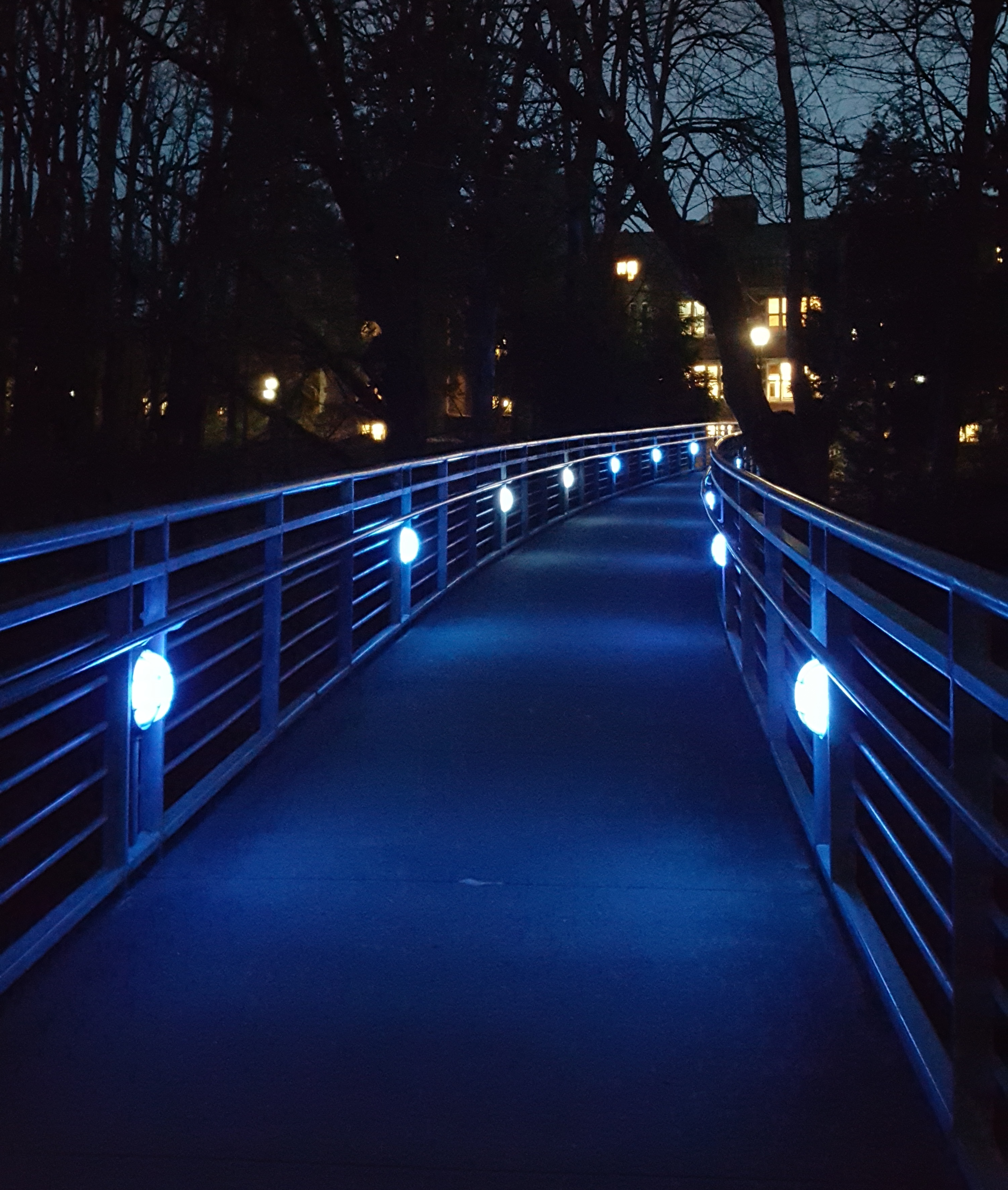
Blue lights along the bridge, 2016

According to the "Schematic Design Submittal" prepared by ZGF, complete removal of the Churchill Memorial Bridge would take place first, including its concrete footings, stairs and walkways. The new bridge would be gently sloping and curved, with a concrete "T" form supported by concrete columns. The bridge's alignment would resemble the Churchill Memorial Bridge, extending from the lawn north of Eliot Hall to the area between Chittick and Sisson dormitories.

The bridge would include metal guard rails and handrails with lighting fixtures built into the system. An accessible concrete path would be built from the south end of the bridge to the circular drive located in front of the Vollum College Center. Standard ornamental light fixtures would be installed along this new path along with others north of Eliot Hall. Covered bicycle parking structures would be added between the bridge and the north entrance to Eliot Hall. ZGF's design submittal estimated a total project budget of approximately $545,000 ($1,288,267 today), including construction costs, design and engineering fees, inspection, contingency, permits, soil reports and testing, but not administrative costs.

Construction was scheduled to occur between May 20 and August 23, 1991. The bridge was constructed of 4,000 pounds per square inch concrete with 60 grade steel reinforcement. A sack finish was applied to most surfaces. The bridge deck was finished with a medium broom texture and a clear seal coat. Along newly constructed walkways, fine grading was required, and lawns were established to blend with those already present.

The bridge was completed in 1992, during William R. Haden's term as acting president. Students reportedly replaced white bulbs with blue lights during an end-of-year celebration. The blue lights were kept because of their "captivating" appearance.

=== Environmental protection and restoration ===
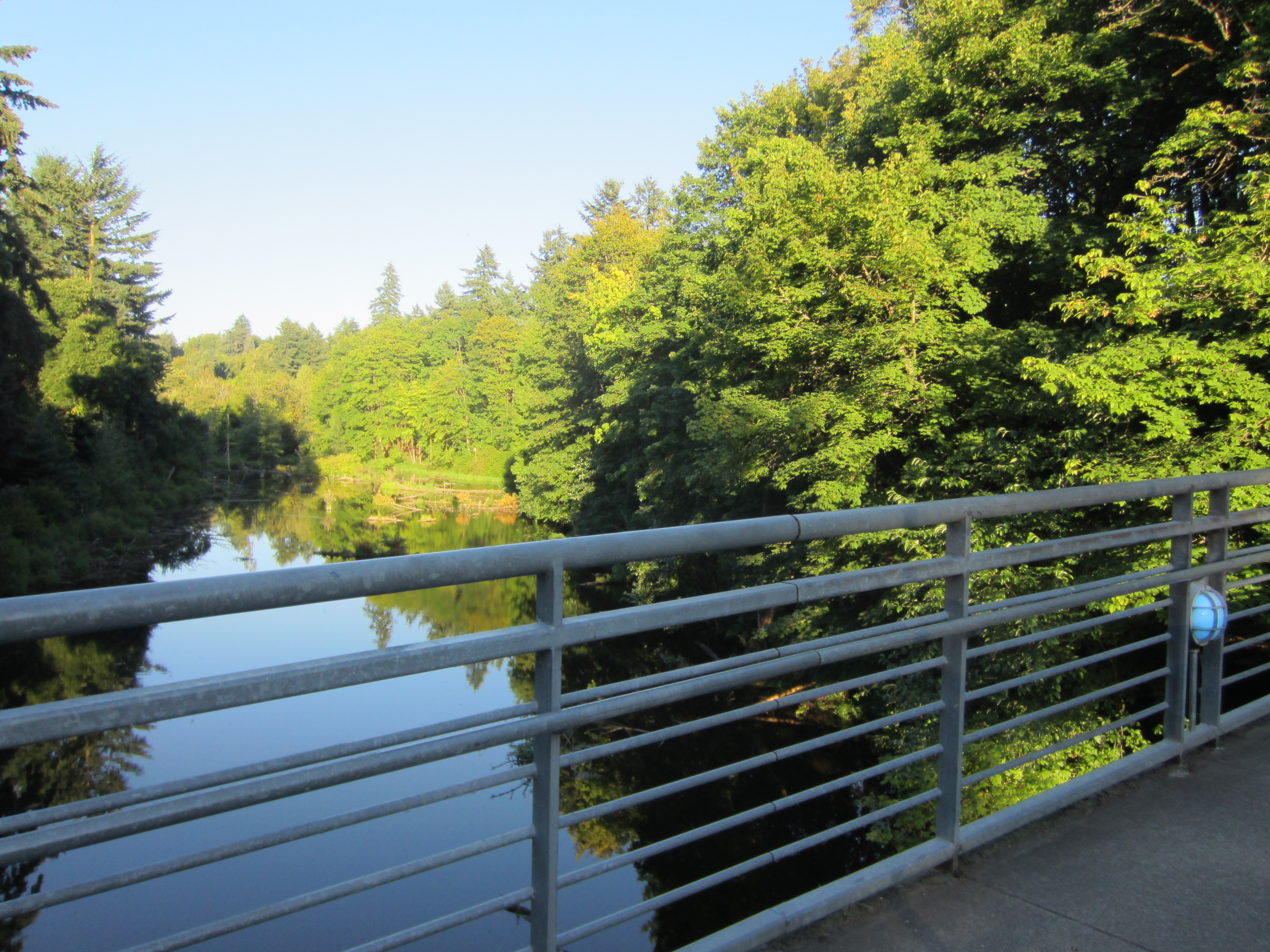
Environmental protection and restoration of the canyon were included in the earliest stages of bridge development.

Protection and restoration of the canyon environment were included in the earliest stages of bridge development. ZGF Architects and the Canyon Committee chose concrete as the preferred structure material partly because it offered the least environmental degradation to the canyon during construction. The "Schematic Design Submittal" required that Reed Lake and surrounding vegetation be protected during and restored following construction.

Within the designated construction area, existing plants and trees were provided protection or transplanted, though some trees in the bridge's path were pruned or removed. During construction, the lake bed and waterway were protected from erosion, pollution and siltation. Topsoil and new native plants were added following construction; landscaping and plant species were determined by Reed College.

== Reception ==
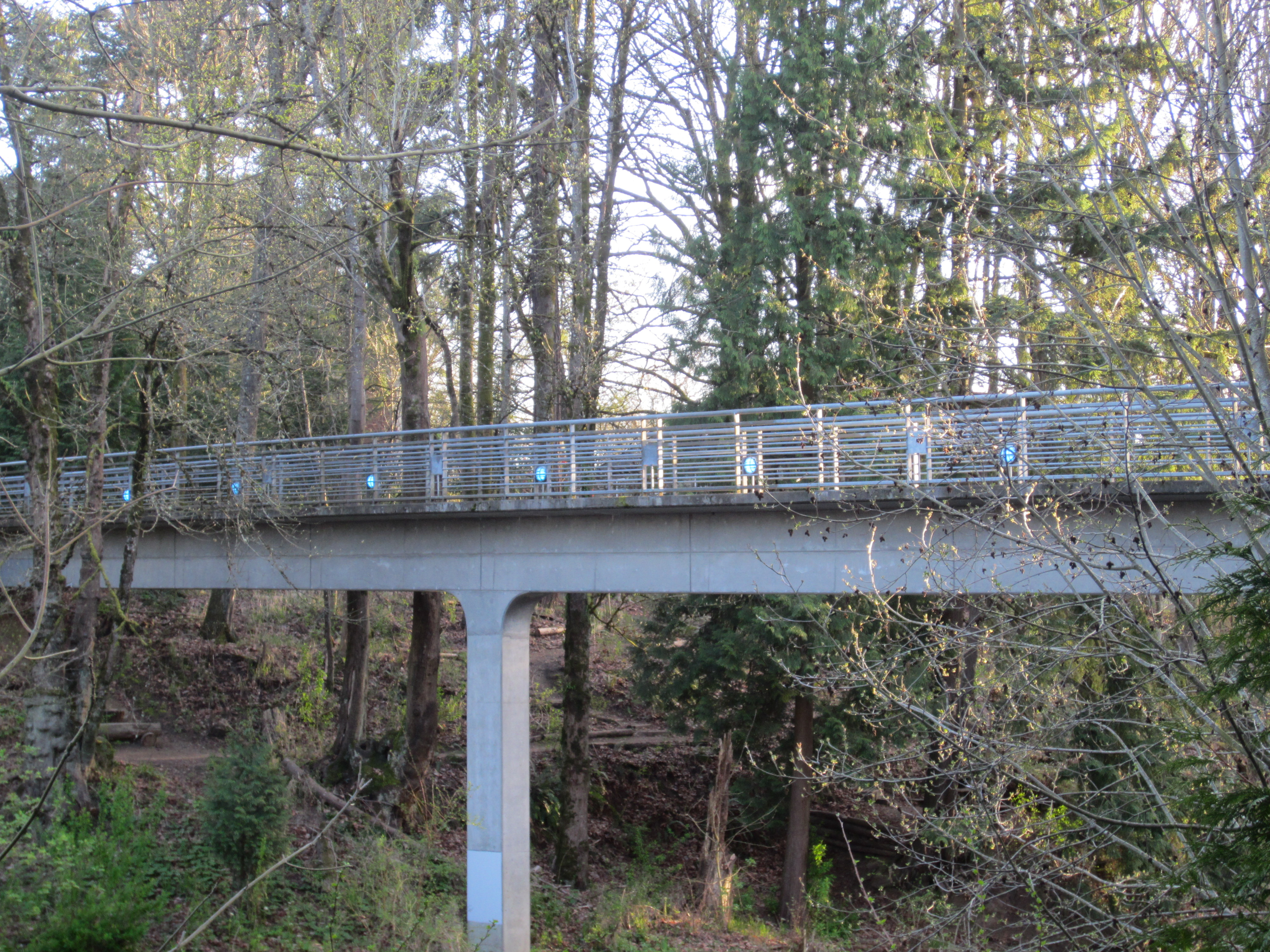
The bridge in 2013

The bridge won the award for "Excellence in Concrete" from the American Concrete and Aggregate Producers Association. For its opening, students created a "super-highway" appearance including a traffic divider; according to Reed, remnants still exist in the center of the bridge. The Blue Bridge has been included in at least one published cycling guide of Portland.

Known for its aesthetics, the Blue Bridge is often featured in catalogs and displays to attract students to the campus. The bridge has served as a meeting place and has been cited as a favorite location on campus by students and faculty. In April 2003, Tibetan Buddhist monks used the bridge to execute a milk sacrifice and to disperse sand used in the creation of a sand mandala. Former Reed College professor Helen Stafford, who became the institution's first female professor in the sciences in 1954, requested that her ashes be scattered along the shore of Reed Lake near the Blue Bridge; her request was carried out following her death in 2012. The bridge, along with other sites on the Reed College campus and throughout Portland, was featured in the films Feast of Love (2007) and Blue Like Jazz (2012). Scenes from Blue Like Jazz that included the bridge were filmed in January 2011.
