= Cedar Crossing Bridge =

Covered bridge in Oregon, US

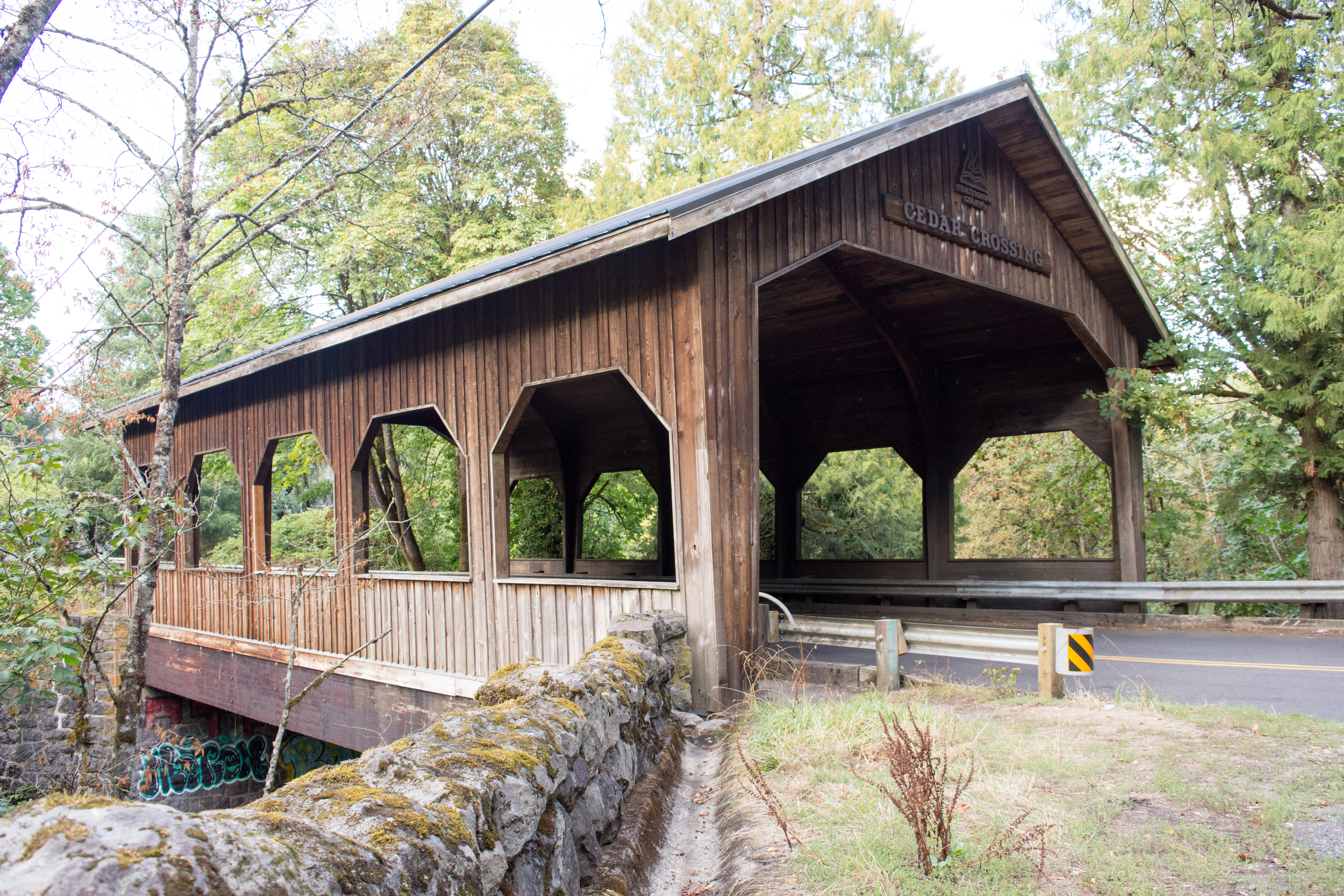
- Cedar Crossing Covered Bridge in 2016
- Coordinates: 45°28′19.3″N 122°31′25.4″W
- Carries: Deardorff Road
- Crosses: Johnson Creek
- Locale: Multnomah County, Oregon, United States
- Maintained by: Portland Bureau of Transportation

Characteristics
- Design: Deck girder
- Total length: 60 feet (18 m)
- Width: 29 feet (8.8 m)

History
- Opened: 1982

Cedar Crossing Bridge is a covered bridge in southeast Portland in the U.S. state of Oregon. Built in 1982, it carries Deardorff Road over Johnson Creek. The Oregon Department of Transportation notes that the bridge, even though it is covered, is "not a true covered bridge" because it does not use a timber truss for support.

Cedar Crossing Bridge is the only covered bridge in Multnomah County. It replaced an older wooden truss bridge that had fallen into disrepair. Notable features of the 1982 bridge include five large windows on each side, an interior finished with knotty pine, a 24-foot (7.3 m) roadway, and a separate 5-foot (1.5 m) walkway for foot traffic.

In 2015, an article in The Oregonian newspaper reported problems on or near the bridge in the form of graffiti, trash, a surface walkway with mud and standing water, and apparent bullet holes. However, the Portland Bureau of Transportation found the bridge deck to be in satisfactory condition and the overall structure to be in fair or good condition in 2014. The bridge abutments, constructed in 1936 for an earlier bridge, were said to be in fair condition.

== See also ==
- List of Oregon covered bridges
