= Fairview Creek =

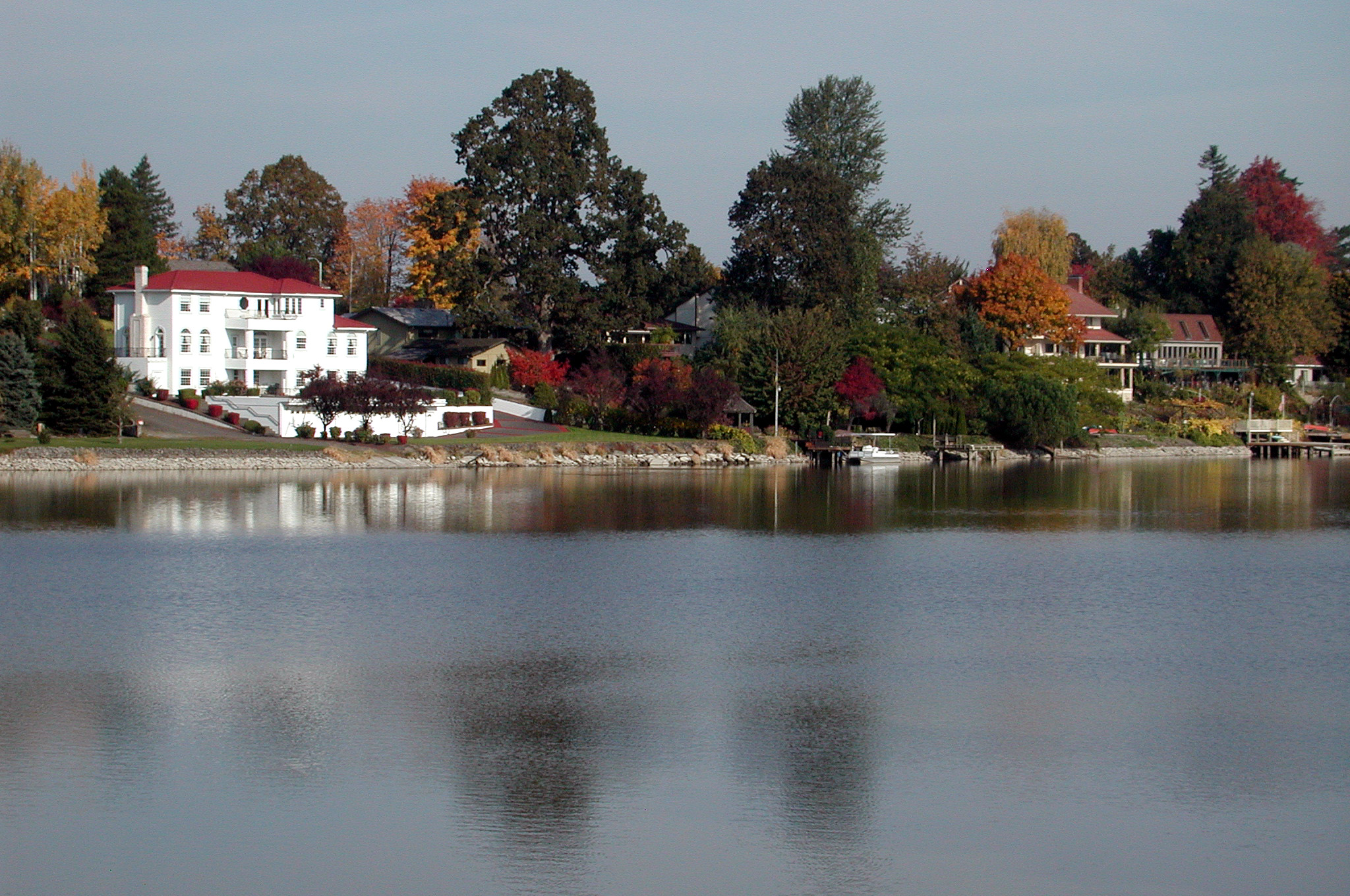
- Fairview Lake

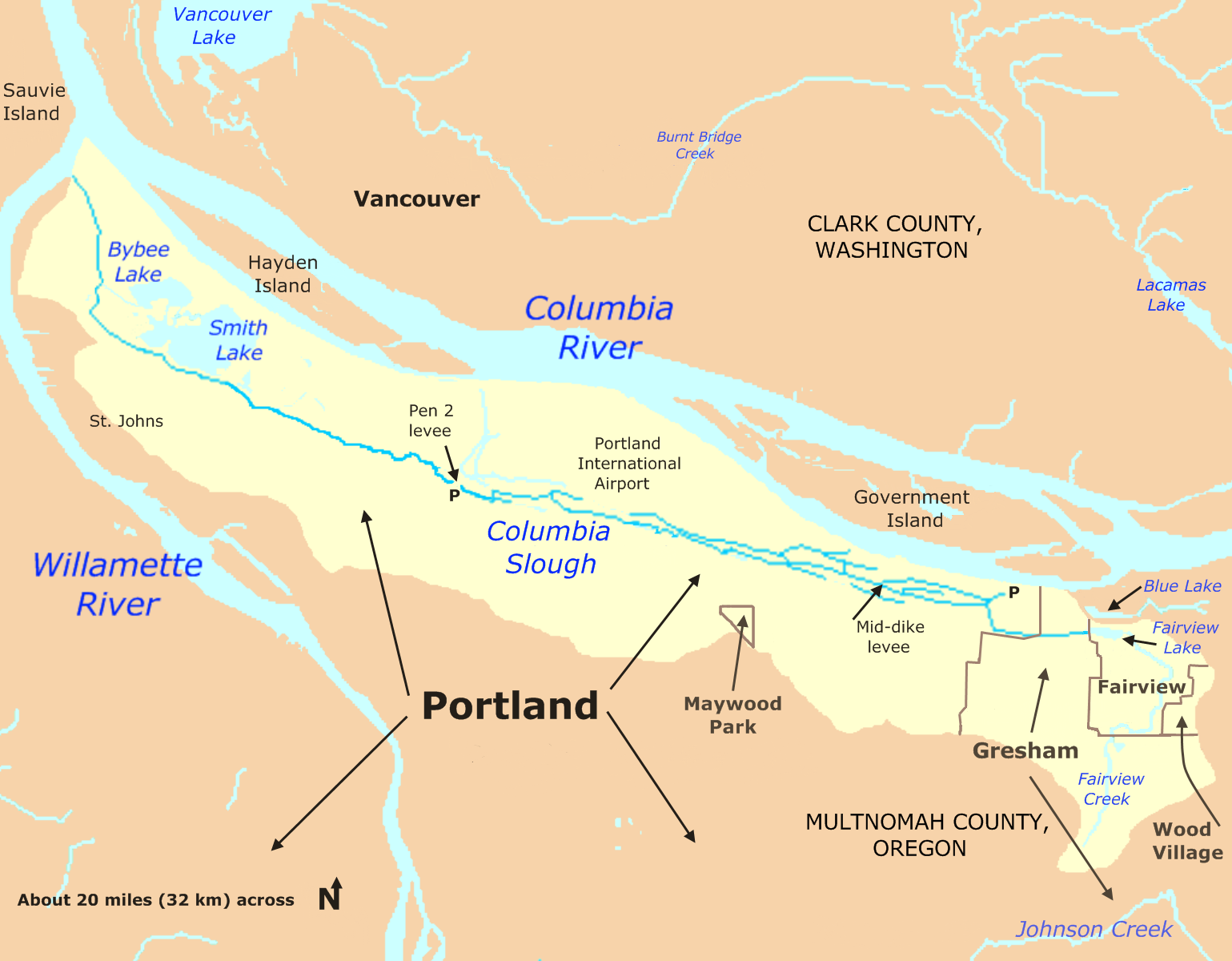
- Columbia Slough watershed, including Fairview Creek

- Location of the mouth of Fairview Creek in Oregon

Location
- Country: United States
- State: Oregon
- County: Multnomah

Physical characteristics
- Source: northeast side of Grant Butte
  - location: Gresham, Multnomah County, Oregon
  - coordinates: 45°30′02″N 122°27′37″W
  - elevation: 278 ft (85 m)
- Mouth: Fairview Lake (Oregon)
  - location: Fairview, Multnomah County, Oregon
  - coordinates: 45°33′01″N 122°26′34″W
  - elevation: 10 ft (3.0 m)
- Length: 5 mi (8.0 km)
- Discharge
  - location: Gresham, 3.5 miles (5.6 km) from the mouth
  - average: 5.78 cu ft/s (0.164 m^{3}/s)
  - minimum: 0.24 cu ft/s (0.0068 m^{3}/s)
  - maximum: 119 cu ft/s (3.4 m^{3}/s)

Fairview Creek is a 5-mile (8.0 km) tributary of the Columbia Slough in the U.S. state of Oregon. The creek forms in a wetland near Grant Butte in Gresham and flows north for 5 miles (8.0 km) to Fairview Lake in Fairview. Grant Butte, rising to 602 feet (183 m) above sea level, is one of eight dormant volcanic formations near Gresham. Fairview Creek begins northeast of the butte at an elevation of 278 feet (85 m) and falls to an elevation of 10 feet (3.0 m) at the lake.

The creek is a former tributary of the Columbia River, which it reached by flowing north through wetlands in the Columbia's floodplain. In the early 20th century, an artificial channel diverted the water from these wetlands to the Columbia Slough, a tributary of the Willamette River. In 1960, water managers built a dam to create Fairview Lake for water storage and recreation. The lake covers about 100 acres (40 ha) and is 5 feet (1.5 m) to 6 feet (1.8 m) deep. Fairview Creek has two named tributaries, No Name Creek, and Clear Creek. A smaller stream, Osburn Creek, also flows into Fairview Lake, which empties through a weir and culvert system on the west side of the lake into the upper slough.

In 2002, the City of Gresham adopted a plan for a 5.2-mile (8.4 km) hiking and biking trail to run partly along the creek. The trail was designed to provide a north–south connection between the Springwater Corridor Trail along Johnson Creek to the south and the 40-Mile Loop trail along the Columbia River. As of 2008, a 1.24-mile (2.00 km) segment of the trail between Northeast Halsey Street and Northeast Burnside Road was open to the public. Unfinished segments between Northeast Halsey and the Springwater Corridor are expected to be ready by autumn 2009. If so, at that point 3.49 miles (5.62 km) of the trail will be open to the public.

== See also ==
- List of lakes in Oregon
- List of rivers of Oregon

== Works cited ==
Bureau of Environmental Services (BES) (2005). Columbia Slough: Current Characterization Documents, "Chapter 5, Streamflow and Hydrology Characterization" (pdf). Portland, Oregon: City of Portland. Retrieved on 2008-12-14.
