= Johnson Creek Park =

Public park in Portland, Oregon, U.S.

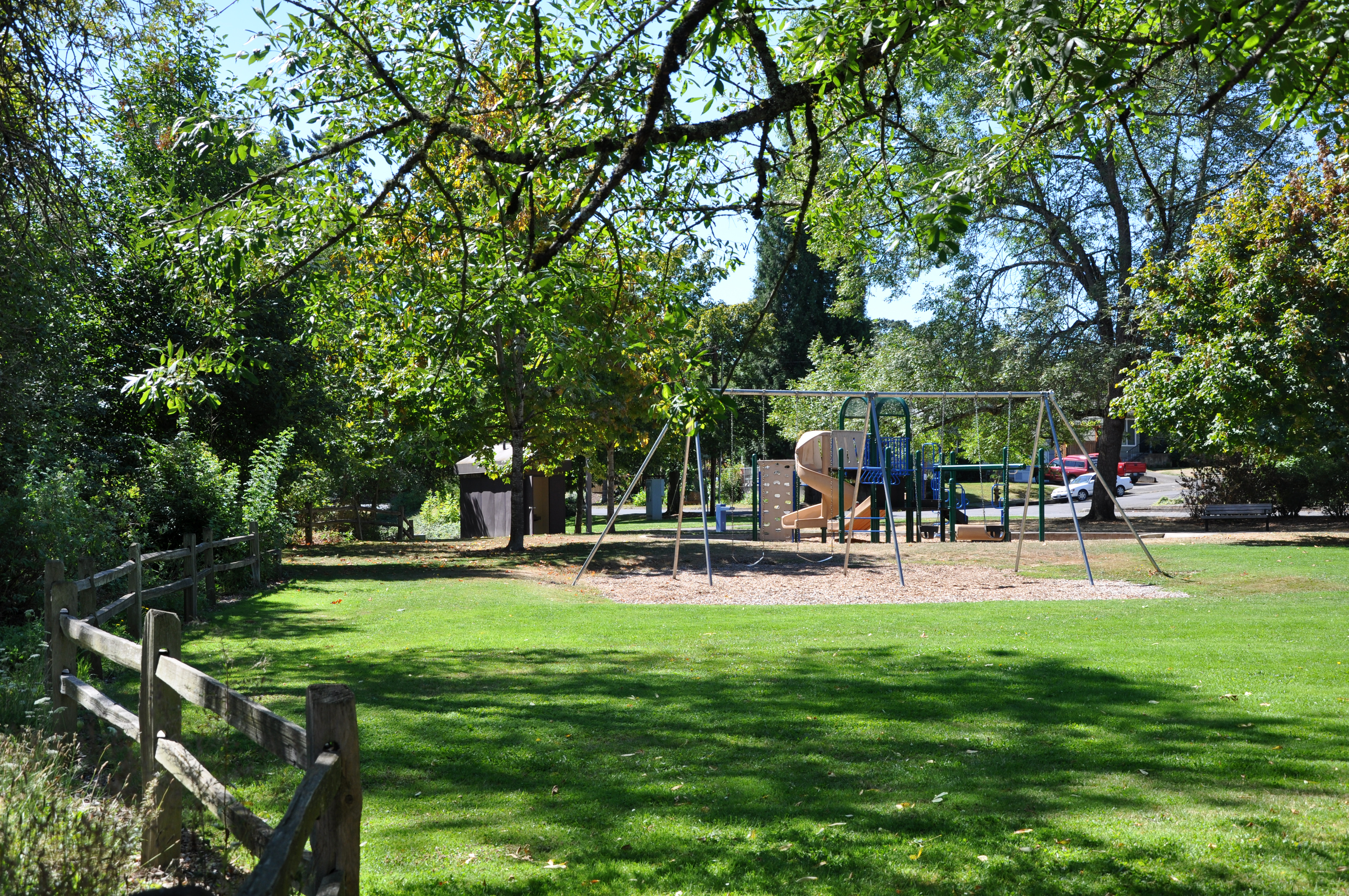
- Playground in the park, 2010
- Interactive map of Johnson Creek Park
- Type: Urban park
- Location: SE 21st Ave. and Clatsop St. Portland, Oregon
- Coordinates: 45°27′39″N 122°38′32″W
- Area: 4.52 acres (1.83 ha)
- Created: 1920
- Operator: Portland Parks & Recreation
- Status: Open 5 a.m. to midnight

Johnson Creek Park is a city park of about 4.5 acres (1.8 ha) in southeast Portland, in the U.S. state of Oregon. Located at Southeast 21st Avenue and Clatsop Street, the park takes its name from Johnson Creek, which flows through the park. The creek is named for William Johnson, who settled upstream from the park in what is now Portland's Lents neighborhood, where he operated a sawmill in the mid-19th century. Crystal Springs Creek also flows through the park and meets Johnson Creek near the park's southern boundary. Amenities include a playground, paved paths, picnic tables, and a natural area.
