= Leach Botanical Garden =

Botanical garden in Portland, Oregon, U.S.

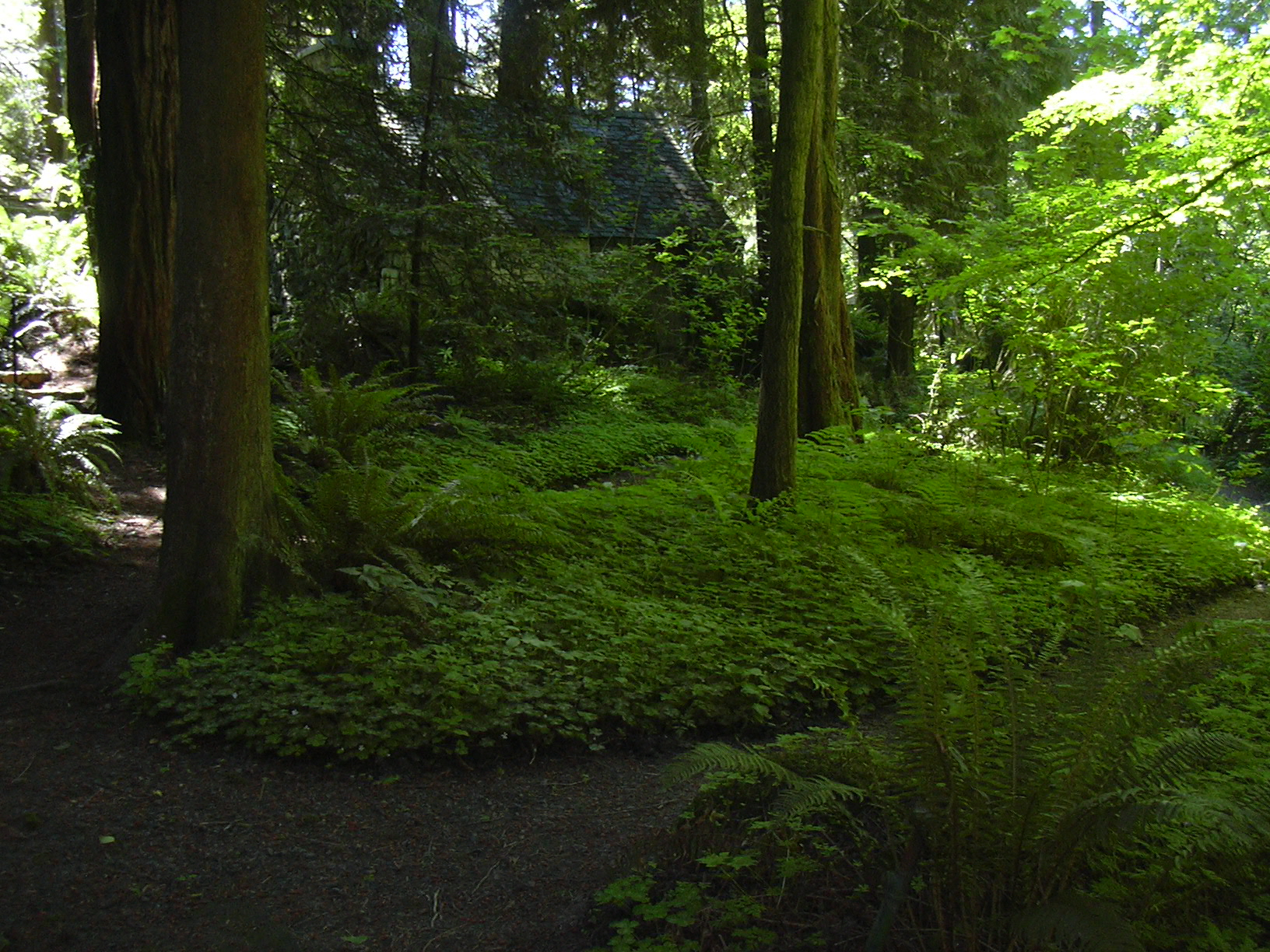
- Coniferous Woods section of Leach Botanical Garden, 2008

- Location within Portland, Oregon Location within Oregon Location within the United States
- Type: Botanical garden
- Location: 6704 SE 122nd Ave. Portland, Oregon
- Coordinates: 45.474069°N 122.534061°W
- Area: 17.35 acres (7.02 ha)
- Opened: 1983
- Operator: Portland Parks & Recreation
- Website: leachgarden.org

Leach Botanical Garden is a 16-acre (6.5 ha) botanical garden located in outer southeast Portland, Oregon, near S.E. 122nd Avenue and Foster Road. It was acquired by the Portland Parks Bureau in 1972.

== History ==
The garden was established in 1931 as landscaping for the private home of botanist Lilla Leach and pharmacist John Leach, and subsequently donated to the city. The garden was originally named Sleepy Hollow. The Leaches built their cottage-style manor house on the property in 1936. They lived in a stone cottage near Johnson Creek during the summer before the house was completed.

Lilla Leach was the first recipient of the Eloise Payne Luquer Medal, awarded by the Garden Club of America in 1950, for distinguished achievement in botany. From 1945 until 1948, she was director of Save the Myrtle Wood, Inc.

Following the Leaches' deaths, the garden was left to the City of Portland with the stipulation that the city had ten years to take over maintenance of the garden, or the land would go to the YMCA.

Work on a 5-acre (2.0 ha) expansion began in 2018 and was completed in 2021, increasing the garden's size to 16 acres (6.5 ha).

== The Gardens ==
The garden currently features a diverse collection of over 2,000 hybrids, cultivars, native and non-native plants, including alpines, medicinal herbs, rock garden plants, camellias, and 40 genera and over 125 species of ferns. Many are labeled. The property is divided by Johnson Creek and most of the land is on an incline. A self-guided tour winds along trails with views of firs, ferns, and wildflowers. As of 2010, the garden's director was David Porter.

== See also ==
- List of botanical gardens in the United States
