= Lilla Leach =

American botanist and botanical collector (1886-1980)

- Born: 13 March 1886; Barlow
- Died: 10 September 1980 (aged 94)
- Occupation: Botanist; botanical collector; scientific collector
- Academic career

Lilla Irvine Leach (March 13, 1886 – September 10, 1980) was a botanist who spent most of her career studying plants in the Pacific Northwest and West Coast of the United States. She particularly focused on Oregon, where she spent time researching with her husband and discovering new plant species. She opened her own botanical gardens in 1931.

== Early life ==
Lilla Leach was born in Oregon on her family's farm in Barlow, Clackamas County on March 13, 1886. Lilla's family settled down in Oregon after immigrating through the Oregon Trail. Growing up on a farm helped Leach discover her love for flowers and other plant life by wandering around the vast natural settings.

== Education ==
Lilla attended the Aurora School then Forest Grove Academy, where she met her husband John Leach. The two later furthered their education by attending the University of Oregon. Lilla studied botany under the botanist Albert Sweetser. Leach spent the next five years after graduating from University of Oregon teaching high school-level botany in Eugene Oregon. During this time her husband John had finally won her over, leading the two to be quickly married on her parents' farm in an outdoor ceremony in 1913.

== Research ==
After marrying her husband John, Lilla and John went on many botany expeditions to do field research and explore more primitive trails. During their Siskiyou expedition they reported traveled around 1,000 miles of unexplored trails. In June 1930, Lilla made the biggest discovery of her career. She discovered and documented a never before seen flowery shrub that belonged to the heather family of shrubs. Leach was quoted saying that upon sight of the plant "I dropped to my knees... I have never seen anything so beautiful before." The plant was named two years after the first discovery, after Lilla and John, Kalmiopsis leachiana. The plant is native to the southern Oregon region and has yet to be seen elsewhere. Lilla discovered another four unknown plant species during her years in field research.

== Awards ==
Leach was awarded the inaugural Eloise Payne Luquer Medal by the Garden Clubs of America in 1950, and was named Portland Citizen of the Week in September 1945 for her war and conservation work.

== Later life and death ==
Lilla and John bought property in Southeast Portland on the Johnson Creek, where they built a small stone cabin, which they called Sleepy Hollow. During the Second World War, the Leachs' research and collecting began to slow as they moved into a retired lifestyle. Lilla and John lived in their home at Johnson Creek until their deaths, John in 1972 and Lilla on September 10, 1980. After Lilla's death, the city of Portland gained ownership of the property and turned it into a public garden, the Leach Botanical Garden, in memory of the two.
