= Beggars Tick Wildlife Refuge =

Public park in Portland, Oregon, U.S.

- Beggars Tick Marsh
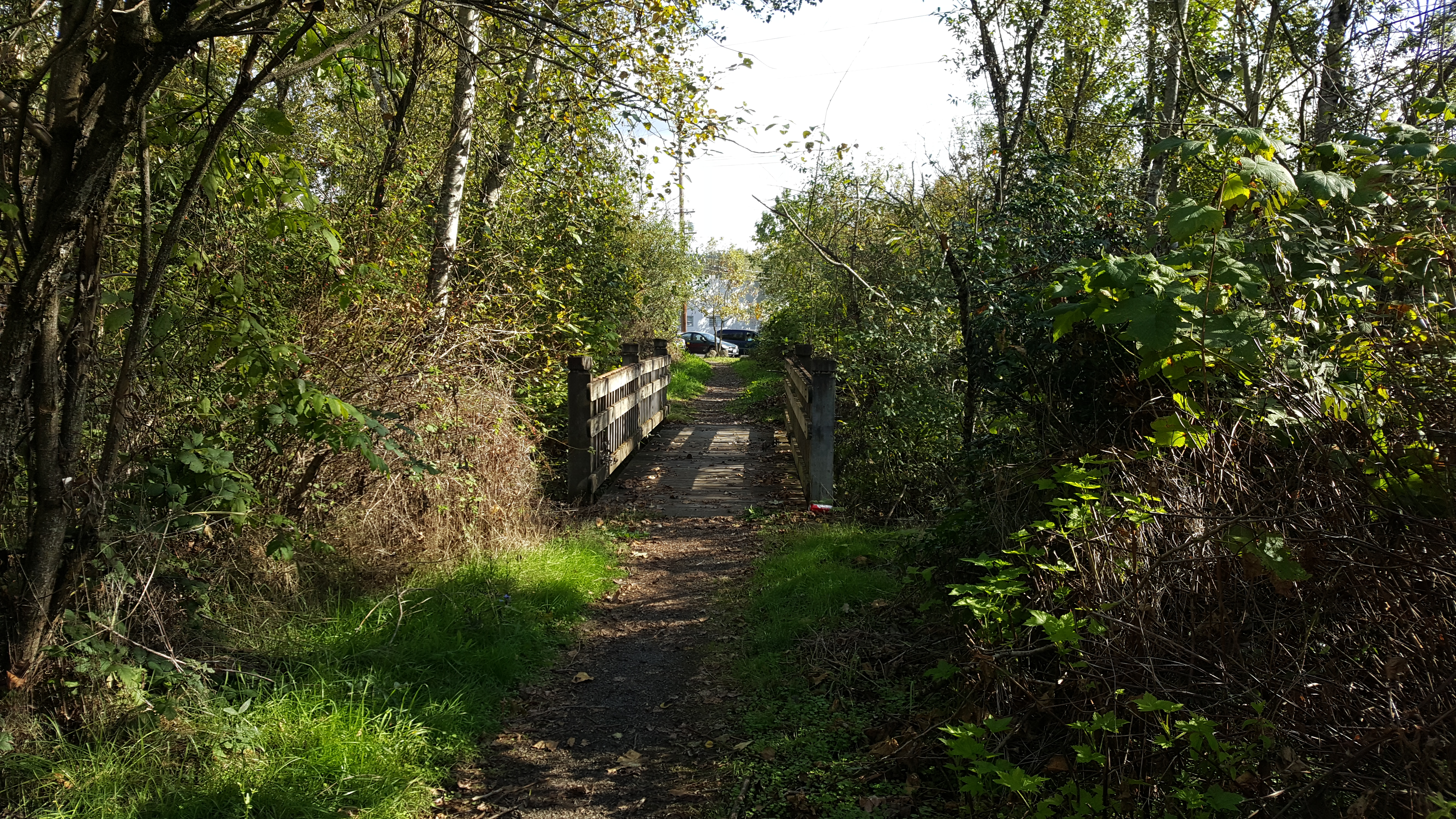
- Path in the park in 2020
- Interactive map of Beggars Tick Wildlife Refuge
- Coordinates: 45°28′44″N 122°33′1″W
- Area: 20 acres (8.1 ha)

Beggars Tick Wildlife Refuge, also known as Beggars Tick Marsh, is a 20-acre (8.1 ha) park in Portland, Oregon's Lents neighborhood, in the United States. It is named after the common name for the plant Bidens frondosa.
