= Concrete sealer =

Material used to protect concrete

Concrete sealers are applied to concrete to protect it from surface damage, corrosion, and staining. They either block the pores in the concrete to reduce absorption of water and salts or form an impermeable layer which prevents such materials from passing.

Research from major concrete authorities, including the American Concrete Institute, Portland Cement Association, and the National Ready Mixed Concrete Association confirm that most concrete damage is attributable to surface moisture intrusion. The most pervasive form of concrete damage is surface scaling from freeze/thaw. Other forms of damage include alkali-silica reaction (ASR), chemical intrusion, and corrosion of steel reinforcements.

== Types ==
In past decades, attempts to protect concrete have included sealers ranging from wax to linseed oil. Today, high quality concrete sealers can block up to 99% of surface moisture. There are two main sealer categories: topical sealers (coatings) and penetrating sealers (reactive).

=== Topical sealers ===
Topical sealers can provide visual enhancement as well as topical protection from stains and chemicals. They require a dry, clean surface during application to gain adhesion. Topical sealers may alter the coefficient of friction which can make substrates slick when wet – a condition that can be remedied by adding anti-skid materials. Life span is generally 1-5 years, although high-end epoxy/urethane systems can last significantly longer.

=== Penetrating sealers ===
Penetrating sealers can be applied to dry or damp surfaces and should be properly matched with substrate porosity in order to effectively penetrate the surface and react. The chemical reaction bonds active ingredients within the substrate blocking surface moisture. Penetrating sealers generally do not significantly modify substrate appearance or traction. Lifespan is generally 5 years or more.
