= Glenfair, Portland, Oregon =

Glenfair
- Neighborhood
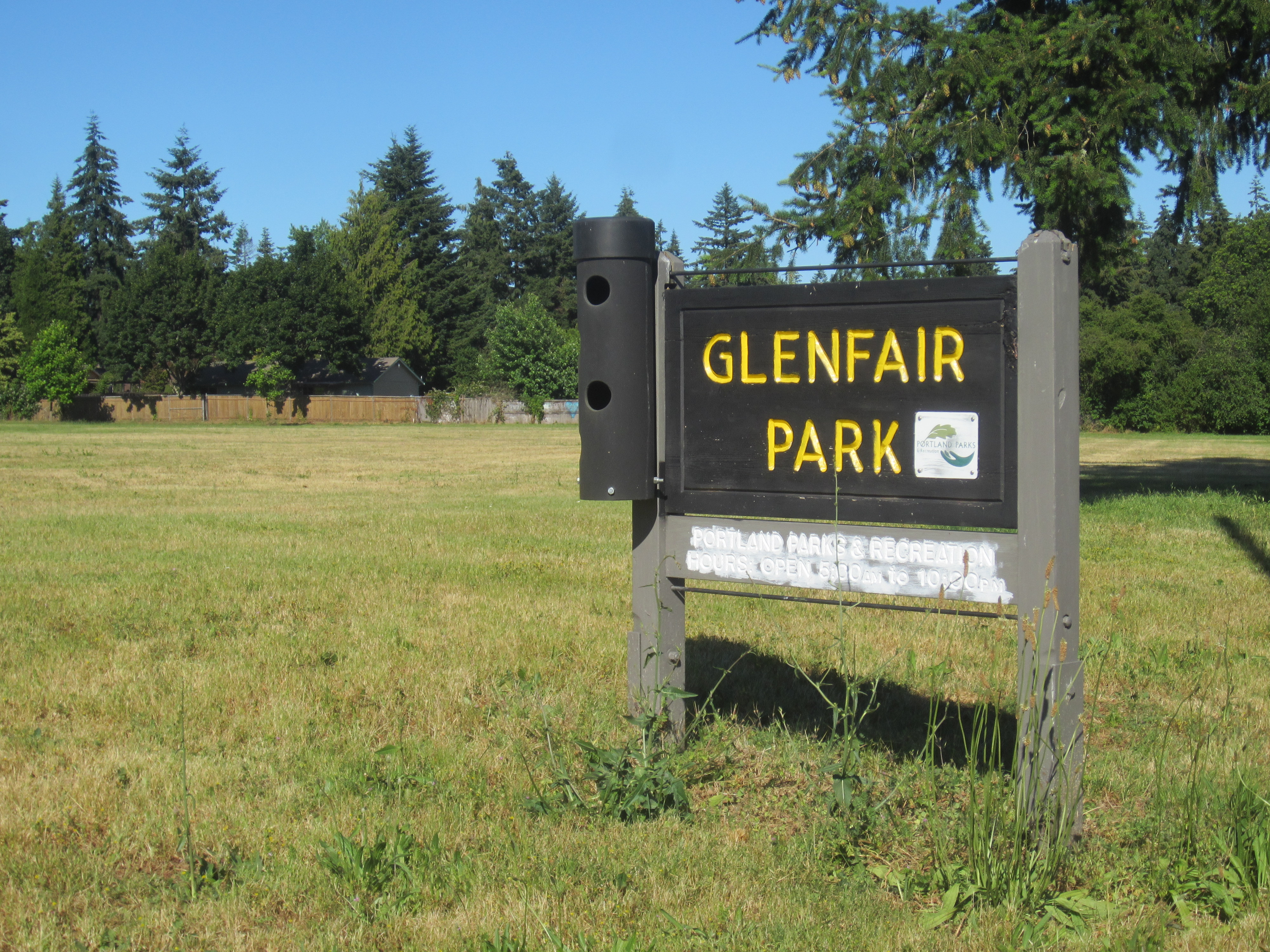
- Glenfair Park
- Interactive map of Glenfair
- Coordinates: 45°31′23″N 122°30′10″W
- Country: United States
- State: Oregon
- City: Portland

Government
  - Association: Glenfair Neighborhood Association
  - Coalition: East Portland Neighborhood Office

Area
  - Total: 0.34 sq mi (0.89 km^{2})

Population (2000)
  - Total: 2,575
  - Density: 7,500/sq mi (2,900/km^{2})

Housing
  - No. of households: 1012
  - Occupancy rate: 94% occupied
  - Owner-occupied: 282 households (28%)
  - Renting: 730 households (72%)
  - Avg. household size: 2.54 persons

Glenfair is a small neighborhood spanning the Northeast and Southeast sections of Portland, Oregon, on the city's eastern border with Gresham. It is bordered by the Wilkes, Hazelwood, and Centennial neighborhoods in Portland, as well as the City of Gresham to the east. Its boundaries are NE Glisan Street, 148th Avenue, SE Stark, and 161st Street.

The neighborhood's major attraction is Glenfair Park. The Glenfair Community Garden exists on 143rd Avenue and E Burnside. Glenfair is home to one the largest Hispanic populations of Portland.

== History ==
In late 1978, United Airlines Flight 173, a DC-8 arriving from New York and Denver, crash-landed at Burnside and 157th after running out of fuel while attempting to rectify a landing gear issue. Ten on board were killed with no casualties on the ground.

== Demographics ==
As of 2020, Glenfair had a population of 3,663, up 7% from 3,417 in 2010.

49% identified as white, 39% identified as white alone. 27.4% identified as Hispanic or Latino. 16.3% identified as Black or African American, 9.1% identified as Asian, 4.5% identified as American Indian or Alaska Native, 1.9% identified as Native Hawaiian or Pacific Islander, and 21.0% identified as some other race.
