= Raymond Park =

Raymond Park may refer to:

- Ray Park, Scottish actor, author and martial artist
- Raymond Park, Brisbane, a park in Kangaroo Point, Brisbane, Queensland, Australia
- Raymond Park (Portland, Oregon)
