= 2004 Portland, Oregon, City Commission election =

The 2004 Portland City Commission elections were held on May 18, 2004, and November 2, 2004, to elect two positions on the Portland, Oregon City Council.

Vera Katz's Chief of Staff Sam Adams won a runoff election for position 1 and Randy Leonard won re-election in a runoff for position 4.

== Position 1 ==
Portland City Commission Position 1 election, 2004
- May 18, 2004 & November 2, 2004
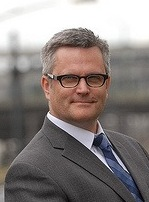

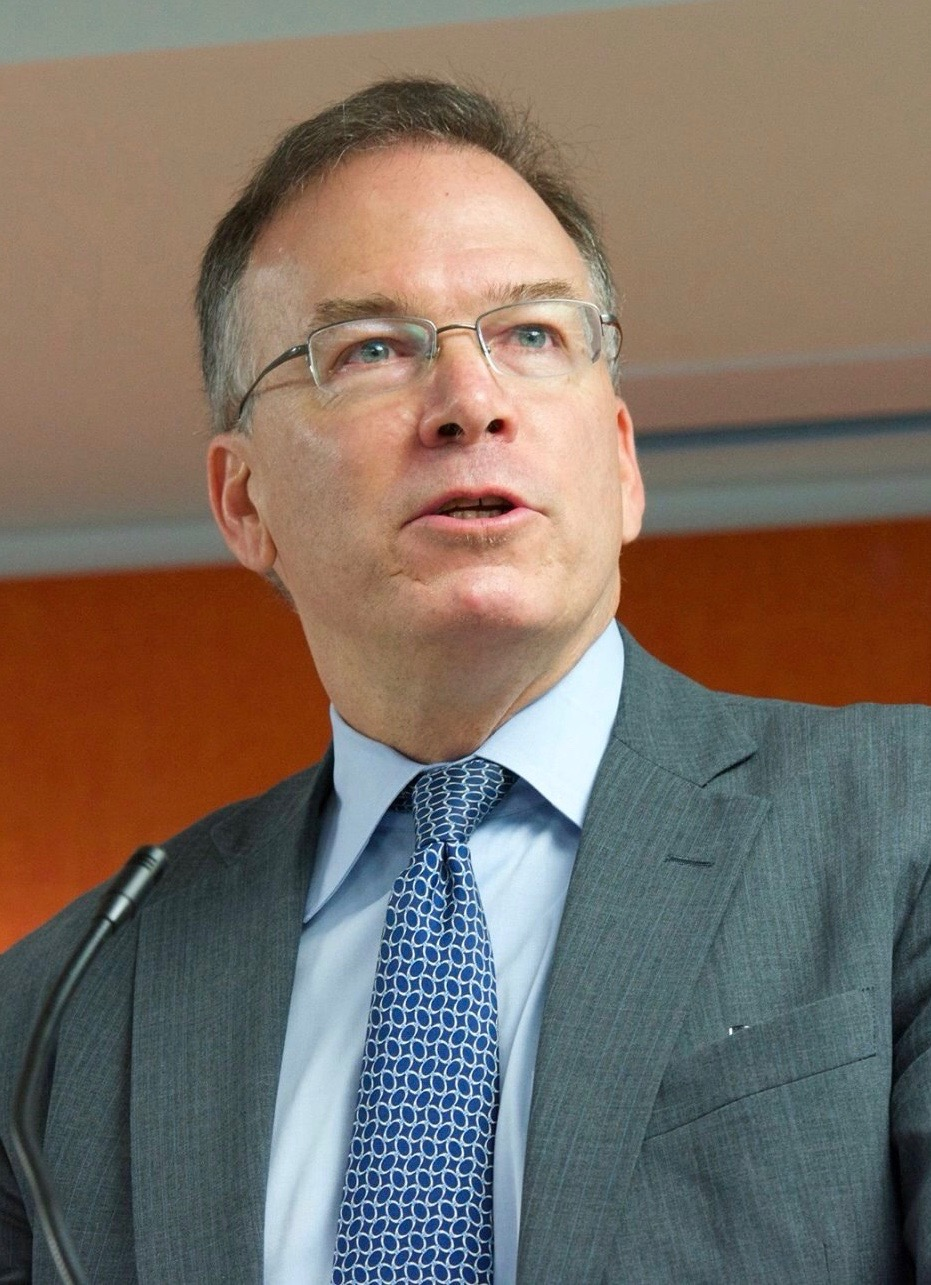

Candidate	Sam Adams	Nick Fish	Jason Newell
Party	Nonpartisan	Nonpartisan	Nonpartisan
First round	43,745; 37.11%	56,244; 47.72%	10,699; 9.08%
Second round	126,277; 51.40%	117,333; 47.76%	Eliminated
Commissioner before election
Jim Francesconi
Elected Commissioner
Sam Adams

Position 1 primary election, 2004
Party	Candidate	Votes	%
Nonpartisan	Nick Fish	56,244	47.72%
Nonpartisan	Sam Adams	43,745	37.11%
Nonpartisan	Jason Newell	10,699	9.08%
Nonpartisan	Brian H. Smith	1,789	1.52%
Nonpartisan	Woodrow "Woody" Broadnax	1,672	1.41%
Nonpartisan	Aquiles U. Montas	1,543	1.31%
Nonpartisan	Jerry Watson	1,539	1.31%
Write-in		639	0.54%
Total votes		118,193	100

Position 1 runoff election, 2004
Party	Candidate	Votes	%
Nonpartisan	Sam Adams	126,277	51.40%
Nonpartisan	Nick Fish	117,333	47.76%
Write-in		2,054	0.84%
Total votes		245,664	100

== Position 4 ==
Portland City Commission Position 4 election, 2004
- May 18, 2004 & November 2, 2004
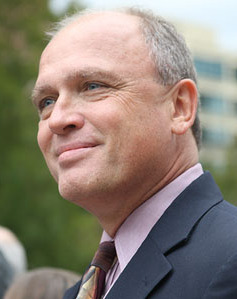

Candidate	Randy Leonard	Mark Lloyd Lakeman	Frank Dixon
Party	Nonpartisan	Nonpartisan	Nonpartisan
First round	61,201; 52.67%	9,743; 8.38%	9,100; 7.83%
Second round	167,418; 94.46%	Eliminated	Eliminated
Commissioner before election
Randy Leonard
Elected Commissioner
Randy Leonard

Position 4 primary election, 2004
Party	Candidate	Votes	%
Nonpartisan	Randy Leonard	61,201	52.67%
Nonpartisan	Mark Lloyd Lakeman	9,743	8.38%
Nonpartisan	Frank Dixon	9,100	7.83%
Nonpartisan	Mary Ann Schwab	7,199	6.20%
Nonpartisan	Paul Leistner	6,792	5.85%
Nonpartisan	Leonard Gard	4,753	4.09%
Nonpartisan	Aaron F. Hall	4,525	3.89%
Nonpartisan	Bonny McKnight	4,325	3.72%
Nonpartisan	Alicia Salaz	2,763	2.38%
Nonpartisan	Scott Stephens	2,315	1.99%
Nonpartisan	Jim Whittenburg	1,515	1.30%
Write-in		1,969	1.69%
Total votes		116,200	100.00%

Position 4 runoff election, 2004
Party	Candidate	Votes	%
Nonpartisan	Randy Leonard	167,418	94.46%
Write-in		9,813	5.54%
Total votes		177,231	100
