= Thompson Park (Portland, Oregon) =

Public park in Portland, Oregon, U.S.

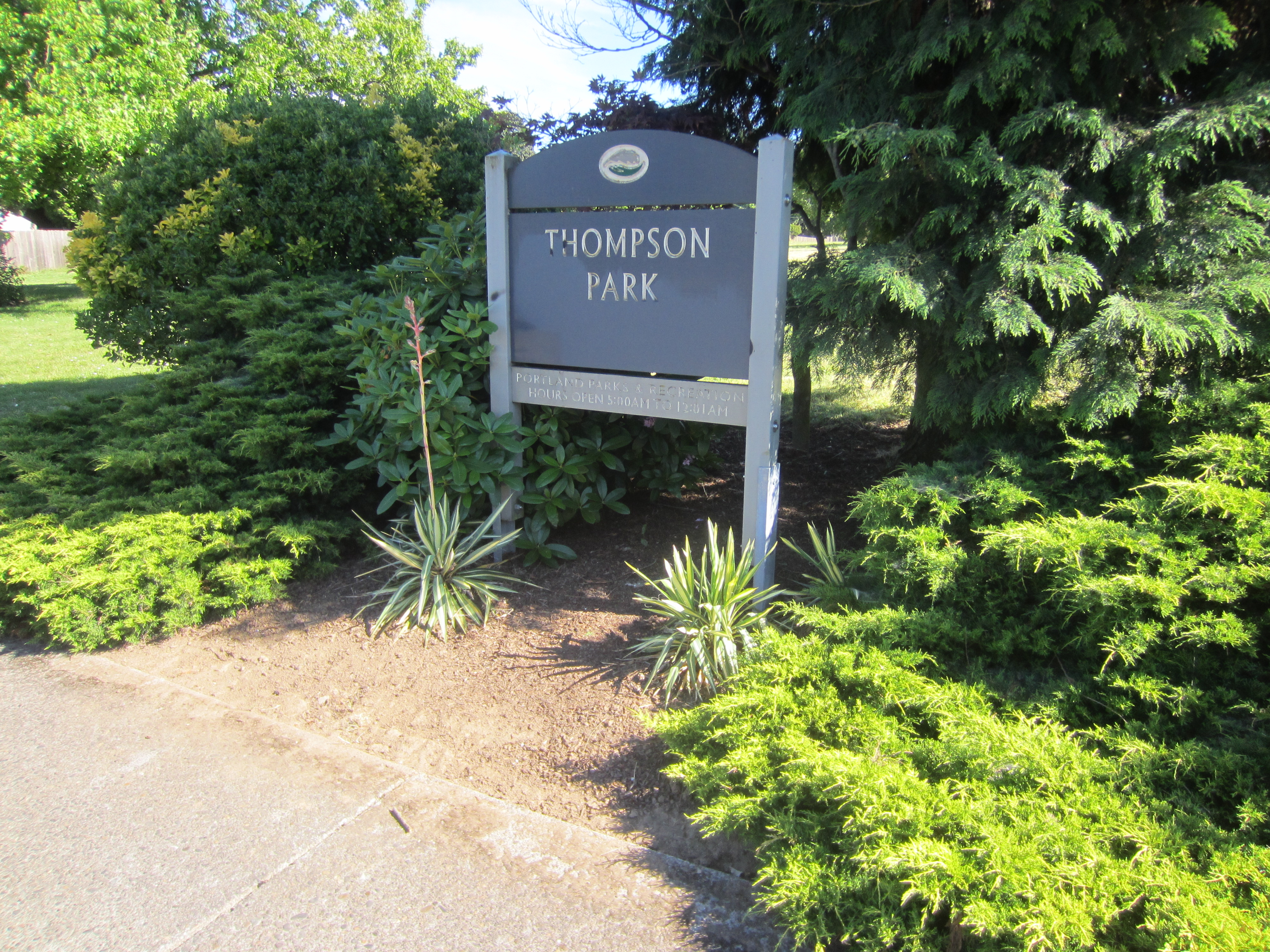
- Park sign, 2022
- Interactive map of Thompson Park
- Location: NE 138th Ave. and Thompson St. Portland, Oregon
- Coordinates: 45°32′23″N 122°31′02″W
- Area: 4.42 acres (1.79 ha)
- Operator: Portland Parks & Recreation

Thompson Park is a 4.42-acre (1.79 ha) public park in the Russell neighborhood of northeastern Portland, Oregon, United States. The park was acquired in 1986.
