= Russell, Portland, Oregon =

Russell
- Neighborhood
- Location in Portland
- Coordinates: 45°32′14″N 122°31′38″W
- Country: United States
- State: Oregon
- City: Portland

Government
  - Association: Russell Neighborhood Association
  - Coalition: East Portland Neighborhood Office

Area
  - Total: 0.80 sq mi (2.1 km^{2})

Population (2020)
  - Total: 3,241
  - Density: 4,100/sq mi (1,600/km^{2})

Russell is a neighborhood in the northeast section of Portland, Oregon, United States. Russell lies between Interstate 84 on the north and NE Halsey St. on the south, and between NE 122nd Ave on the west and NE 142nd Ave. on the east. It borders Argay on the north, Wilkes on the east, Hazelwood on the south, and Parkrose Heights on the west.

Russell is the location of Linfield University's Portland Campus and Portland Christian Jr/Sr High School, as well as John Luby Park and Thompson Park.

== History ==
Russell was the location of Skylife Airport, a short-lived general aviation airport that was established around the winter of 1946-47. After losing its bid to become Portland's primary airport in 1954, it was closed and became a housing project. It is currently the location of Thompson Park and a school building, formerly home to Mt Hood Community College's Thompson Center, a Multnomah Early Childhood Program, and since 2014, Wheatley School, specializing in special education.

== Demographics ==
In 2020, 3,241 people lived in Russell, comprising 1,196 households. This was a 2% increase from the 3,162 people recorded in the 2010 census. Of the 68% of people who identified as White, 64% did not mark down an additional race and 9.8% identified as Hispanic or Latino. 12.8% identified as Asian, 7.8% identified as Black or African American, 3.1% identified as American Indian or Alaskan Native, 0.9% identified as Native Hawaiian or Pacific Islander, and 8.2% indicated some other race. The median age in the neighborhood was 43.6.
