= Owen Summers =

Founder of Oregon National Guard

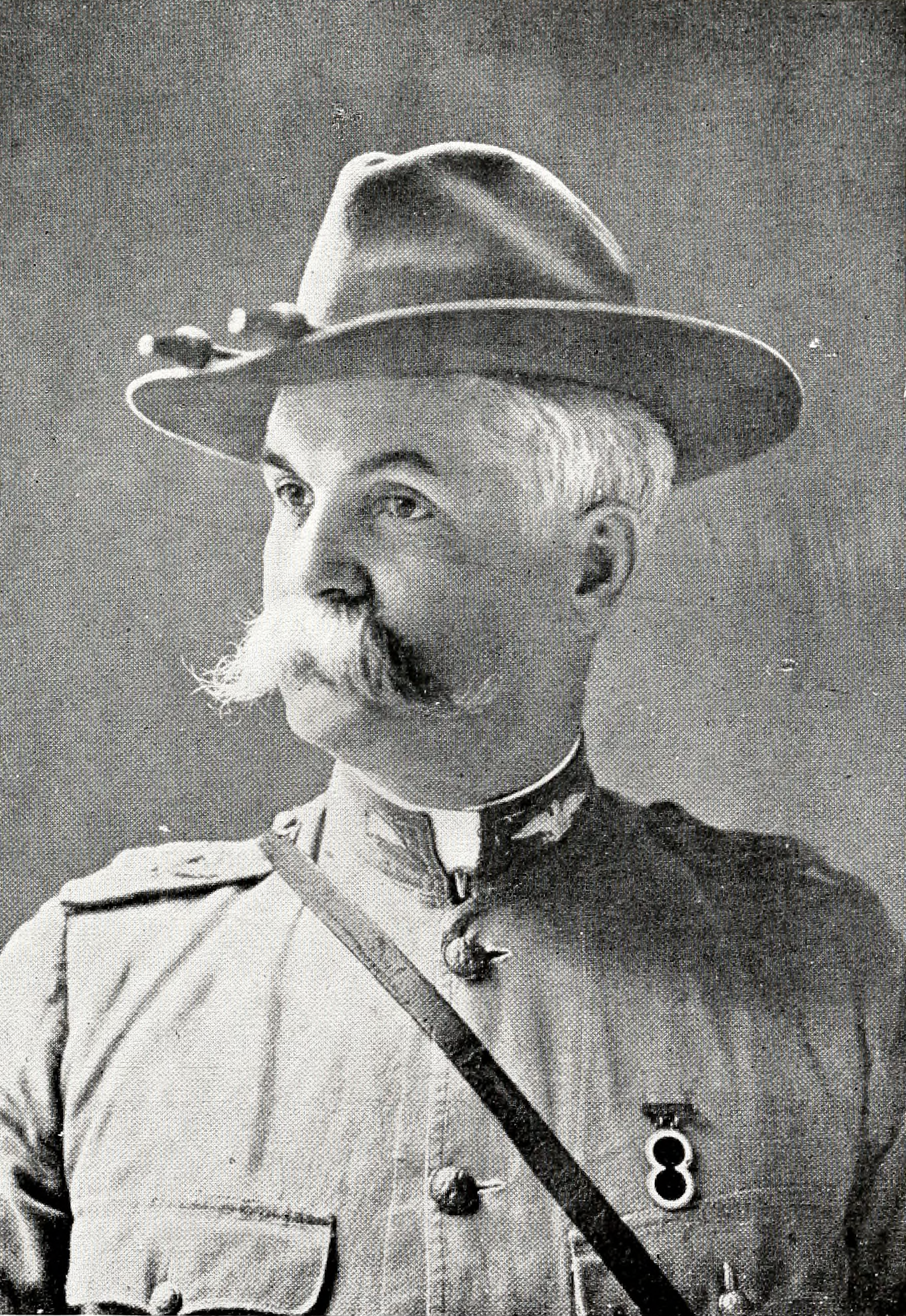

Owen Summers (June 13, 1850 – January 21, 1911) was a businessman, Oregon state legislator, and founder of the Oregon National Guard. Colonel Summers Park in Portland, Oregon, is named in his honor.

== Early years ==
Owen Summers was born in Brockville, Canada West, on June 13, 1850, to parents John and Elizabeth Ann Summers, with Owen one of five children. The family soon moved to Chicago, Illinois, where John Summers entered the shoe business. In 1856, the parents and one daughter died in a cholera epidemic, leaving the remaining four children orphans. Owen went to a farm in Frankfort, Illinois, near Chicago. Owen worked on the farm, earning his room and board, as well as clothing, and attended school nearby when possible.

== Civil War service ==
In 1865 Owen, and four of his friends decided to join the Union Army in the American Civil War. They were fourteen years old. The recruiters refused to enlist them, six times. Then a Pennsylvania Dutchman agreed to take on the youngsters as their guardian, and the Army allowed them to join. On February 1, 1865 Owen Summers joined Company H of the 3rd Illinois Cavalry Regiment. Summers immediately shipped out to his unit, in Eastern Mississippi. Based on these dates, young Summers may have seen action in some battles before the end of the war, or perhaps he joined units that were ending their involvement. The Third Illinois Cavalry was reassigned to Missouri, to join battles against the Sioux Indians in Minnesota and the Dakotas. This assignment lasted during the summer of 1865. Summers and the regiment were mustered out in December, 1865.

== Business and civic ==
Returning to the farm after his stint in the Army, Summers later moved to Chicago in 1871. He was caught in the Great Chicago Fire, rescuing his new family and two others. After the fire, Summers performed contractor work in rebuilding the city. He continued his contractor work on the West Coast, working in San Francisco and San Diego, before arriving in Portland, Oregon in 1879. He founded a crockery business with his brother-in-law, J. C. Olds, called Olds & Summers, and supplying crockery both wholesale and retail. The business flourished, as the two men became prominent local businessmen in Portland, Oregon.

In 1896, Summers was selected as the United States Appraiser for the Port of Portland, Oregon. In this role he was responsible for the examination, appraisal, and classification of all merchandise which is liable to customs duties upon importation or exportation from the Port. He continued to serve in this role until his death, with the exception of the period of his military duties in the Philippines.

== Military service ==
In 1886, serving in the Oregon State Assembly, Summers was instrumental in getting a bill passed that resulted in the state militia becoming the Oregon National Guard. One of the three new guard regiments was one Summers had organized in 1883 from veterans of the Civil War. At the opening of the Spanish–American War, the guard was consolidated into the 2nd Oregon Volunteer Infantry Regiment, with Summers as its commanding colonel. In May, 1898, the Oregon Volunteers were the first regiment to sail for the Philippines in the Spanish–American War. Arriving in Manila in August they accepted the surrender of the Spanish Army of 15,000 soldiers. The Philippine insurgents who had been fighting the Spanish for several years expected to become the government of the new independent nation. Fighting now began between 11,000 American soldiers and the Philippine insurgents. The Second Oregon Regiment fought in a number of major battles, and provided provost duties in Manila. During its term of service the regiment participated in forty-two engagements. The Second Oregon Regiment returned to the United States in 1899, and was de-commissioned from the Army. Owen Summers was honored with a brevet Brigadier General recognition.

== Family ==
Owen Summers was married to Clara T. Olds in Portland, Oregon on July 23, 1880. Clara was the daughter of some of the original pioneers in Oregon. They had one child, Owen Summers Jr. Their son also joined the military, serving in World War II as a Major General, and having received multiple honors including the Silver Star and a Purple Heart. Mr. and Mrs. Summers were active in many civic and fraternal organizations in Oregon.

Owen Summers died in Portland, Oregon, on January 21, 1911. He and his son are buried in Portland's River View Cemetery, where many Spanish–American War veterans are buried.
