= Verdell Burdine Rutherford Park =

Public park in Portland, Oregon, U.S.

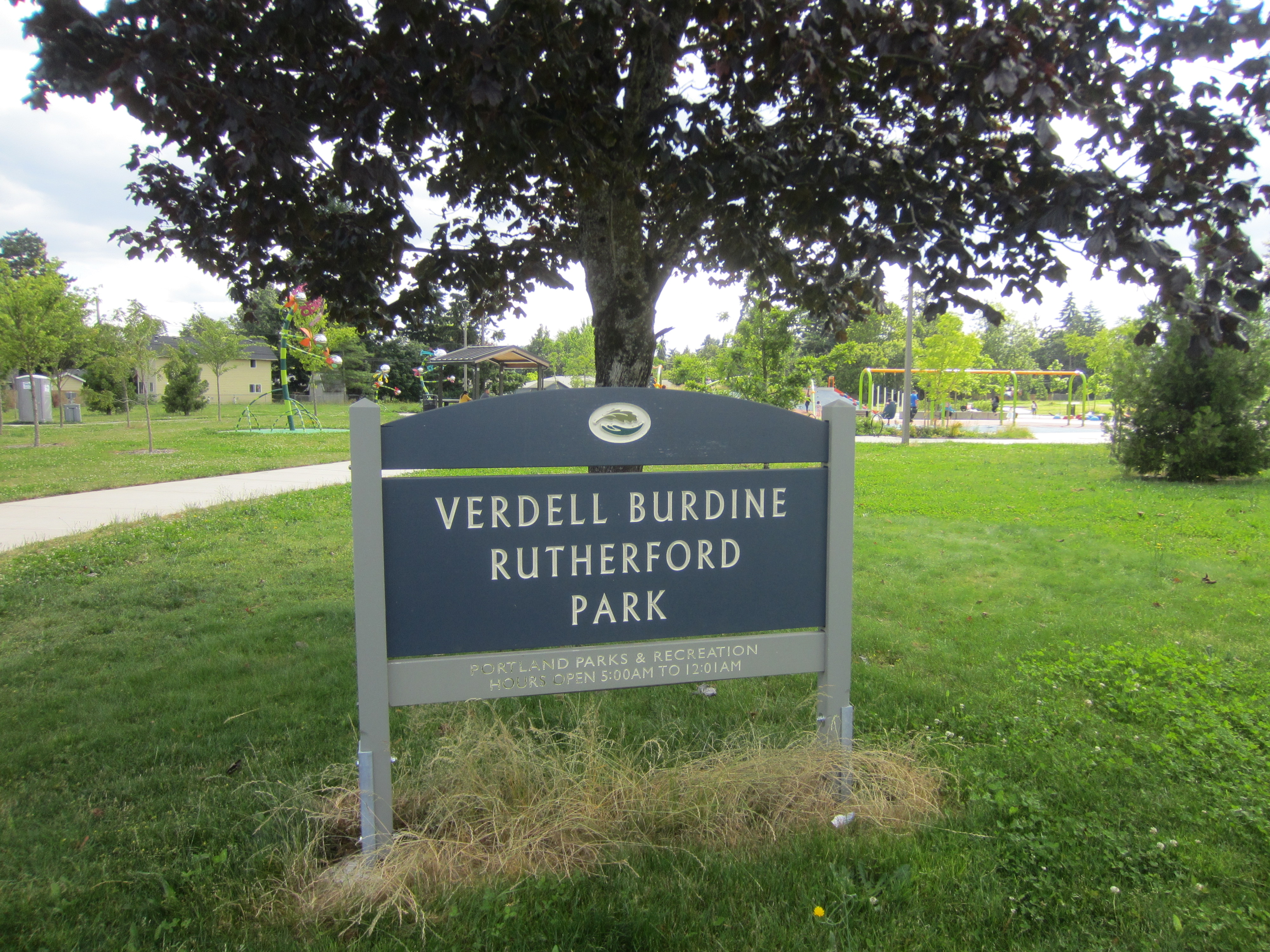
- Park sign, 2022
- Interactive map of Verdell Burdine Rutherford Park
- Location: SE 167th Ave and Market St. Portland, Oregon
- Coordinates: 45°30′41″N 122°29′33″W
- Area: 7.7 acres (3.1 ha)
- Operator: Portland Parks & Recreation

Verdell Burdine Rutherford Park (formerly Lynchview Park) is a 7.7-acre (3.1 ha) public park in southeast Portland, Oregon, named after Verdell Burdine Rutherford, a prominent civil rights activist in the region.

== History ==
In the late 1800s, Patrick Lynch donated a large parcel of land to the Centennial School District. The school district built Lynchview Elementary School and the adjacent land became a park.

Portland Parks & Recreation acquired the park in 1993 and it was named Lynchview Park.

In 2020, the school was renamed Patrick Lynch Elementary School and the park was renamed Verdell Burdine Rutherford Park. The park received paved pathways, a new playground, a picnic shelter, and a Portland Loo. The soccer field was also remodeled and public art was added.

== Gallery ==
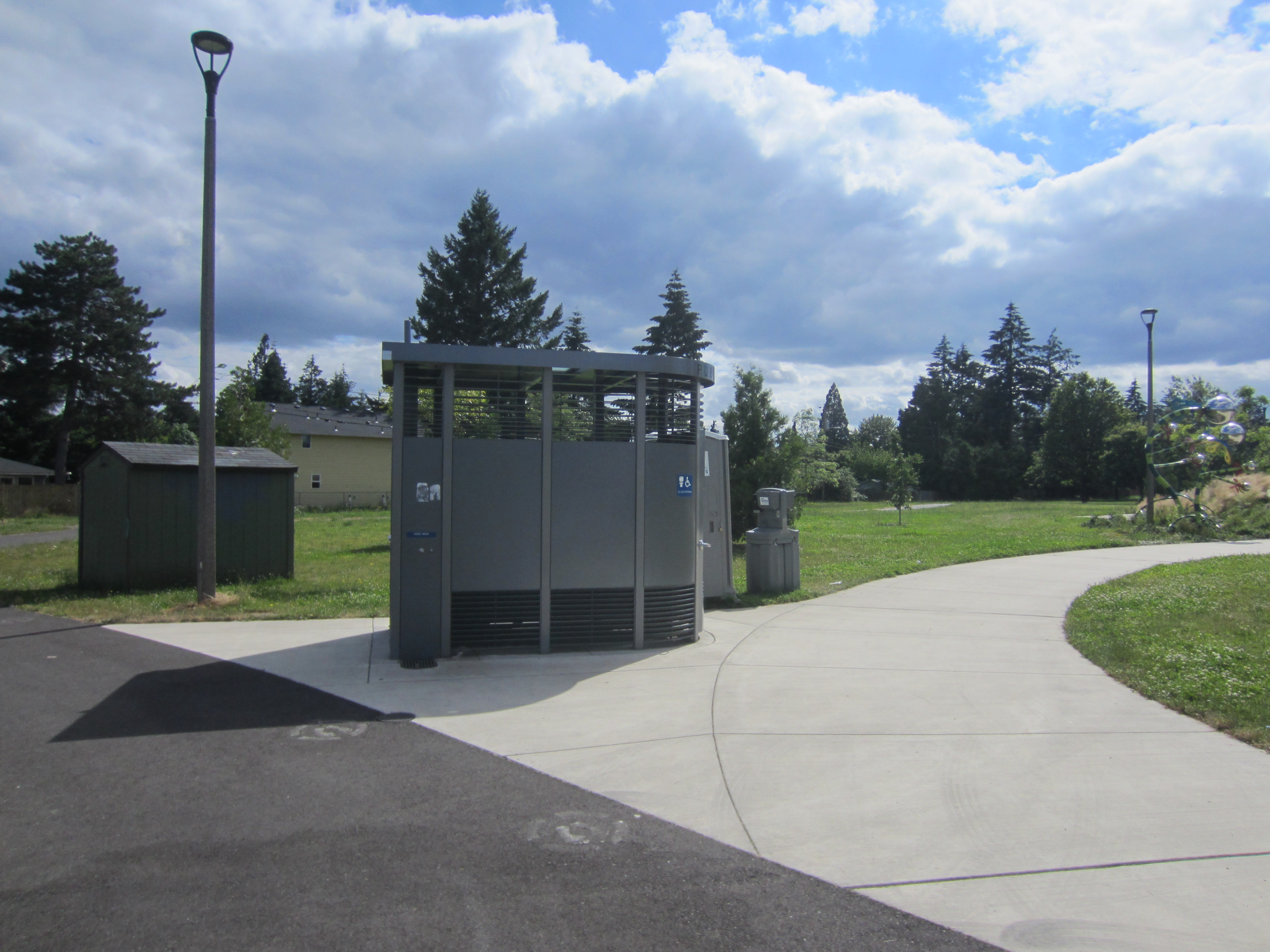
Portland Loo

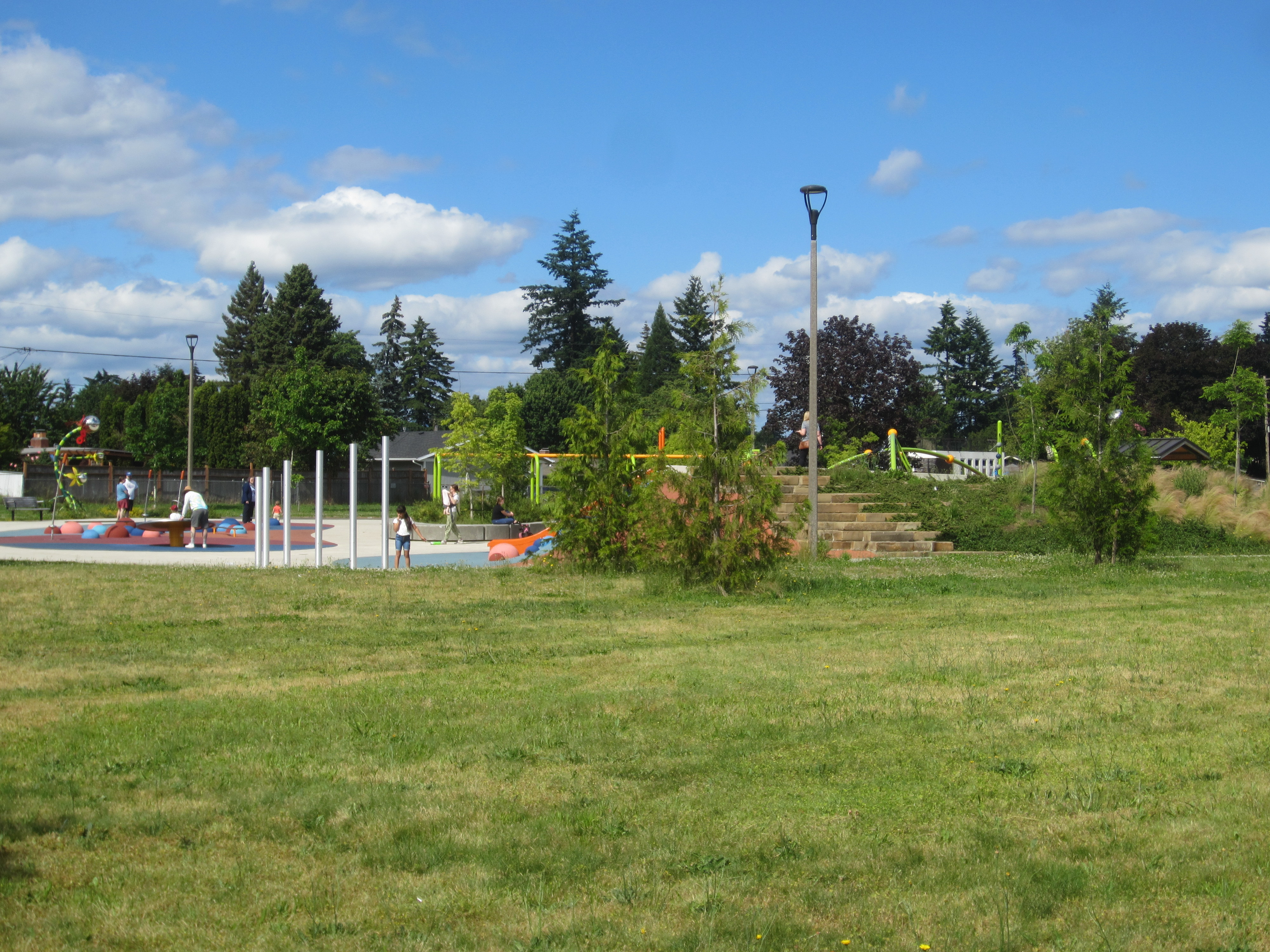
The playground

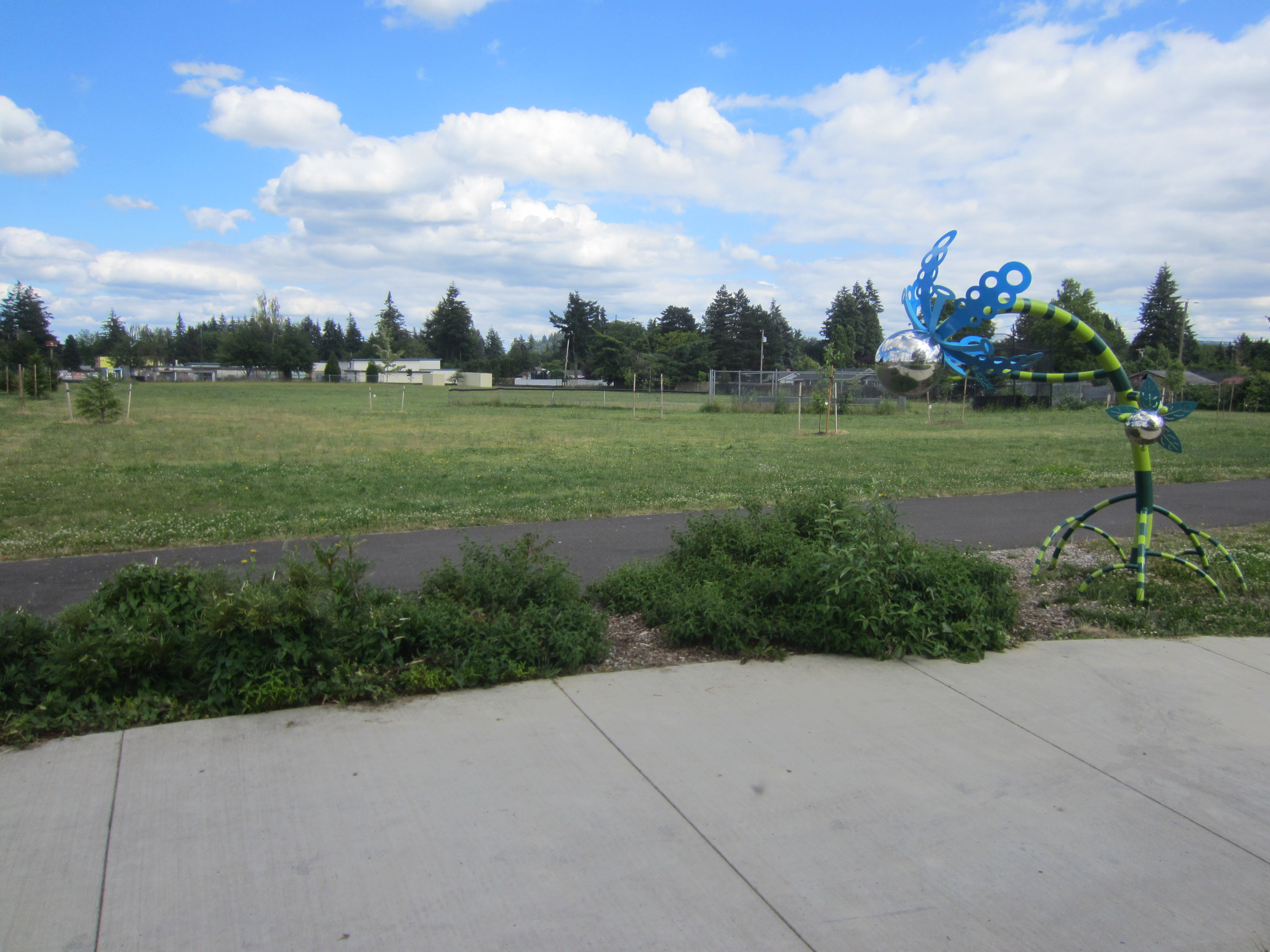

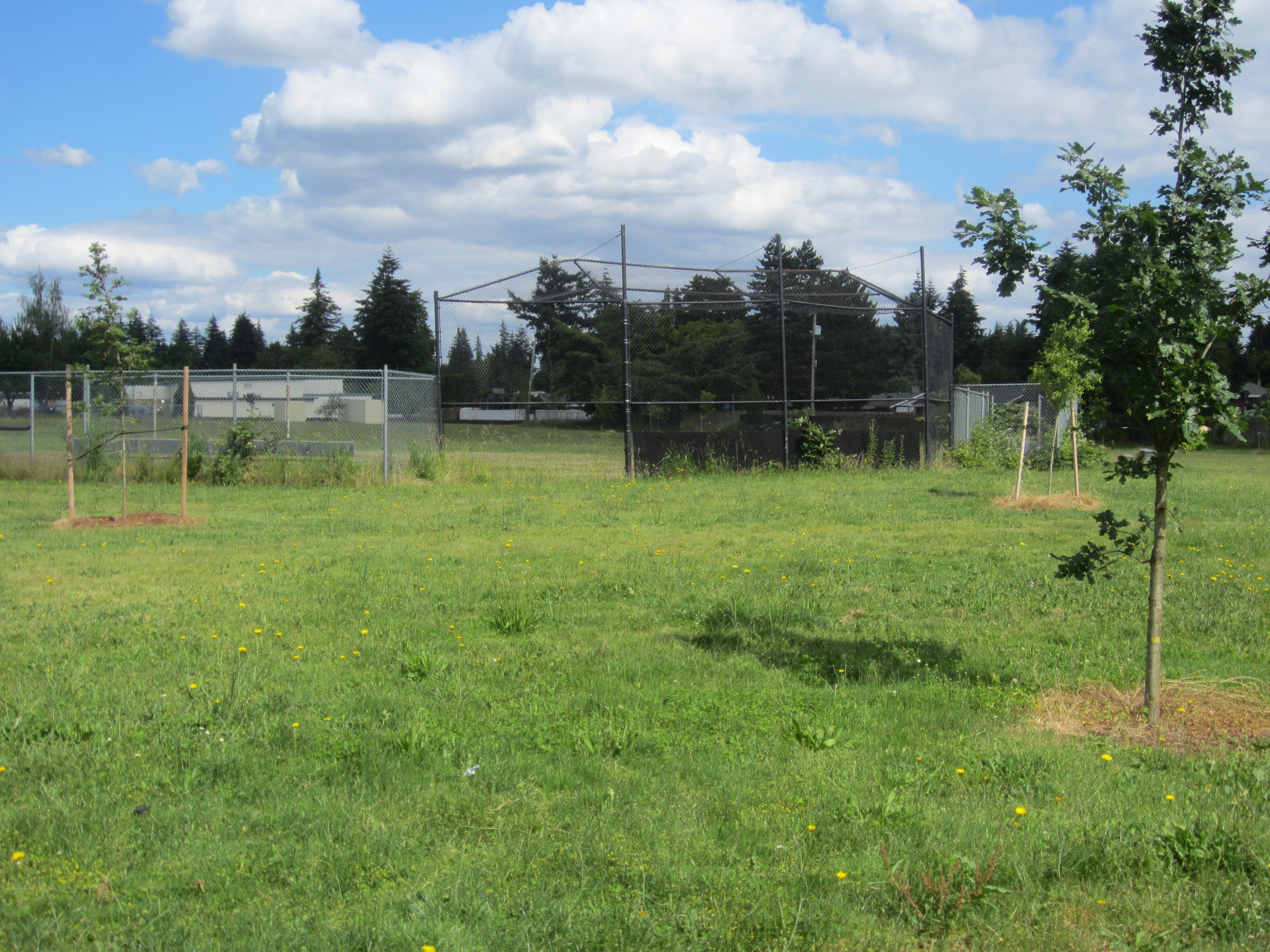
The baseball field
