= Owen Summers Jr. =

United States Army general

- Born: May 23, 1890; Portland, Oregon
- Died: April 2, 1971 (aged 80); Vancouver, Washington
- Military career
- Allegiance: United States of America
- Branch: United States Army
- Service years: 1917−1947
- Rank: Brigadier General
- Commands: 33rd Infantry Regiment and Trinidad Mobile Force
- Conflicts: World War I World War II
- Awards: Legion of Merit, Silver Star, Purple Heart, Order of St. Olav, Order of the British Empire, and Croix de Guerre

Owen Summers Jr. (May 23, 1890 – April 2, 1971) was a decorated U.S Army officer serving in both World War I and World War II.

== Early years ==
Summers was born in Portland, Oregon, the son of Brev. Brigadier General Owen Summers Sr. and Clara Summers. His father had commanded all Oregon military forces serving in the Philippines during the Spanish–American War. Educated locally in Oregon, Owen Summers Jr. received officers training and joined the 91st Infantry Division in 1917 as a second lieutenant. After training at Camp Lewis in Washington, the Division shipped off for France. Summers fought in several key battles in World War I, including the St. Mihiel Offensive in France, and the Meuse-Argonne Offensive in the final major offensive of the war. Summers was promoted to captain, and made an aide-de-camp for the division commander, General William H. Johnston. When the Division returned to the Northwest, Summers served at Vancouver Barracks in 1919. In 1920, Summers was commissioned a captain in the regular Army. After his commissioning, Summers served with several infantry divisions, received various levels of officer training, and had a tour of duty in the Philippines. In 1923 he attended the military's Infantry School, Commissioned Officers Course. In 1935, Summers attended the U.S. Army's Command and General Staff School. He was a major with the 7th Infantry Regiment at Vancouver Barracks from 1935 to 1937, serving under General George C. Marshall. He graduated from the Army War College in 1939.

== World War II service ==
In 1941, as a Colonel, Summers joined a task force that established the Trinidad Base Command in Trinidad, which was charged with defending shipping in the Caribbean against German U-boats. Initially serving as a Personnel Officer, Summer then commanded the 33rd Infantry Regiment. Late in 1941, Summers was promoted to Brigadier General, and put in command of the Trinidad Mobile Force. On July 7, 1944, Summers joined the 80th Infantry Division as the Assistant Division Commander. The 80th Division had shipped out from the United States and landed for staging in England. The division joined the already underway Normandy Invasion on August 8, 1944. Summers served in combat with the division in Northern France, Ardennes, Rhineland, and Central Europe campaigns. During this combat period General Summers received multiple Legion of Merit awards, a Silver Star, and, after being wounded, a Purple Heart. He was wounded in February, 1945, in Germany during the advance of General George Patton’s Third Army. General Summers also received the Norwegian Order of St. Olav, the Commander of the Order of the British Empire medal, and the French Croix de Guerre. In April, 1945, the general was assigned to command Task Force "A", which was to go to the Oslo Zone in Norway to disarm Germans and repatriate them to Germany. As the center of German and Norwegian administration, the Oslo command assisted in many of the arrests, imprisonments, and in some cases executions of German sympathizers and German occupational government officials. Summers returned to the United States in December, 1946, and retired from the U.S. Army in June, 1947.

After retiring, Summers and his wife moved to Vancouver, Washington.

== Civic contributions ==
He served as chairman of the blood bank program of the Clark County Red Cross Chapter from 1954 to 1957. He was a former president of the Clark County Historical Society and a former president and one of the leaders in establishing the Clark County Historical Museum. General Summers was on the board of directors of the National Historic Sites Commission, a member of the Companions of the Military Order of World Wars of Portland, a member and president of the Vancouver Rotary Club, and served on the board of directors of Junior Achievement. He was a member and vestryman of St. Luke's Episcopal Church (Vancouver, Washington) and a faithful churchman. He was Sr. Warden of the parish in 1956. In memory of General Summers, a flag was created and installed in the church that is an exact replica of the standard of the Regiment of Mounted Riflemen which arrived at Fort Vancouver on October 19, 1848.

Owen Summers Jr. died in Vancouver WA, on April 2, 1971.
