= John Luby Park =

Public park in Portland, Oregon, U.S.

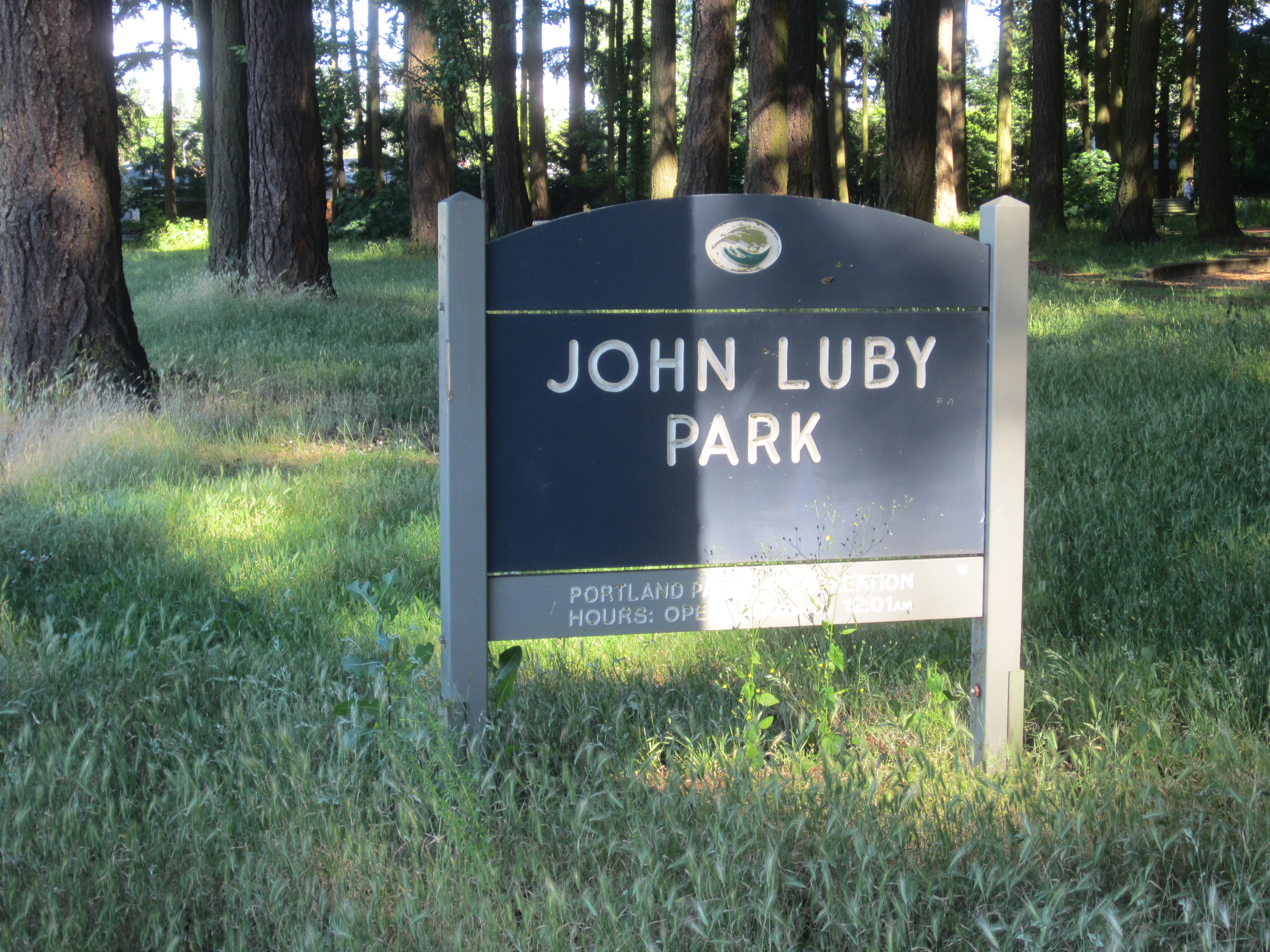
- Park sign, 2022
- Interactive map of John Luby Park
- Location: NE 128th Ave. and Brazee St. Portland, Oregon
- Coordinates: 45°32′24″N 122°31′52″W
- Area: 10.42 acres (4.22 ha)
- Operator: Portland Parks & Recreation

John Luby Park is a 10.42-acre (4.22 ha) public park in the Russell neighborhood of northeastern Portland, Oregon, United States. The park was acquired in 1985.
