= Centennial, Portland, Oregon =

Centennial
- Neighborhood
- Interactive map of Centennial
- Coordinates: 45°30′16″N 122°29′48″W
- Country: United States
- State: Oregon
- City: Portland

Government
  - Association: Centennial Community Association
  - Coalition: East Portland Neighborhood Office

Area
  - Total: 2.68 sq mi (6.95 km^{2})

Population (2020)
  - Total: 25,413
  - Density: 9,470/sq mi (3,660/km^{2})

Housing
  - No. of households: 7373
  - Occupancy rate: 95% occupied
  - Owner-occupied: 4995 households (68%)
  - Renting: 2378 households (32%)
  - Avg. household size: 2.79 persons

Centennial is a neighborhood on the eastern edge of the Southeast section of Portland, Oregon and a former census-designated place (CDP) on the border with Gresham. The neighborhood is served by the Centennial School District and is the home of Centennial High School.

The neighborhood includes Lynchwood Park, Parklane Park, and Verdell Burdine Rutherford Park (formerly known as Lynchview Park).

The unrelated Centennial, Oregon post office near Delta Park in North Portland served the Oregon statehood Centennial Exposition from June to September 1959. The neighborhood also stretches into Gresham and has a neighborhood association there.

== History ==
Prior to being annexed by Portland, the community was enumerated as a census-designated place in 1980, when it recorded a population of 22,118. The community was also part of the CDP of Powellhurst-Centennial in 1990, which the census area recorded a population of 28,756.

== Demographics ==
In 2020, 25,413 people lived in Centennial, a 7% increase from 23,662 in the 2010 census. There were 8,281 households and 8,911 housing units.

In 2020, 52.4% of people as white alone, 14.5% identified as Hispanic or Latino, 11.2% of people identified as Asian, 7.4% identified as Black or African American, 3.4% identified as American Indian or Alaskan Native, 1.6% identified as Native Hawaiian or Pacific Islander and 12.0% indicated some other race. In households that spoke limited English, 33.5% spoke Spanish, 21.2% spoke Vietnamese, 14.5% spoke Russian, Ukrainian, or other Slavic languages, and 5.1% spoke Chinese.
