= Raymond Park (Portland, Oregon) =

Public park in Portland, Oregon, U.S.

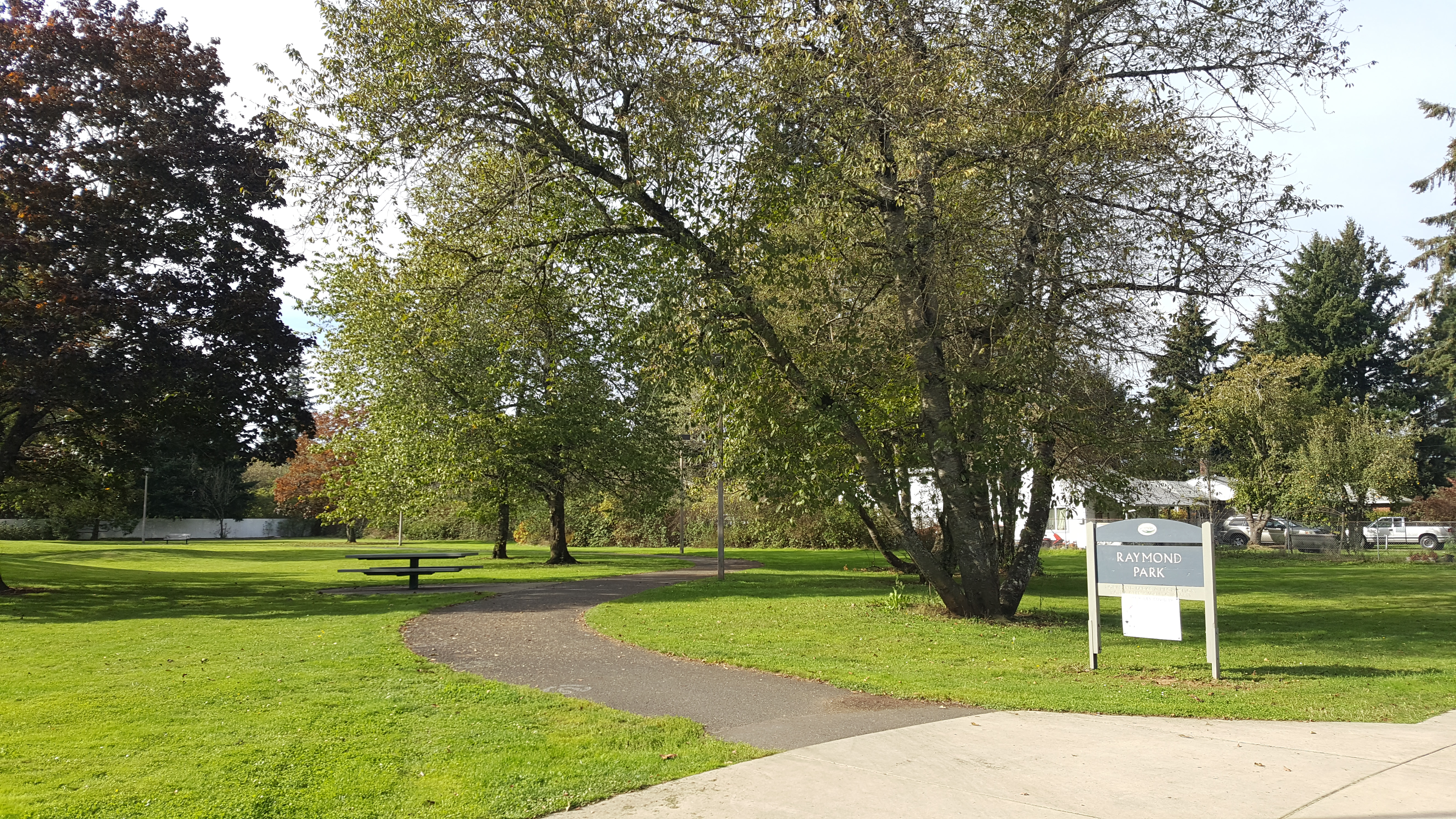
- Part of the park in 2020

- Location within Portland, Oregon
- Location: SE 118th Ave. and Raymond St. Portland, Oregon
- Coordinates: 45°29′10″N 122°32′34″W
- Area: 6.11 acres (2.47 ha)
- Operator: Portland Parks & Recreation

Raymond Park is a 6.11-acre (2.47 ha) public park in southeast Portland, Oregon's Powellhurst-Gilbert neighborhood, in the United States. The park was acquired in 1993. A Portland Loo was installed in Raymond Park in 2018.
