= Wilkes, Portland, Oregon =

Wilkes
- Neighborhood
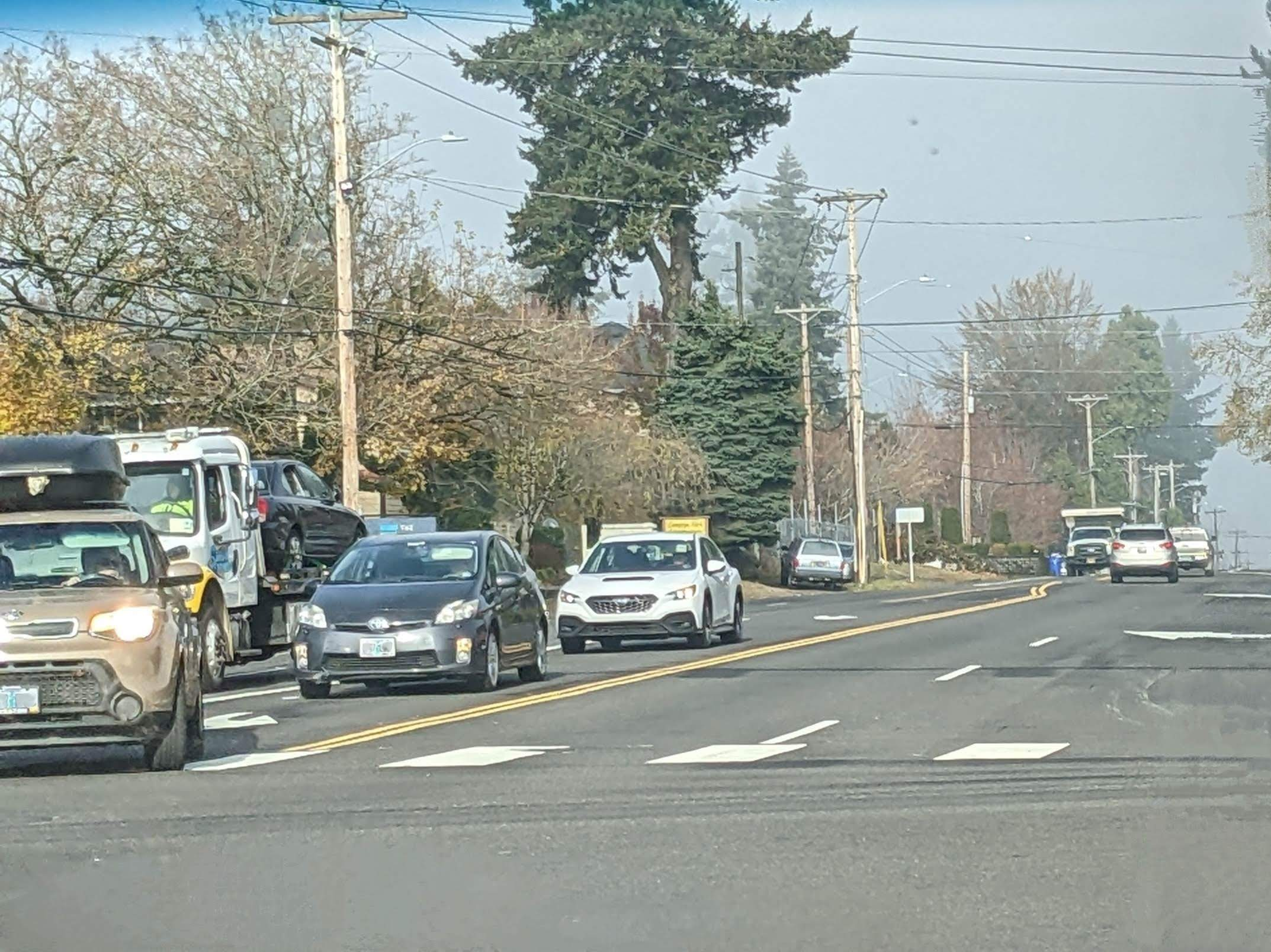
- NE 162nd Ave on the border of Gresham and Portland
- Location in Portland
- Coordinates: 45°32′N 122°30′W
- Country: United States
- State: Oregon
- City: Portland

Government
  - Association: Wilkes Community Group
  - Coalition: East Portland Neighborhood Office

Area
  - Total: 3.08 sq mi (8.0 km^{2})

Population (2020)
  - Total: 9,297
  - Density: 3,019/sq mi (1,166/km^{2})

Housing
  - No. of households: 3724
  - Occupancy rate: 95.4% occupied
  - Homeownership rate: 29%
  - Avg. household size: 2.4 persons

Wilkes is the northeasternmost neighborhood in Portland, Oregon, bordered on the north by the Columbia River and on the east by the city of Gresham, where it expands into the city as the neighborhood of Wilkes East. It adjoins the neighborhoods of Argay, Russell, and Hazelwood on the west, and Glenfair on the south. Interstate 84 runs through the middle of the neighborhood.

Wilkes is a mostly suburban and residential neighborhood in the south, but has many business parks and industrial space north of Sandy Boulevard.

== History ==
In 1850, William Wilkes, son of pioneers Payton and Anna Wilkes, took a Donation Land Claim on Sandy Road east of Portland, where the neighborhood is today. Soon afterward, he left for California during the California Gold Rush, and when he came back, bought more land to the east, what is now known as Wilkes East in Gresham. The Wilkes family also settled other areas, such as Banks and Wilkesboro in the Dairy Creek area, and were the family that John McLoughlin sent Noble Ellis up to Mt. Hood to rescue in the winter of 1847.

The first park established in the neighborhood was Wilkes Park. The land for the park was acquired in 1998 and the park was dedicated August 3, 2004. Since then, the city's parks department and its Bureau of Environmental Services partnered to acquire 20 acres (8.1 ha) of land at the headwaters of Wilkes Creek in March 2011 to create a second park and natural preservation area.

== Geography ==
Wilkes is situated in East Multnomah County. Major roads running through Wilkes include NE Marine Drive, NE Airport Way, NE Sandy Boulevard, Interstate 84, and NE Halsey Street. It is bordered on the south by NE Glisan Street, and for the most part on the east by NE 162nd Ave and on the west by NE 148th Ave. The Columbia Slough runs through the north of the neighborhood.

== Demographics ==
Historical population
Census	Pop.	Note	%±
2000	7,732		—
2010	8,781		13.6%
2020	9,297		5.9%

According to the 2020 US Census, Wilkes is non-Hispanic White 54%, Asian 13.7%, Hispanic/Latino 13.4%, Black/African American 12.8%, other 12%, American Indian/Alaska Native 3.1%, and Native Hawaiian/Pacific Islander 2%. The average income in Wilkes is $65,000, and the life expectancy is 80.1 years. About 10% of the neighborhood has limited English proficiency.
