= Portland Loo =

Unitary public toilet

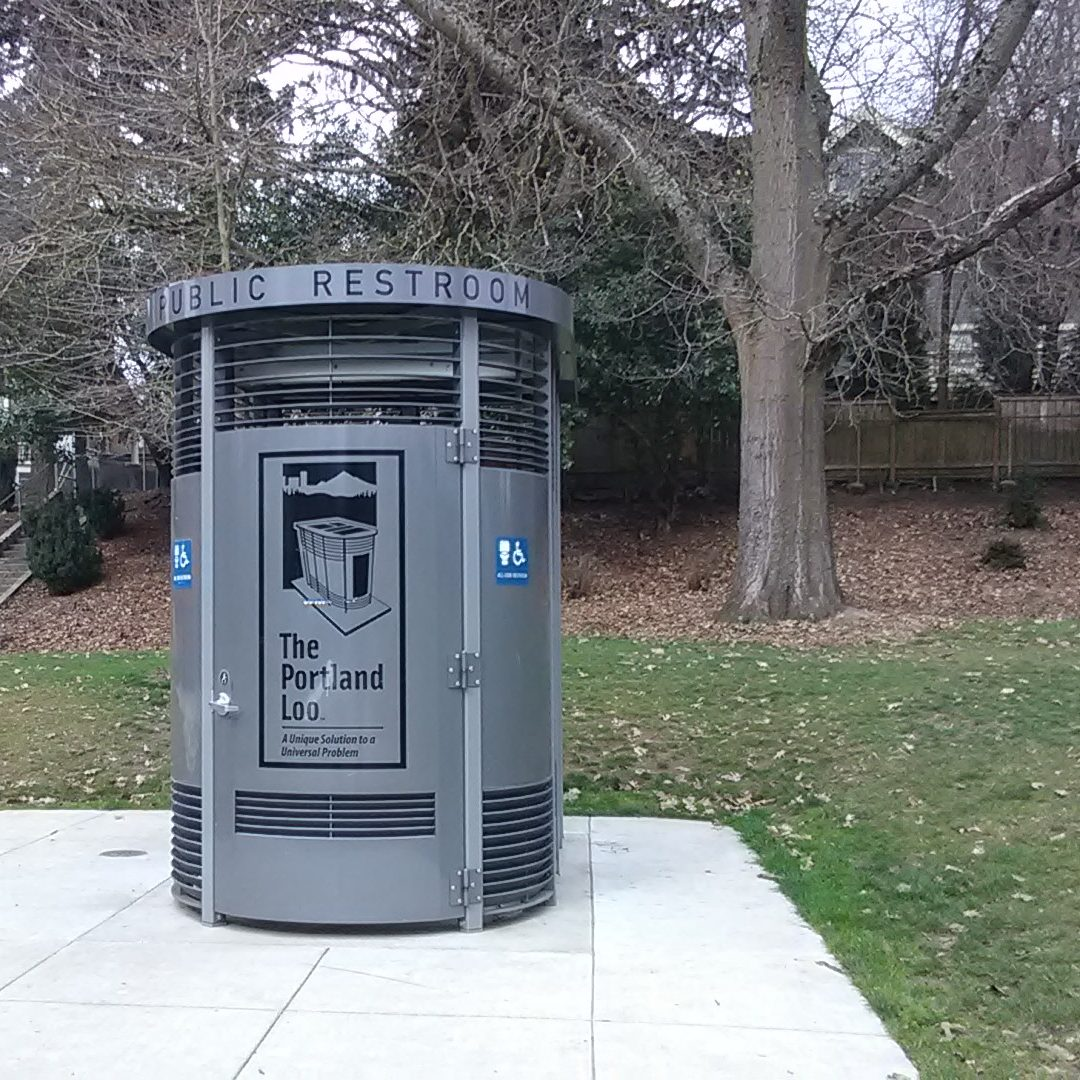
Portland Loo at Colonel Summers Park. This unit is fitted with a sharps disposal option. It was placed into service in September 2017.

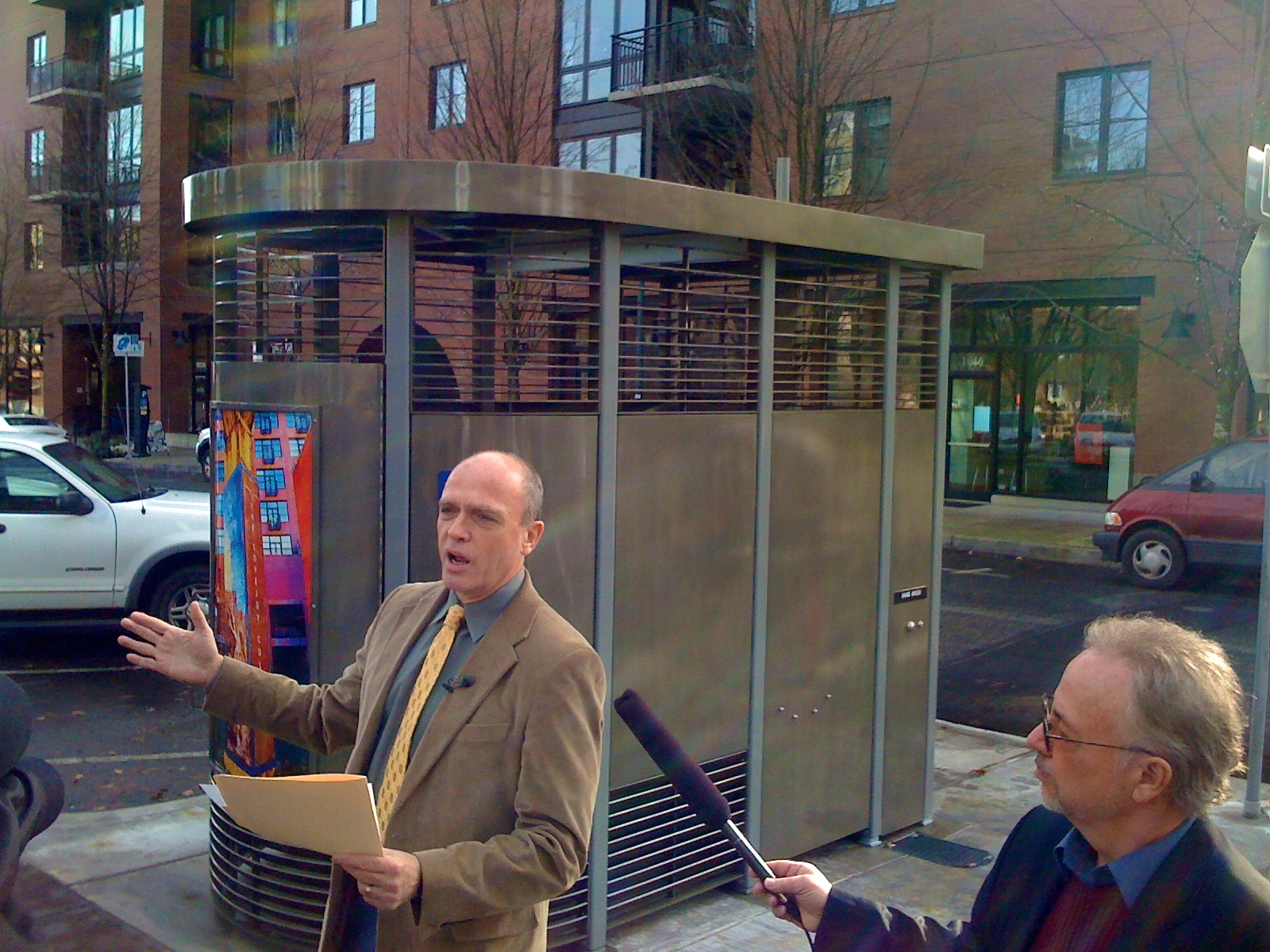
Randy Leonard alongside Portland Loo, 2010

The Portland Loo is a type of single-occupancy public toilet designed by the city of Portland, Oregon. It is manufactured, sold, and marketed by the Portland-based manufacturer Madden Fabrication under license from the city, for $96,000 each. The first unit was installed in the Old Town Chinatown neighborhood in Portland in 2008. Since the first unit was installed, additional 54 units have been purchased by February 2018, mostly by 20 other cities and 15 of them within the city of Portland.

In 2014, marketing for the restroom was transferred from the city of Portland to Madden Fabrication.

== Design and placement ==
The Portland Loo has features such as blue lighting said to make it difficult for intravenous drug users to find a vein for injection. After Portland Loos were installed in Chico, California, the Chico Enterprise-Record editorial board summarized what has worked and what didn't: they credited human attendants as the key to successful locations such as the attended locations in Los Angeles and San Francisco.

=== Features and specifications ===
The toilets can be solar powered. The interior dimensions are 6 feet (1.8 m) x 10.5 feet (3.2 m), so a user can wheel in a bicycle or baby-stroller to protect them from theft. Water consumption is 1.28 US gallons (4.8 L) per flush There is a maintenance closet in the rear that includes a hose for cleaning. One of the prefabricated loos can be installed in as little as two hours if a concrete pad on which to place the loo has been prepared in advance, complete with the utility connections.

=== Customization and options ===
Some installations have been fitted with a sharps disposal option for needles, primarily in the area with high transient activity due to the increased drug activity by homeless people. The sharps disposal is a hole above the handrail marked with the biohazard symbol and lettering "Sharps Disposal". In Portland, some units are fitted with sharps disposal receptacle, such as the one at Colonel Summers Park that was placed into service in September 2017 in the Buckman neighborhood and South Park Blocks.

== Public reception ==
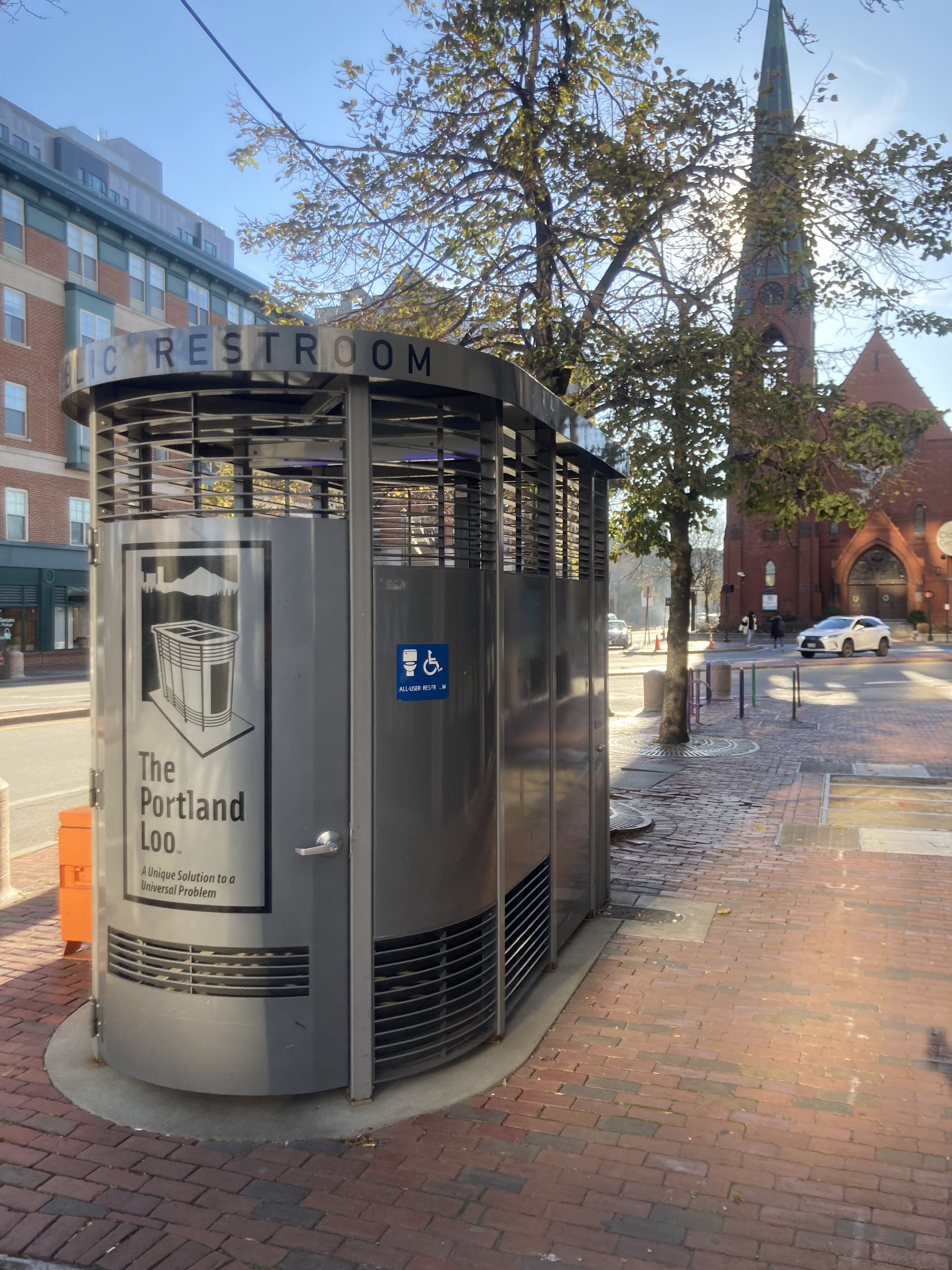
Portland Loo in Central Square, Cambridge, Massachusetts

In 2011, police officer (and future police union president) Daryl Turner characterized the existing Portland Loo in the Old Town Chinatown neighborhood in Portland described as "Randy Leonard's crack house right there" and "a favorite nighttime destination for drug dealers and prostitutes, who conduct their business behind its closed door." In 2014, National Geographic's documentary Drugs, Inc. Dope-landia featured two female transients occupying the Portland Loo at the same time and smoking methamphetamine at the Southwest Naito Parkway and Southwest Taylor Street location in downtown Portland by the Tom McCall Waterfront Park.

In mid-2016, residents near the San Diego toilet called it "a magnet for crime and homelessness". An editorial intern for the special interest magazine Yes! Magazine called criticism of the Portland Loo a focus point for "systematic denial of humanity to homeless people". San Diego officials documented an increase in police calls after Portland Loo units were installed. The calls are mostly disturbance of peace-type relating to transient people. In July 2015:

According to a memo from city Chief Operating Officer Scott Chadwick, police were called to the restroom at 14th and L streets 25 times between April and June, compared to 11 times in the same period last year — before the facility was installed. Calls at the other one climbed from 32 to 58.

In 2016, some stakeholders in Seattle's U-District expressed concerns about increase in transient people and drug activity with the proposed installation of a Portland Loo in their neighborhood.

In October 2017, Caddo Parish, Louisiana commission discussed on the proposal for installing a Portland Loo on the courthouse grounds. During the commission discussion, commissioners commented "We don't need to be doing anything to attract people to the courthouse" and "transient people are going to be on the courthouse grounds". The commission voted to move the discussion to long range planning commission.

Some business owners in San Diego expressed concerns about increase in drug and transient activity in general. The city of San Diego decommissioned one of the two Portland Loos installed due to transient activity and crime and put the removed loo up for auction on GovDeals. The city of Albuquerque purchased it for $20,000 in the summer of 2017. The unit purchased from San Diego was installed in a city parking lot at Old Town. The total cost including the purchase and installation totaled around $135,000. It was originally intended for downtown Albuquerque, however people expressed concerns about nefarious activities and did not want them near them. So, it was appropriated to Old Town which is frequented by tourists. The installation was put on hold for several years while mulling over installation locations after community concerns about usage for unintended purposes.

The loo has been praised by a homelessness advocacy group in Washington, D.C. and a columnist for Toronto Star.

In 2023, the city of Somerville, Massachusetts ordered three Portland Loos, but before installation discovered they were not in compliance with the Massachusetts Building Code. The manufacturer decided to redesign its toilets for compliance with the building codes of Massachusetts and other states.

=== Entrapment incident ===
In Evansville, Indiana, a person was trapped inside the unit due to a door handle malfunction likely due to a defective lockset. The Portland Loo in question was installed at an expense of $275,000 to the city.

== Intellectual property ==
The Portland Loo is reportedly the "brainchild" of a former Portland commissioner Randy Leonard, who obtained a design patent on the stainless steel design in 2008.

When the city of Portland commissioned the design of the toilet, it retained the intellectual property rights to the design, and would receive a royalty from the manufacturer, for each unit it sold. Press reports described this arrangement as a source of funds, for the city. In August 2013, the municipal corporation city of Portland sued a Roseburg, Oregon manufacturer Romtec that has been manufacturing a similar product for infringement. A settlement was reached to end the infringement lawsuit. The terms allow Romtec to continue to make and sell their Sidewalk Restroom for 25 years, but subject to a royalty payment at the rate of 8% of selling price payable to the city of Portland.

In 2014, a citizen group sued the city, asserting the city had spent over $600,000 to promote the loos, without proper authorization. The city of Portland had exited its role in sales and marketing of the Portland Loo. It has leased the rights to use and market the design to Madden for 25 years in exchange for 8% royalty payment to the city.

In November 2019, KATU News reports Madden's 8% Portland Loo royalty payment since 2014 to the City of Portland totaled $363,323.

== Society and culture ==
=== In popular culture ===
The loos have been featured in the television show Portlandia, and fans seek them out, for photo-ops, when they visit Portland.

== Similar systems ==
In 2018 Vernon, British Columbia planned to purchase Portland loos, but withdrew after being placed on a waiting list, so had a local firm design a similar system.

Montreal has its own design called Montreal TMAX.

== List of locations ==
Cities that have purchased one or more Portland loos
City	Year	Qty	Notes
Portland, Oregon	2008	15	Portland's first loo was installed in 2008. The city had 15 loos by 2018. Six of the downtown toilets are generally open 24/7. The remainder follow park hours and may close seasonally.
Victoria, British Columbia	2012	2	Victoria was the first city, after Portland, to install a loo.
Nanaimo, British Columbia	2013	1	The second loo ordered from Canada.
Esquimalt, BC	2013	2	
Ketchikan, Alaska	2014	1	Called Stedman-Thomas Neighborhood Loo
Arcata, California	2014	1	
Cincinnati, Ohio	2015		Political activists had been calling for improved access to public toilets since 2011.; Cincinnati had considered, and rejected, an alternate plan to provide public toilets, in 2013.
San Diego, California	2015	1	San Diego installed two loos in 2015, and removed one after a reported increase in crime rates and maintenance costs.; A transient interviewed by a Union-Tribune reporter shared his observation that it was rare to find feces on the streets until the removal of Portland Loo.
Monterey, California	2015	1	The loo was placed outside of Monterey California's major transit hub.; The loo was judged a success, and the Monterey-Salinas Transit is considering purchasing another.
Cambridge, Massachusetts	2016	2	A broad coalition of groups had been lobbying for Cambridge to replace the public washrooms that were closed by the city in 2012.; The first Portland Loo in the Boston area was installed just outside the main entrance to Harvard University.; The second loo in Cambridge was installed at the expense of $320,000 after a citizen initiative in Central Square.
Dunedin, New Zealand	2016	1	The loo was installed in 2016 at the top of a steep street with a scenic view popular with tourists from cruise ships. Previously, the area had no public toilet and human waste was an issue for local residents.
Missoula, Montana	2017		
Montreal, Quebec	2017	1	Montreal's loo is just one of a dozen new public toilets the city ordered in 2017.
Olympia, Washington	2017	1	At Artesian Commons
San Antonio, Texas	2017	2	By the time the second loo was installed, the San Antonio Police credited the first loo with a significant decrease in human waste polluting city streets.
Emeryville, California	2017	1	Emeryville's loo installation prompted calls for nearby Oakland and Berkeley to follow its example.
Smithers, British Columbia	2017	1	The Smithers loo was the first to be adapted to make sure its pipes don't freeze during especially cold winter days.
Nelson, British Columbia	2017	1	Open 7 a.m. to 11 p.m. in conjunction with other toilets during the busy summer tourist season. May open other seasons if deemed necessary.
Austin, Texas			Two units will be installed at the expense of $450,000 and scheduled to open in November 2019.
Albuquerque, New Mexico	2017	1	Installed in 2020 at The Plaza Vieja public parking lot in Old Town after being purchased at auction in 2017.
Vancouver, British Columbia	2018	5	According to the Portland Tribune "a Portland Loo in Vancouver, B.C. was voted the best public toilet in Canada in 2012."; Vancouver had 5 loos by 2018.
Vancouver, Washington	2018	2	The loos come equipped with both a baby-changing table, and "sharps" disposal bin. City authorities reported that using ordinary port-a-potties as public toilets represented a threat to maintenance workers, as there was no safe place to dispose of used syringes.
Galveston, Texas		5	Galveston had 5 loos by 2018.; Galveston's loos are near its seawall and all include an outdoor shower for bathers.
Miami, Florida			Operated 12 hours a day with an attendant.
Kamloops, British Columbia	2018	2	
Garberville, California			
Ventura, California	2018	1	The county's older toilets had been a target of vandalism, to which a Portland Loo was seen as less vulnerable.
Seattle, Washington	2019	3	The city of Seattle installed single-occupancy self cleaning toilets in 2003 in Pioneer Square. They were removed in 2008, with city officials commenting that the project failed because they were placed into "neighborhoods that already had many drug users and transients."; Seattle first installed two Portland Loos in Rainier Beach Playfield, and installed its third in Ballard Commons Park in 2019.
Sacramento, California	2019	1	To be installed in Cesar Chavez Park.
Shoreline, Washington	c. 2019, 2023	2	One at Aurora Village Transit Center, one at Echo Lake Park
Salt Lake City, Utah		2	At 500 West and 200 South, Downtown Salt Lake City, near Old GreekTown station
Reno, Nevada	2020	1	Installed along a scenic trail overlooking the Truckee River.
Grand Rapids, Michigan	2020	1	Installed in the Heartside neighborhood.
Kalamazoo, Michigan	2020	1	Officials listed the COVID-19 pandemic as a reason for installing a Portland loo.
Kelowna, British Columbia	2021	1	Installation of a Portland Loo in Rowcliffe Park was completed in early 2021.
Santa Rosa, California	2021	1	In front of the City Hall Annex at 94 Santa Rosa Ave.
Greenfield, Massachusetts	2023	1	At the skate park located at 71 Chapman St.
Kirkland, Washington	c. 2022	2	On Cross Kirkland Corridor at Feriton Spur Park
Philadelphia, Pennsylvania	2023	6	Installed in Center City at 15th & Arch and gradually at five other public parks around the city.
Asheville, North Carolina	2024	1	
Berkeley, California	2025	1	On Tuesday Feb. 11 2025 the City of Berkeley will open a new, permanent 24-hour ADA accessible public restroom on Telegraph Avenue.
Washington, D.C.	2026	1	On Saturday Feb. 28, 2026, Washington DC's Department of Parks and Recreation opened the city's first Portland Loo in Walter Pierce Park.
Evansville, Indiana	2026	1	On Tuesday May 13, 2026, the City of Evansville has officially opened its first Portland Loo 24/7 public restroom, located at the corner of Sycamore and 6th Street, adjacent to the METS bus station.

== See also ==
- Automatic self-clean toilet seat
- Unisex public toilet
