= Colonel Summers Park =

Public park in Portland, Oregon, U.S.

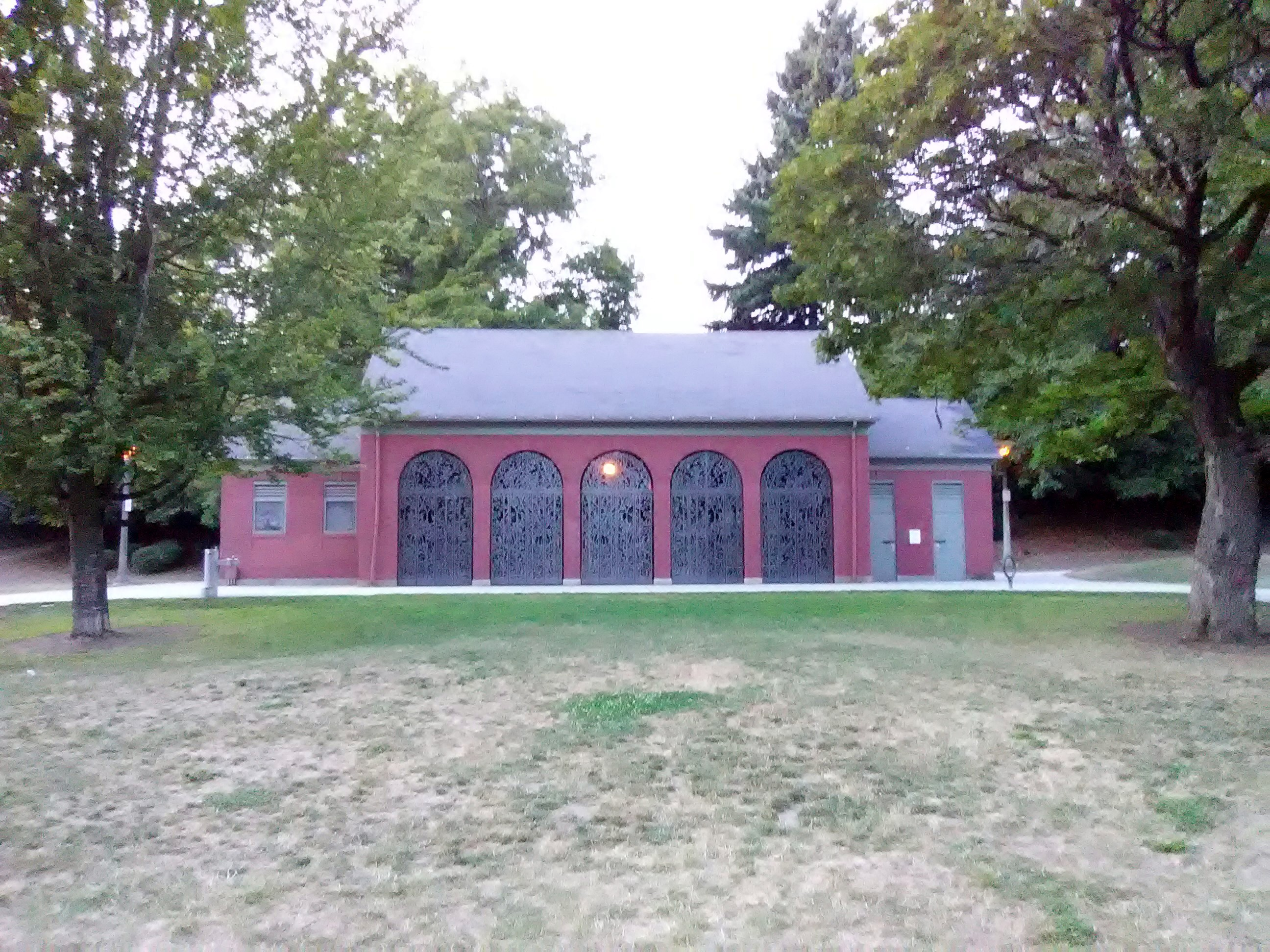
- Colonel Summers Park pavilion in August 2019
- Interactive map of Colonel Summers Park
- Type: Urban park
- Location: SE 17th Ave. and Taylor St. Portland, Oregon
- Coordinates: 45.5155°N 122.647°W
- Area: 5.99 acres (2.42 ha)
- Operator: Portland Parks & Recreation
- Open: 5 am to 10 pm daily
- Website: https://www.portland.gov/parks/colonel-summers-park

Colonel Summers Park is a city park in the Buckman of southeast Portland, Oregon, USA. The park was created in 1921 and was originally called Belmont Park for Belmont Street which runs east–west on its boundary. In 1938, it was renamed in honor of Colonel Owen Summers who, as an Oregon legislator, introduced a bill that combined the state militia units into the Oregon National Guard. Summers was the commanding officer of a volunteer regiment in the Spanish–American War, which served in forty-two engagements during the war. The park includes recreation areas and a community garden added in 1975.

== Amenities ==
Amenities include a picnic area, basketball court, paved paths, picnic shelter, reservable picnic site, picnic tables, playground, softball field, statue or public art, tennis backboard, tennis court and volleyball court. In the southwest corner of the park, there is a large rock with Colonel Owen Summers plaque attached. The rock came from Kelly Butte.

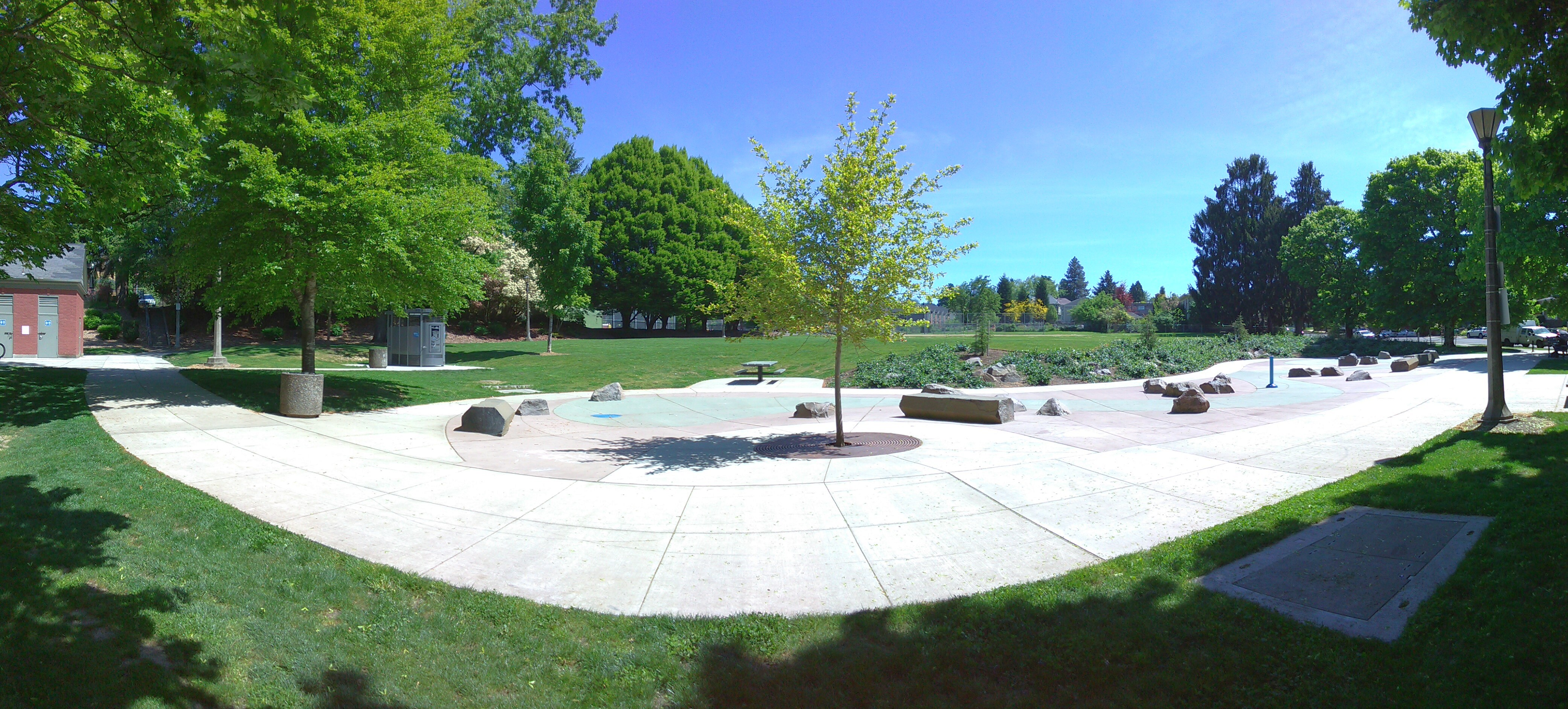
Splash pad completed in September 2017

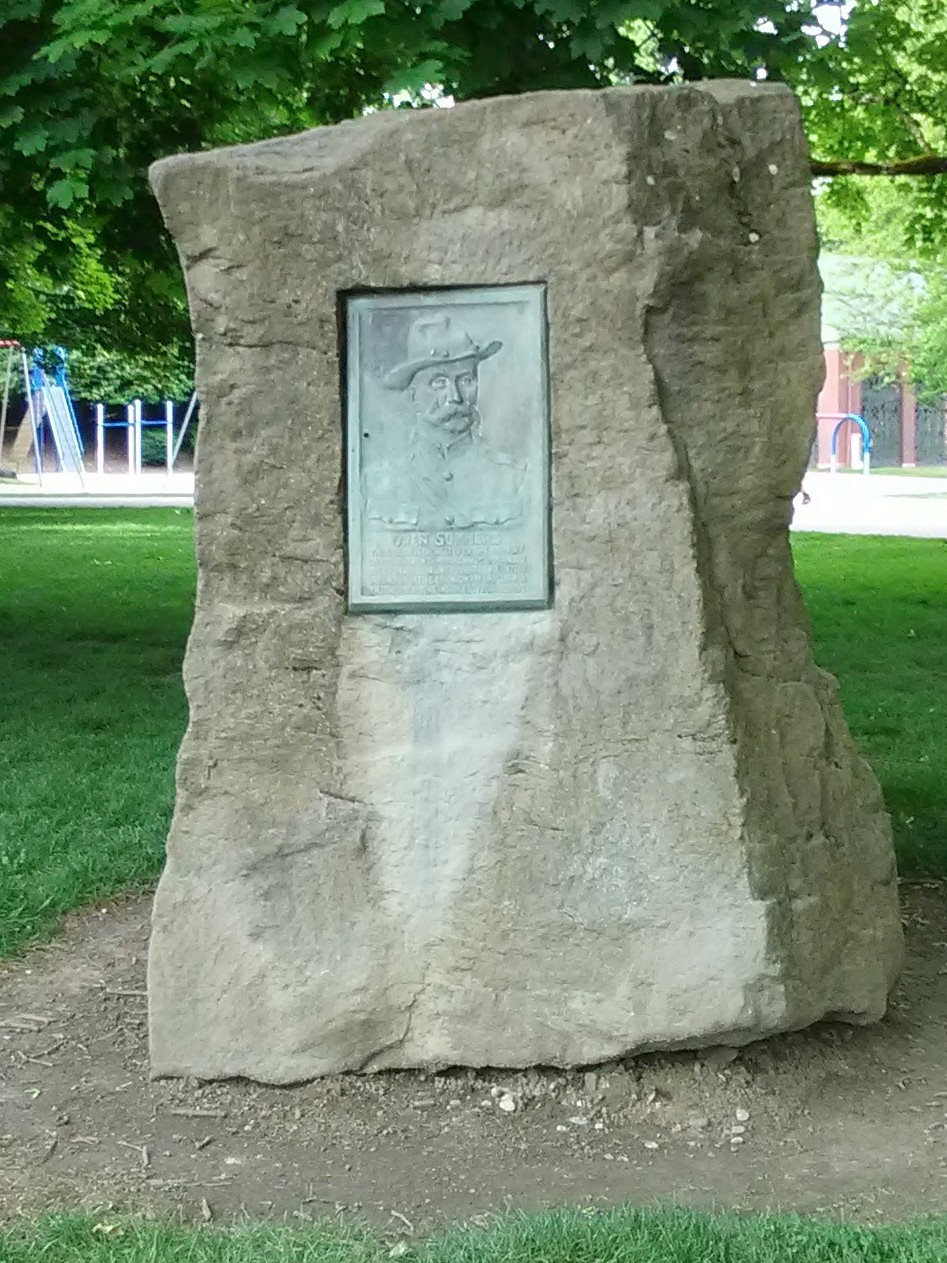
Colonel Owen Summers plaque at the southwest corner of the park

== History ==
The park was originally opened as Belmont Park. It was renamed to the current name in 1938 in honor of Colonel Owen Summers who was a former Oregon Legislature member.

In May 2013, complaints about crime, underage drinking and drug activity at the park prompted a community meeting, before which the parks department issued a statement that it had been working with the Oregon Liquor Control Commission and the Portland Police Bureau. At the meeting, Portland Parks & Recreation, the police and Buckman residents discussed eliminating the outlaws and maintaining the community appeal.

== See also ==
- List of parks in Portland, Oregon
