= Glenfair Park =

Public park in Portland, Oregon, U.S.

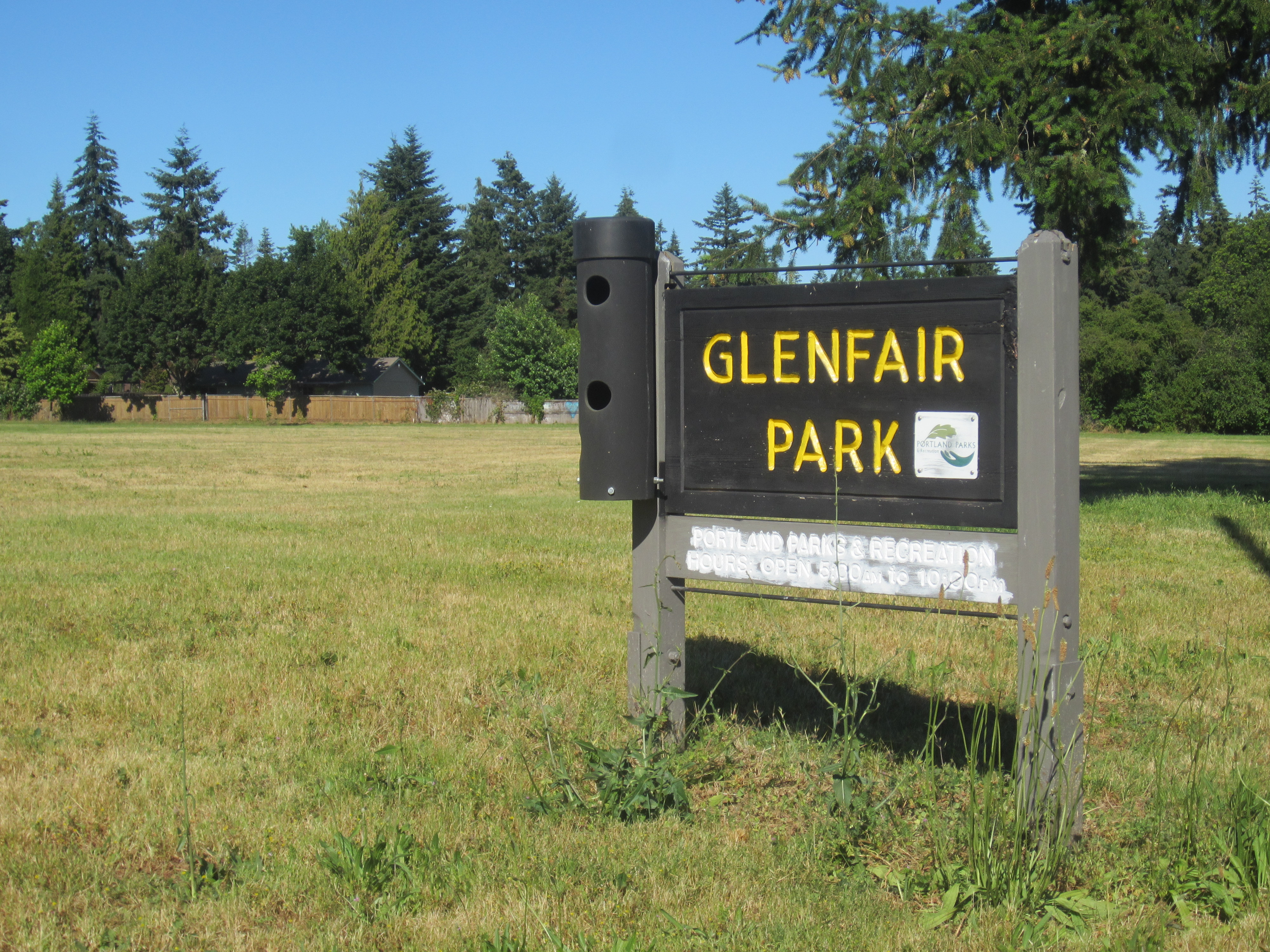
- Park sign, 2022
- Interactive map of Glenfair Park
- Location: NE 154th Ave. and Davis St. Portland, Oregon
- Coordinates: 45°31′27″N 122°30′19″W
- Area: 4.74 acres (1.92 ha)
- Created: 1989
- Operator: Portland Parks & Recreation

Glenfair Park is a 4.74-acre (1.92 ha) public park in northeastern Portland, Oregon. The park was acquired in 1989.
