= Randy Leonard =

American politician (born 1952)

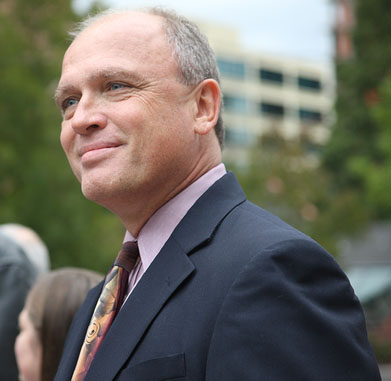
- Leonard in 2013

Portland City Commissioner
- In office November 2002 – December 31, 2012
- Preceded by: Charlie Hales
- Succeeded by: Steve Novick
- Constituency: Portland, Oregon

Member of the Oregon House of Representatives from the 21st district
- In office 1999–2002
- Preceded by: Lonnie J. Roberts
- Succeeded by: Billy Dalto

Member of the Oregon Senate from the 9th district
- In office 1993–1999
- Preceded by: Frank L. Roberts
- Succeeded by: Frank Shields

Personal details
- Born: 1952 (age 73–74) Portland, Oregon
- Party: Democratic
- Education: Portland State University, B.S., History

Charles Randall ‘Randy’ Leonard (born 1952) is a politician in the U.S. state of Oregon. He was a member of the Oregon Legislative Assembly from 1993 to 2002 and served as a city commissioner in Portland (a member of the Portland City Council) from 2002 through 2012.

== Career ==
Prior to serving in Portland city government, Leonard served in the Oregon Legislative Assembly and was a lieutenant with the Portland Fire Bureau.

In 1985, Leonard was elected President of the Portland Firefighters Association. He was elected as the Portland Firefighters President four times, serving in that position until 1998.

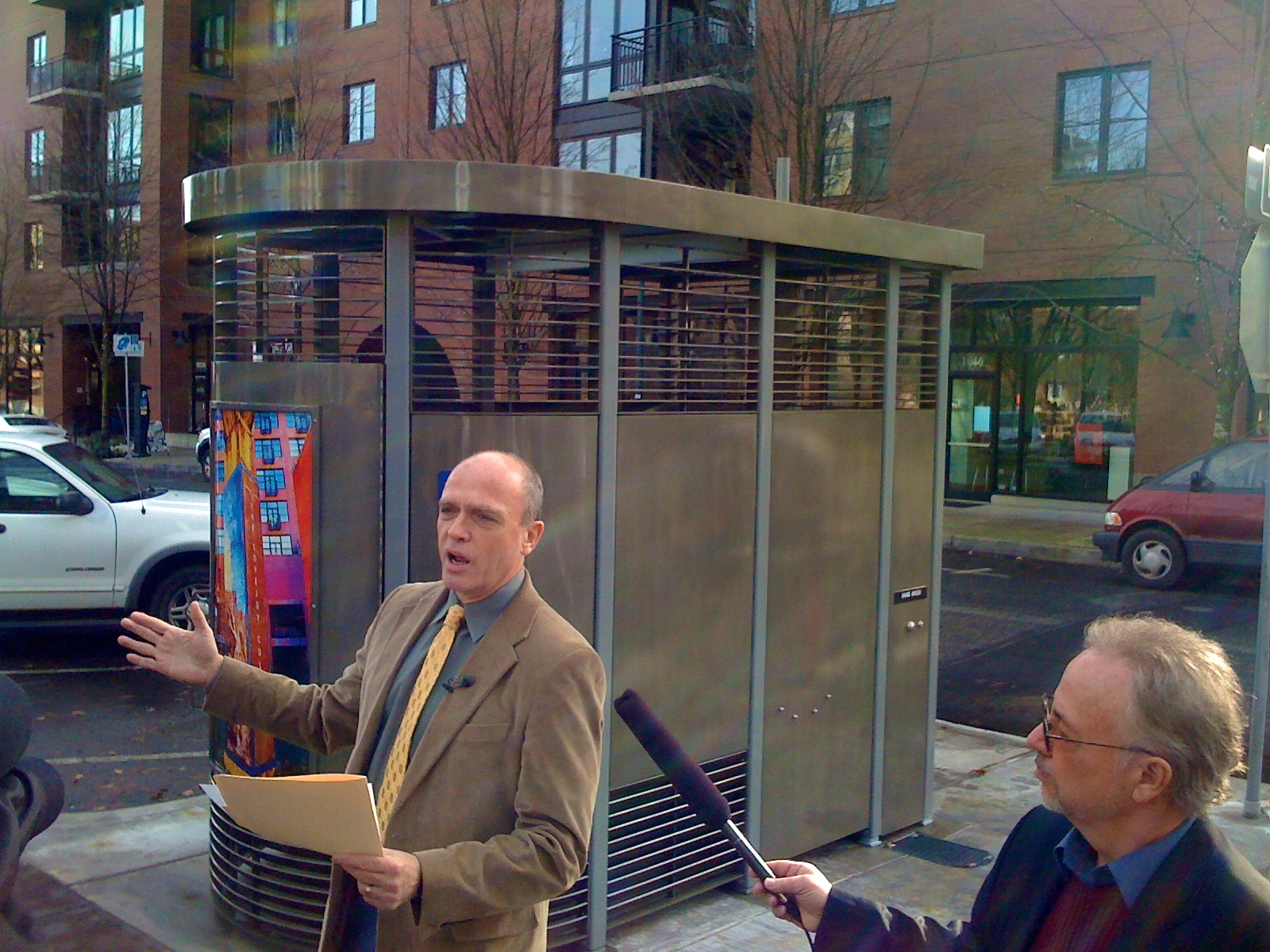
Leonard next to a Portland Loo.

In 1993, he was appointed to the Oregon State Senate to serve Multnomah County in District 9 by the Multnomah County Board of Commissioners. In 1994 he was elected to the Senate for a four-year term. In 1998, because of term limits, Leonard became the first person in Oregon history to run for the Oregon House of Representatives while serving as a sitting State Senator. A Democrat, he served in the Senate and Oregon House of Representatives from 1993 through the 2002 special sessions of the legislature.

Leonard was elected to the Portland City Council in 2002, in a special election held to fill a vacancy caused by the resignation of then-commissioner Charlie Hales. He was sworn in as a Portland city commissioner in front of the Smith Memorial Center in the South Park Blocks on November 26, 2002, by city auditor Gary Blackmer. He was re-elected in 2004 and 2008.

While serving on the Portland City Council, Leonard was the appointed by the Mayor to be the administrative head of a number of different city bureaus, including the Portland Fire Bureau. Leonard was the Commissioner-in-charge of the Fire Bureau during his final four years on the city council.

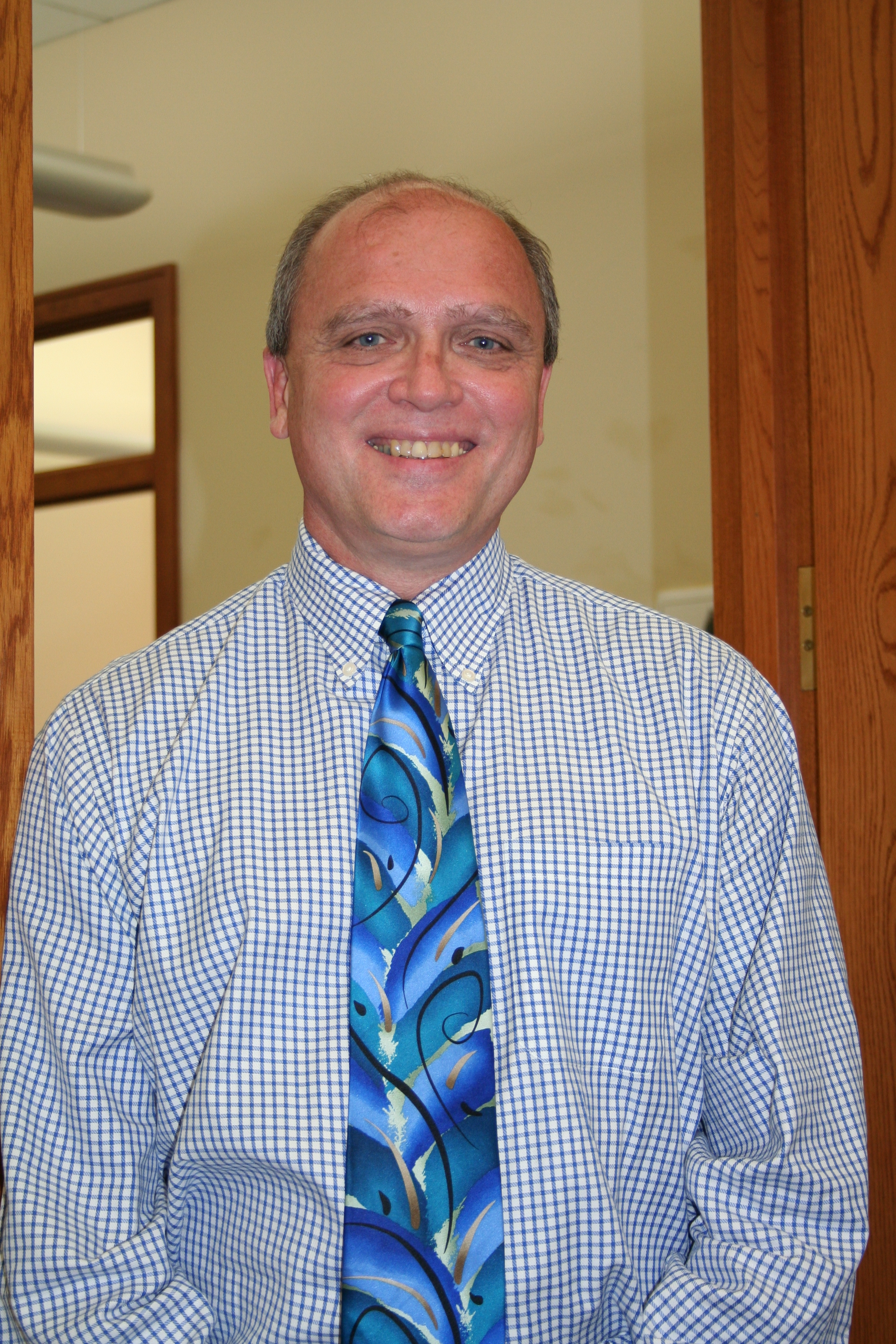
Randy Leonard.

In 2011, Leonard announced that he would not run for re-election in 2012, and his final term on the city council ended on December 31, 2012.

== Personal life ==
Leonard married his wife, Katie, in 2010.

On May 8, 2011, Leonard's daughter, 31-year-old Kara Marie Leonard, died. She had struggled for several years with addiction, achieving brief episodes of sobriety with her father's help; he spoke publicly of her addiction in the 2007 documentary Finding Normal.

== See also ==
- Portland Loo
