= Henry Anton Erikson =

Henry Anton Erikson (July 30, 1869 in Mount Morris, Wisconsin – June 22, 1957) was an American physicist and long-time chairman of the Department of Physics at the University of Minnesota. He is known for his research on atmospheric ionization and gas conductivity, as well as his mentorship of younger physicists, including Nobel laureate Arthur Compton.

== Biography ==
Erikson earned his B.E.E. in 1896 and his Ph.D. in physics in 1908, both from the University of Minnesota. He joined the faculty of the University of Minnesota, serving as the head of the Physics Department from 1915 until his retirement in 1938. Under his leadership, the department expanded its research facilities and experimental laboratories.

He passed away in 1957.

== Selected publications ==
- Erikson, Henry A. (1912). Elements of Mechanics. New York: McGraw-Hill.
- Erikson, Henry A. (1926). Physical Measurements. New York: McGraw-Hill.
