= Wisconsin Highway 152 =

State highway in Wisconsin, United States

State Trunk Highway 152
- WIS 152 highlighted in red

Route information
- Maintained by WisDOT
- Length: 7.22 mi (11.62 km)

Major junctions
- West end: WIS 21 / WIS 73 in Wautoma
- East end: CTH-G / CTH-W in Mt. Morris

Location
- Country: United States
- State: Wisconsin
- Counties: Waushara

Highway system
- Wisconsin State Trunk Highway System; Interstate; US; State; Scenic; Rustic
← US 151	→ WIS 153

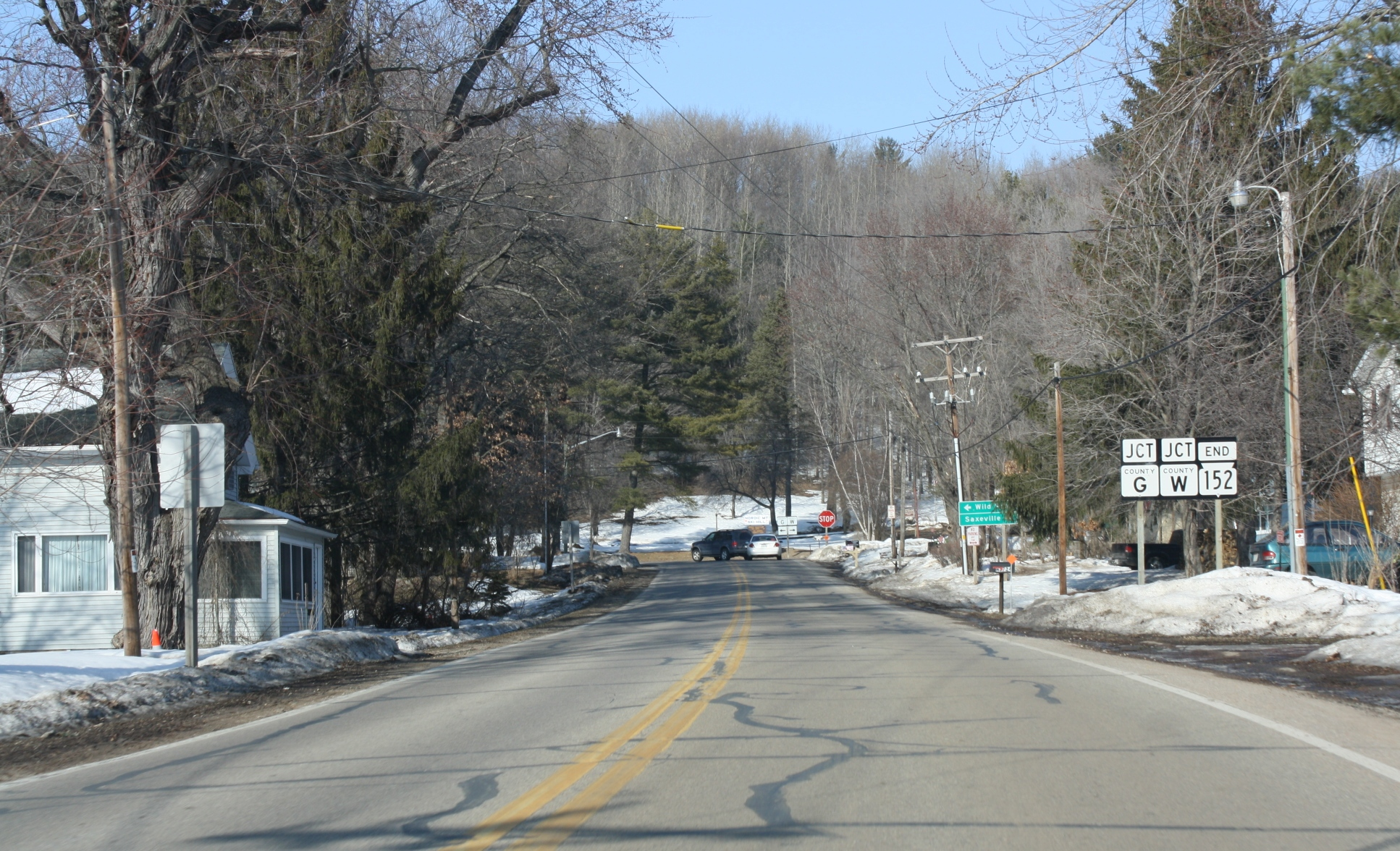
Eastern terminus in Mount Morris

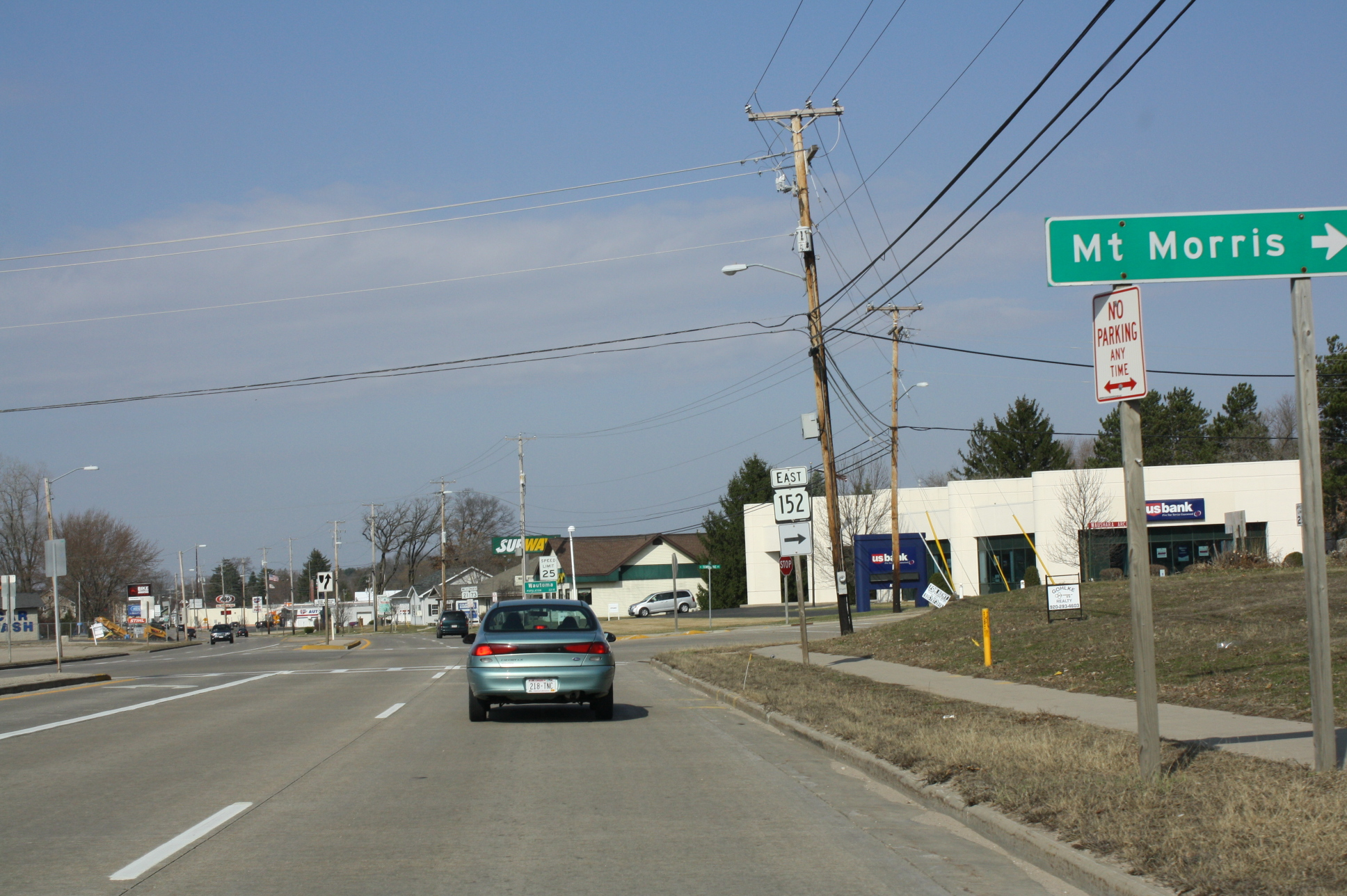
Western terminus in Wautoma

State Trunk Highway 152 (often called Highway 152, STH-152 or WIS 152) is a state highway in the U.S. state of Wisconsin. It runs in east–west in east-central Wisconsin from Wautoma to Mount Morris.

== Route description ==
The highway begins at the intersection of Townline Road and East Main Street (WI 73/WI 21) in Wautoma. It continues north for a short distance before turning right at East Mount Morris Avenue and continuing east from its intersection with North Townline Road. The route continues northeast through the town of Wautoma before running northward and terminating at county highways G and W in the community of Mount Morris.

== Major intersections ==
The entire highway is in Waushara County.

Location	mi	km	Destinations	Notes
Wautoma	0.0	0.0	WIS 21 / WIS 73 (E Main Street)	
Town of Wautoma	5.6	9.0	CTH-S	
Mount Morris	7.2	11.6	CTH-G north / CTH-W east	
1.000 mi = 1.609 km; 1.000 km = 0.621 mi
