= Wisconsin Highway 21 =

Highway in Wisconsin

State Trunk Highway 21
- WIS 21 highlighted in red

Route information
- Maintained by WisDOT
- Length: 123.37 mi (198.54 km)

Major junctions
- West end: WIS 16 / WIS 27 / WIS 71 in Sparta
- I-94 / US 12 in Tomah; WIS 13 near Friendship; I-39 / US 51 in Coloma; I-41 / US 41 in Oshkosh
- East end: US 45 in Oshkosh

Location
- Country: United States
- State: Wisconsin
- Counties: Monroe, Juneau, Adams, Waushara, Winnebago

Highway system
- Wisconsin State Trunk Highway System; Interstate; US; State; Scenic; Rustic
| ← WIS 20 | → WIS 22 |

State Trunk Highway 21 (often called Highway 21, STH-21 or WIS 21) is a state highway in the U.S. state of Wisconsin. It runs east–west across the center of the state between Sparta and Oshkosh. The highway often serves as a direct route for travelers between Appleton and Oshkosh to Tomah and La Crosse. It is a two-lane surface road for nearly all of its length, with the exception of a few urban arterials of four or more lanes. The section of WIS 21 between Fort McCoy and I-94 in Tomah is classified as a "Major STRAHNET Connector", while the route past I-94 is classified as a "Non-Interstate STRAHNET Route".

== Route description ==
WIS 21 begins at the intersection of WIS 16, WIS 71 and WIS 27. The highway then follows WIS 16/WIS 71, running concurrently east for about 1/2 mile (0.80 km) before turning north off the concurrency. WIS 21 proceeds northeast, following the La Crosse River and passes through Fort McCoy. The highway then turns eastward and follows alongside the Tarr and Sparta creeks, passing through Tunnel City. WIS 21 crosses US Highway 12 (US 12) and Interstate 94 (I-94) on the north side of Tomah. The highway continues east from there to junction with WIS 173 west of Wyeville and then crosses into Juneau County. WIS 21 passes through the Necedah National Wildlife Refuge during its 12-mile (19 km) stretch of straight route to Necedah. The highway crosses WIS 80 within Necedah and crosses the Wisconsin River at about three miles (4.8 km) east of the village. WIS 21 enters Adams County at the river, just south of Petenwell Lake. WIS 21 junctions with WIS 13 three miles (4.8 km) north of Friendship. The highway also provides indirect access to Roche-a-Cri State Park via WIS 13.

WIS 21 crosses I-39 and US 51 at Coloma in Waushara County. The highway passes through the village just east of the Interstate. After passing through Richford at County Trunk Highway B (CTH-B), WIS 21 gradually curves northward to junction with CTH-Y—where it turns sharply eastward and junctions with WIS 22 and WIS 73 north in Wautoma. WIS 21 follows WIS 73 south for two miles (3,200 m) before turning east again of the concurrency near Silver Lake. WIS 152 junctions with the routes about two miles (3.2 km) northwest of the eastern concurrency terminus. The highway passes through Lohrville and Redgranite and junctions with WIS 49 south of Auroraville.

WIS 21 enters Winnebago County five miles (8.0 km) east of WIS 49. WIS 21 crosses WIS 116 in Omro. The highway then enters the greater Oshkosh area and junctions with US 41 along Omro Road. WIS 21 continues along Omro Road, Oshkosh Avenue and Congress Avenue, ending at US 45 (Algoma Boulevard) on the northwest side of Oshkosh after crossing the upper Fox River east of Lake Butte des Morts.

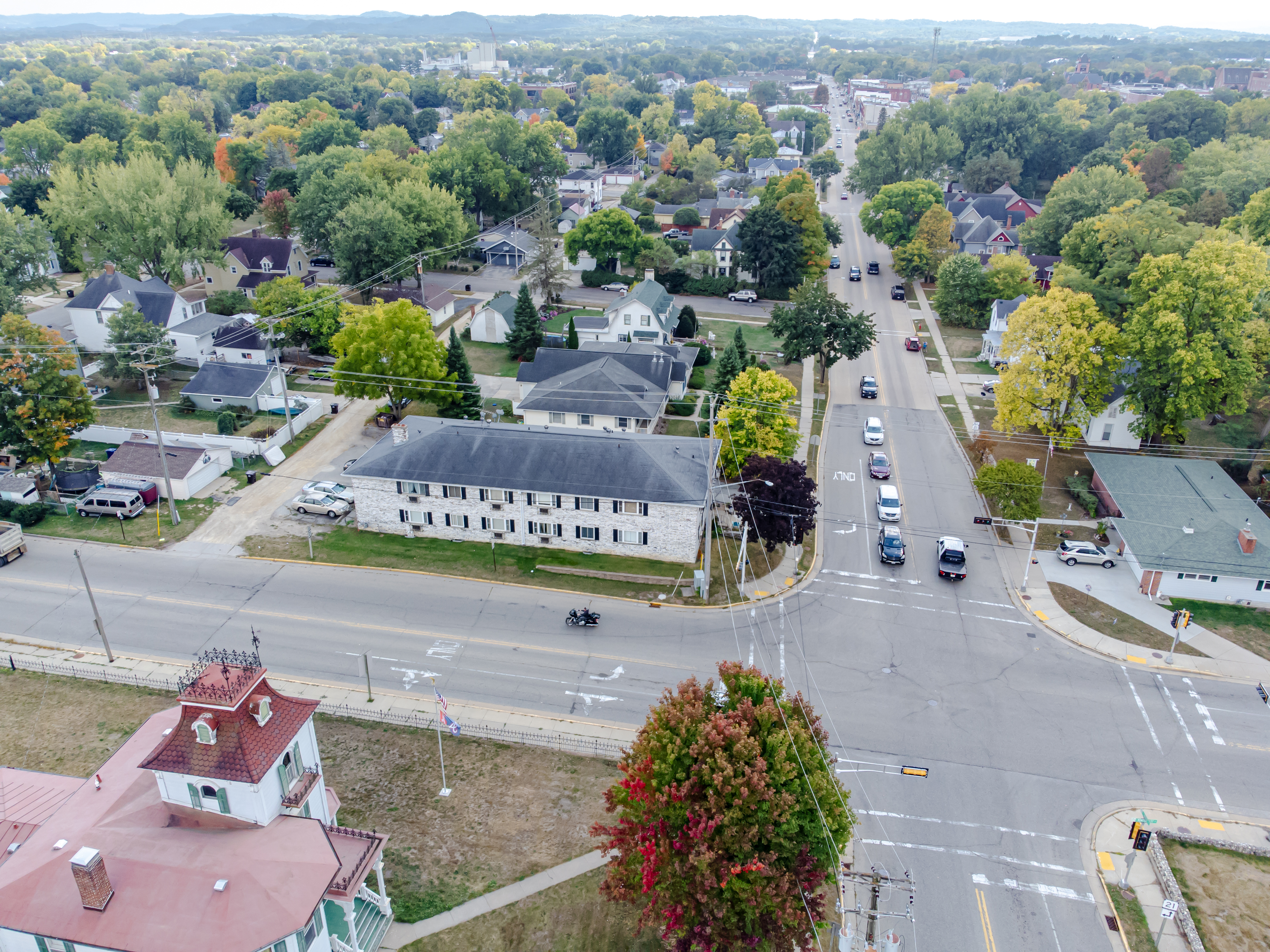
WIS 21 turns through downtown Sparta

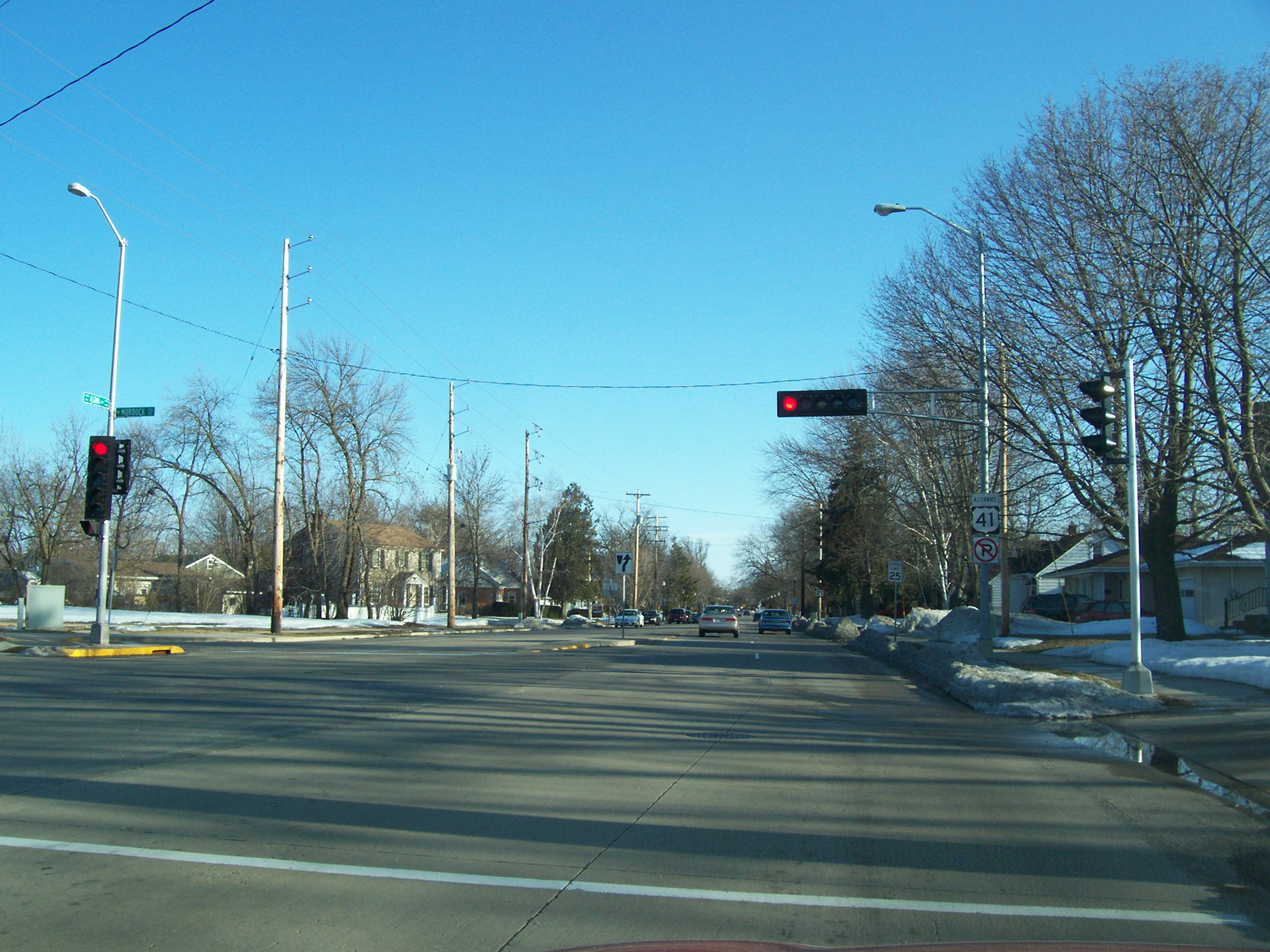
Eastern terminus at US 45

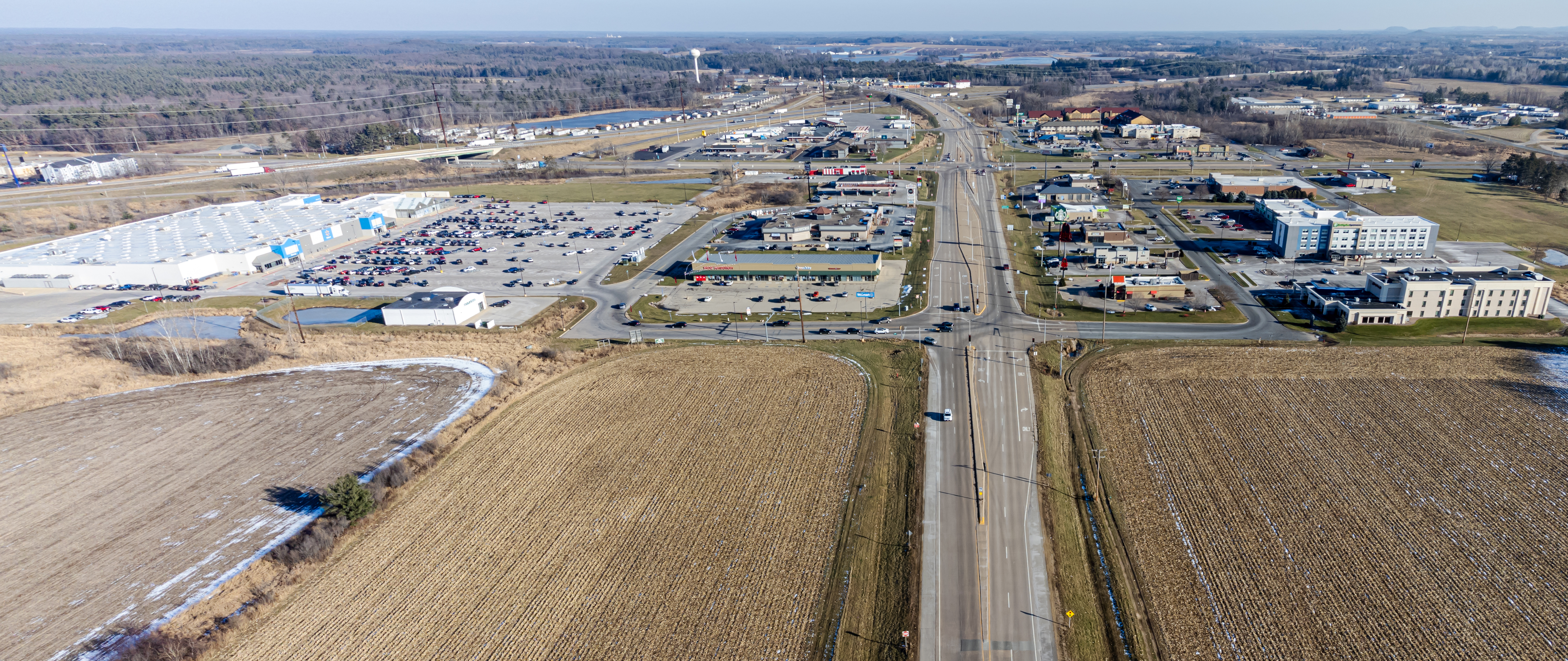
WIS 21 in Tomah with I-94 and US 12 junction in the background

== History ==
The route was first written into law in from La Crosse to Oshkosh. The highway passed through Sparta, but through the south side of Tomah and New Lisbon before turning north to Necedah. After crossing the Wisconsin River, WIS 21 followed WIS 13 into Adams and Friendship. Both highways followed a different right-of-way at the time. WIS 21 then returned to the present corridor route to pass through Coloma, Wautoma, Omro and into Oshkosh. The route from La Crosse to New Lisbon was removed in the early 1920s and extended along its current alignment through Wyeville to North Tomah. The highway was rerouted in Adams County to become more direct between Arkdale and CTH-G in 1939. The western extension past Fort McCoy into Sparta was added in 1947.

== Major intersections ==
| County | Location | mi | km | Destinations | Notes |
|---|---|---|---|---|---|
| Monroe | Sparta | | | WIS 16 west – West Salem WIS 27 / WIS 71 west – Black River Falls, Cashton | Western end of WIS 16/WIS 27 concurrency |
| Monroe | Sparta | | | WIS 16 east / WIS 71 east – Tomah, Norwalk | Eastern end of WIS 16/WIS27 concurrency |
| Monroe | Angelo | | | CTH-I / CTH-Q | |
| Monroe | Tunnel City | | | CTH-M | |
| Monroe | Tomah | | | I-94 / US 12 – Black River Falls, Eau Claire, Madison | |
| Monroe | Wyeville | | | WIS 173 north / CTH-N – Mather, Babcock | |
| Monroe | Wyeville | | | CTH-PP | |
| Juneau | Cutler | | | CTH-M | |
| Juneau | Necedah | | | WIS 80 – Marshfield, New Lisbon | |
| Juneau | Necedah | | | CTH-G | |
| Adams | Arkdale | | | CTH-Z | |
| Adams | Cottonville | | | WIS 13 – Wisconsin Rapids, Wisconsin Dells | |
| Adams | | | | CTH-G | |
| Waushara | Coloma | | | I-39 / US 51 – Stevens Point, Portage | |
| Waushara | Richford | | | CTH-B | |
| Waushara | | | | CTH-Y | |
| Waushara | Wautoma | | | WIS 22 south – Montello | Southern end of WIS 22 concurrency |
| Waushara | Wautoma | | | WIS 22 north / WIS 73 north – Wisconsin Rapids, Wild Rose, Waupaca | Western end of WIS 73 concurrency |
| Waushara | Wautoma | | | WIS 152 east – Mount Morris | |
| Waushara | Wautoma | | | WIS 73 south – Princeton | Eastern end of WIS 73 concurrency |
| Waushara | Lohrville | | | CTH-S | |
| Waushara | Redgranite | | | CTH-E | |
| Waushara | Auroraville | | | WIS 49 – Waupaca, Berlin | |
| Winnebago | Rushford | | | CTH-K | |
| Winnebago | Omro | | | WIS 116 – Winneconne, Waukau, Berlin | |
| Winnebago | Oshkosh | | | I-41 / US 41 – Green Bay, Milwaukee | |
| Winnebago | Oshkosh | | | US 45 (Algoma Boulevarad, Murdock Avenue) | |
1.000 mi = 1.609 km; 1.000 km = 0.621 mi: Concurrency terminus
