= Greenfield, Monroe County, Wisconsin =

Greenfield, Wisconsin
- Town
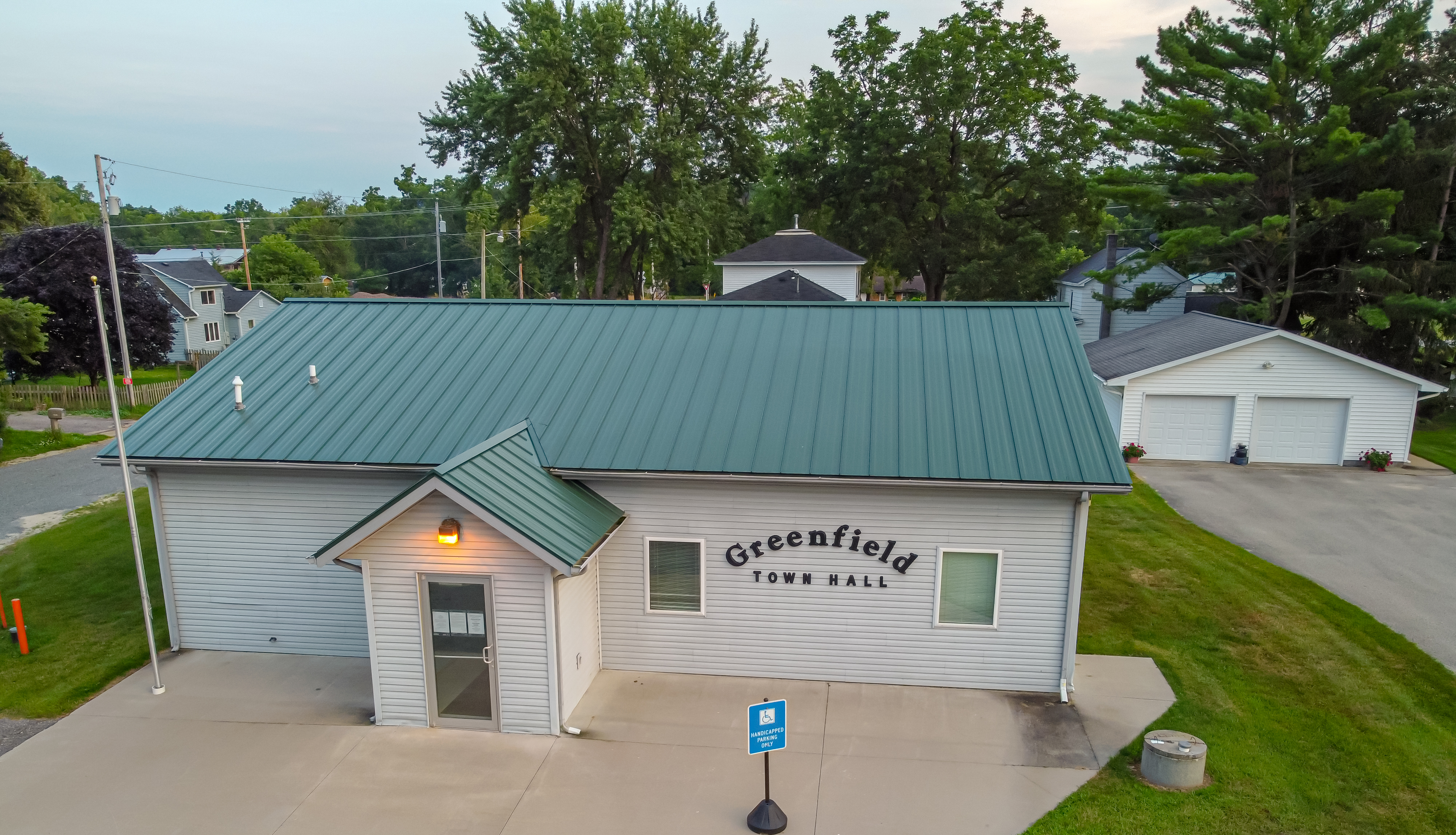
- Greenfield Town Hall in Tunnel City

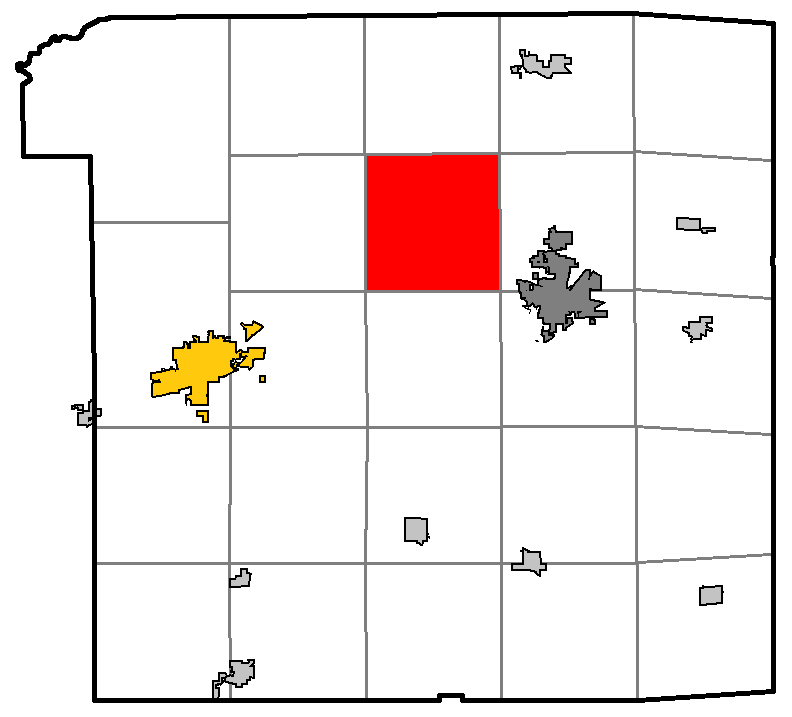
- Location of Greenfield, Monroe County, Wisconsin

- Location of Monroe County, Wisconsin
- Coordinates: 44°0′39″N 90°35′28″W
- Country: United States
- State: Wisconsin
- County: Monroe

Area
  - Total: 35.3 sq mi (91.5 km^{2})
  - Land: 35.3 sq mi (91.4 km^{2})
  - Water: 0.039 sq mi (0.1 km^{2})
- Elevation: 968 ft (295 m)

Population (2020)
  - Total: 677
  - Density: 19.2/sq mi (7.41/km^{2})
- Time zone: UTC-6 (Central (CST))
  - Summer (DST): UTC-5 (CDT)
- Area code: 608
- FIPS code: 55-31225
- GNIS feature ID: 1583315

Greenfield is a town in Monroe County, Wisconsin, United States. The population was 677 at the 2020 census. The unincorporated communities of Raymore, Spring Bank Park, and Tunnel City are located within the town.

== Geography ==
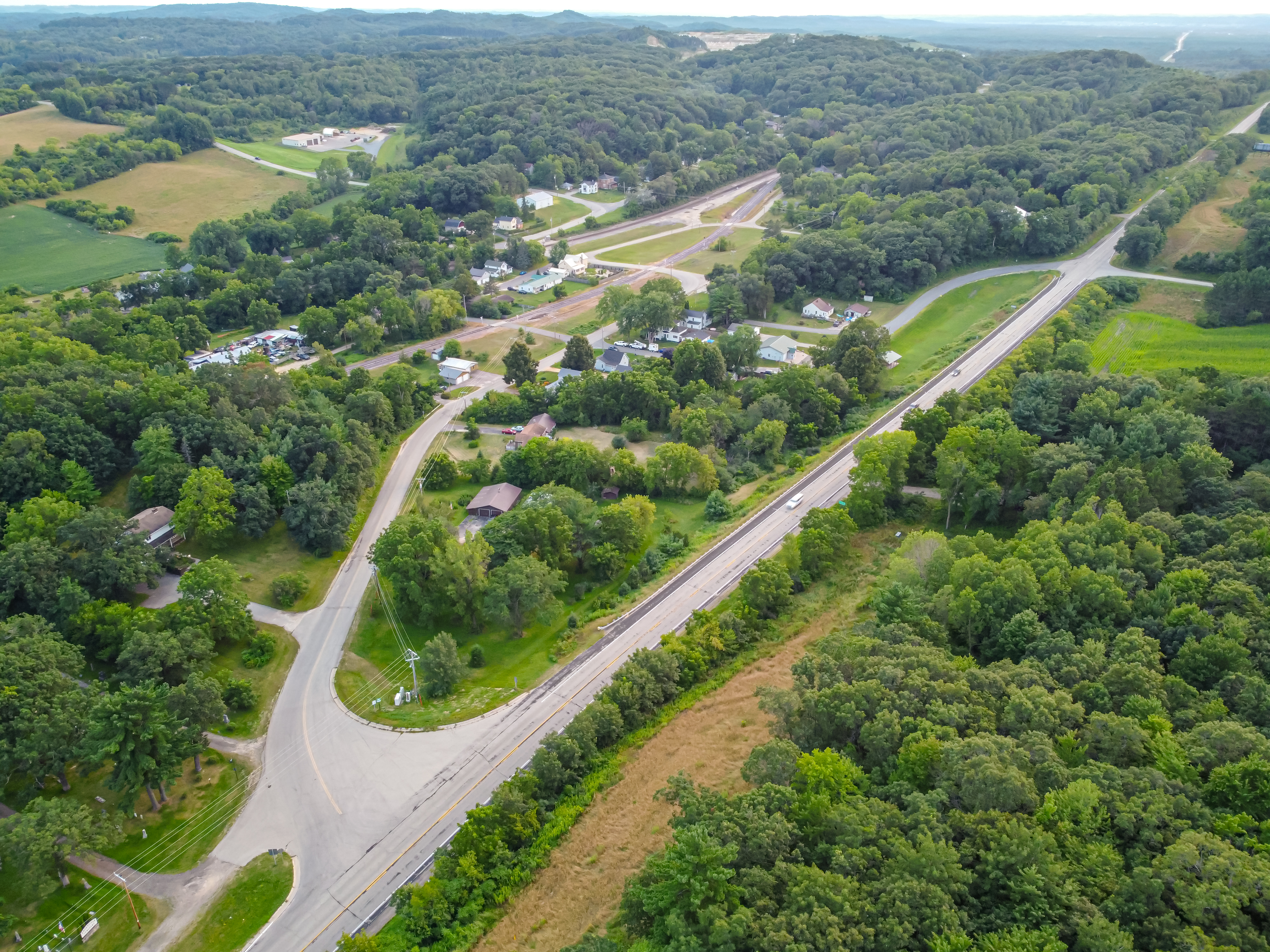
Tunnel City on Wis-21

According to the United States Census Bureau, the town has a total area of 35.3 square miles (91.5 km^{2}), of which 35.3 square miles (91.4 km^{2}) is land and 0.1 square mile (0.2 km^{2}) (0.17%) is water.

== Demographics ==
As of the census of 2000, there were 626 people, 236 households, and 192 families residing in the town. The population density was 17.7 people per square mile (6.8/km^{2}). There were 269 housing units at an average density of 7.6 per square mile (2.9/km^{2}). The racial makeup of the town was 97.92% White, 0.48% African American, 1.12% Native American, 0.16% Asian, 0.16% from other races, and 0.16% from two or more races. Hispanic or Latino of any race were 0.48% of the population.

There were 236 households, out of which 34.7% had children under the age of 18 living with them, 75.8% were married couples living together, 3.0% had a female householder with no husband present, and 18.6% were non-families. 16.9% of all households were made up of individuals, and 8.5% had someone living alone who was 65 years of age or older. The average household size was 2.64 and the average family size was 2.99.

In the town, the population was spread out, with 27.0% under the age of 18, 4.2% from 18 to 24, 25.7% from 25 to 44, 30.2% from 45 to 64, and 12.9% who were 65 years of age or older. The median age was 41 years. For every 100 females, there were 103.2 males. For every 100 females age 18 and over, there were 102.2 males.

The median income for a household in the town was $47,750, and the median income for a family was $55,417. Males had a median income of $30,500 versus $26,771 for females. The per capita income for the town was $22,380. About 3.8% of families and 3.8% of the population were below the poverty line, including 1.2% of those under age 18 and 11.8% of those age 65 or over.
