= Lohrville =

Lohrville may refer to a place in the United States:

- Lohrville, Iowa
- Lohrville, Wisconsin
