= Borth, Wisconsin =

Borth
- unincorporated community
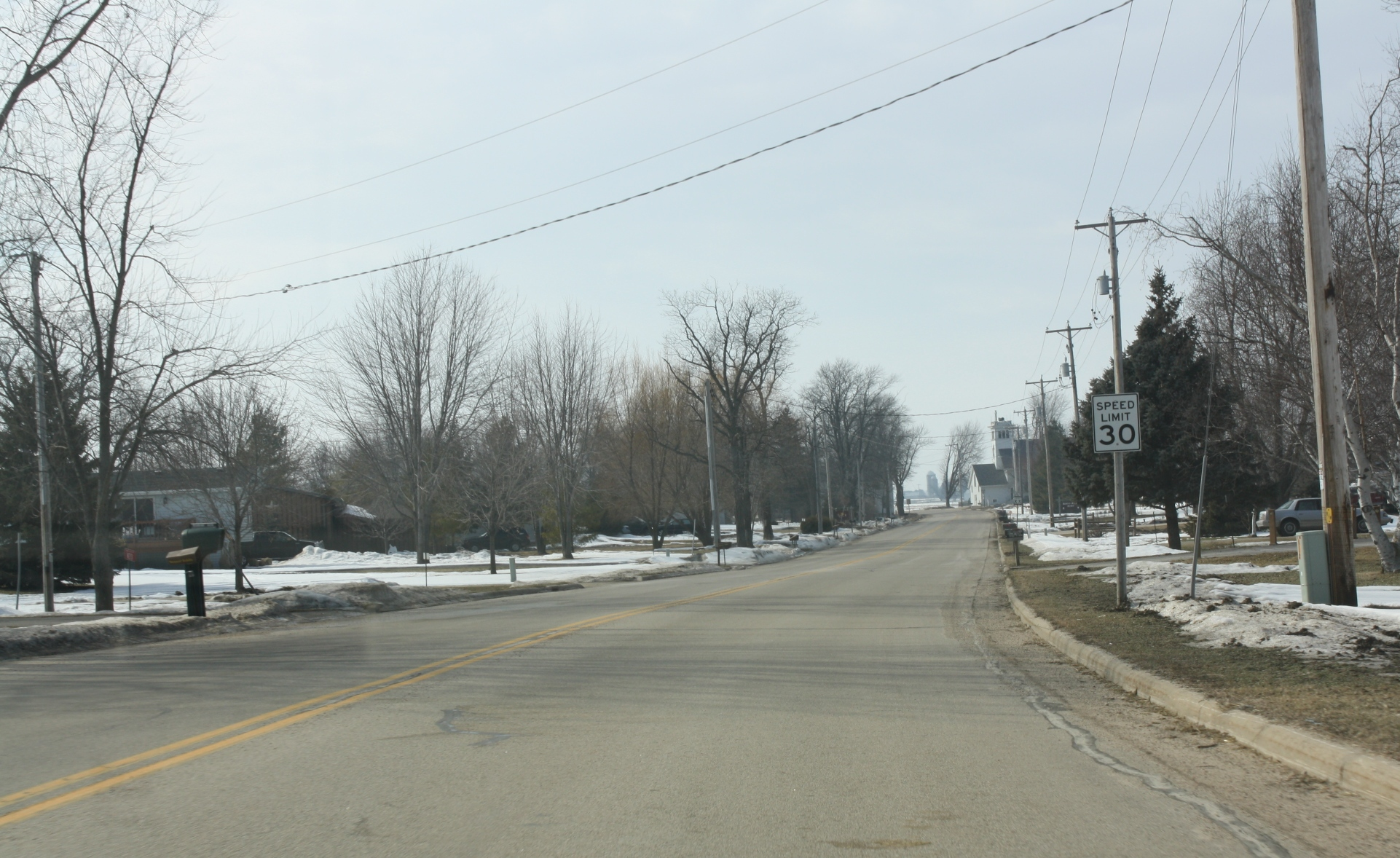
- Looking west at Borth

- Location within the state of Wisconsin Borth (the United States)
- Country: United States
- State: Wisconsin
- County: Waushara
- Elevation: 761 ft (232 m)
- Time zone: UTC-6 (Central (CST))
  - Summer (DST): UTC-5 (CDT)
- Area code: 920
- GNIS feature ID: 1577521

Borth is an unincorporated community in Waushara County, Wisconsin, United States. The community is located at the intersection of County D and County XX, near the town of Poy Sippi. Lake Poygan and marsh lie to the north along Willow Creek. The community was named in April 1892 by and for August Borth, the first postmaster and owner of a local cheese factory.

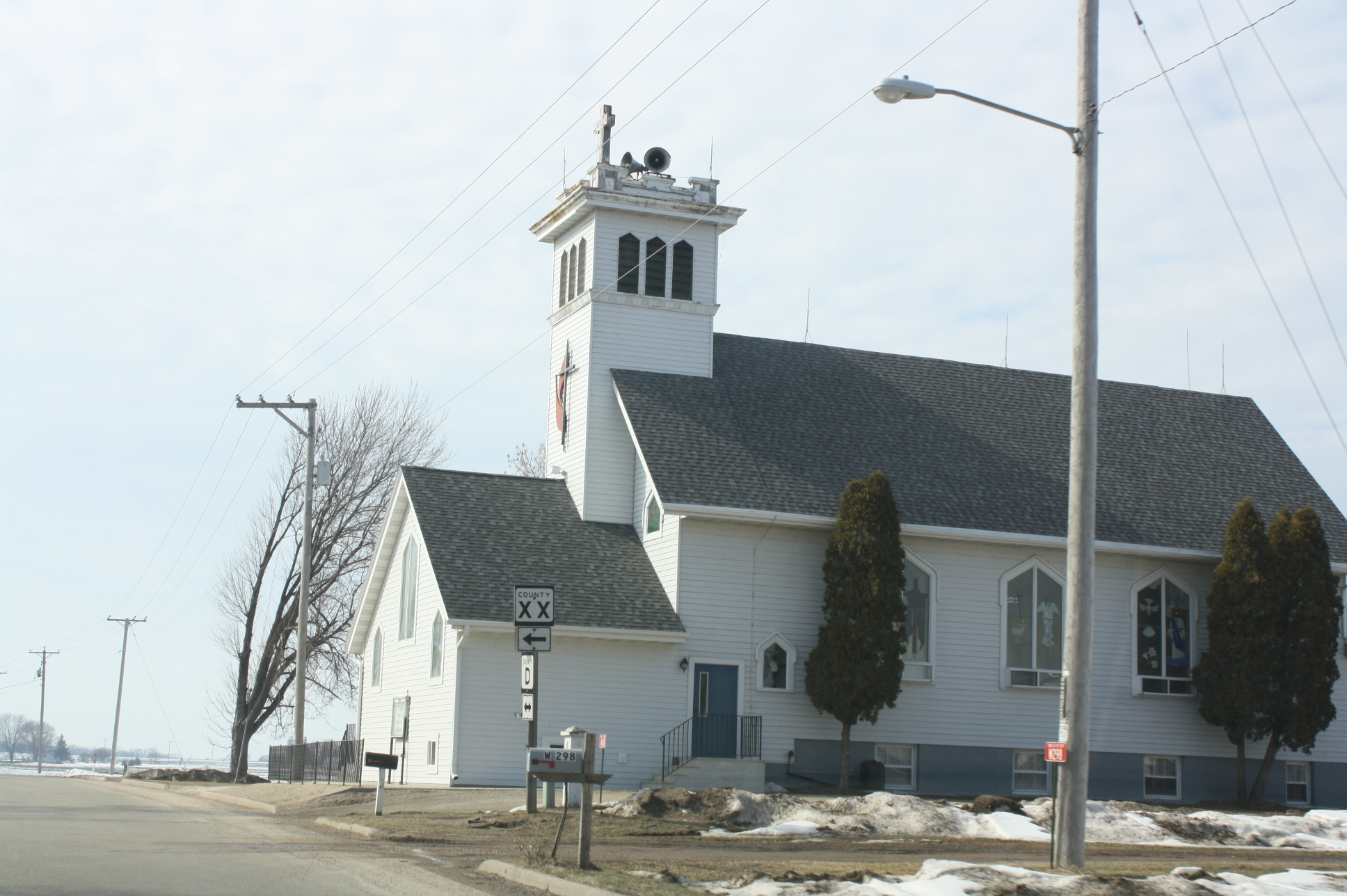
Methodist church

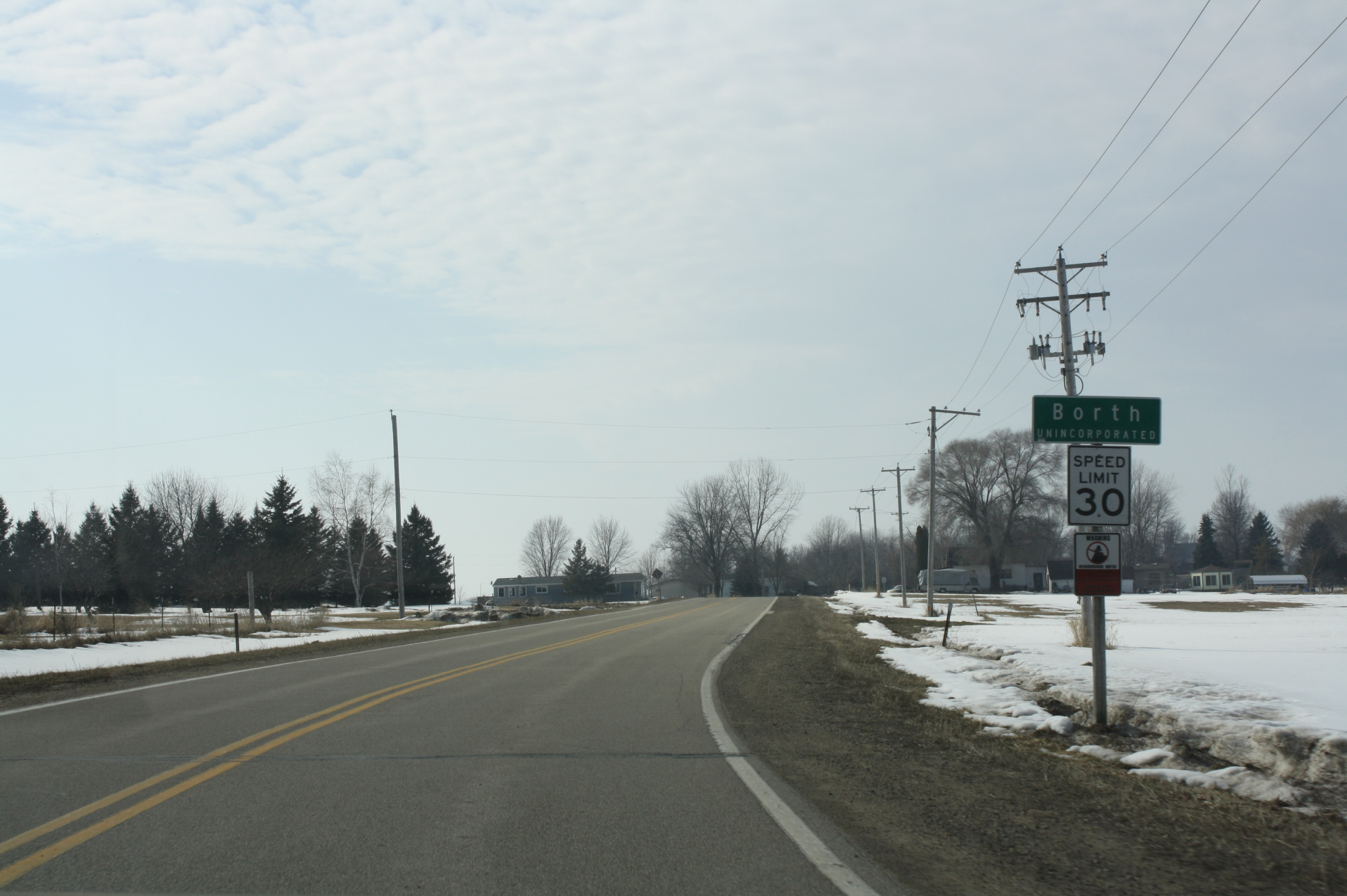
Sign
