= Poy Sippi (CDP), Wisconsin =

Census-designated place in Wisconsin, United States

Poy Sippi
- Census-designated place
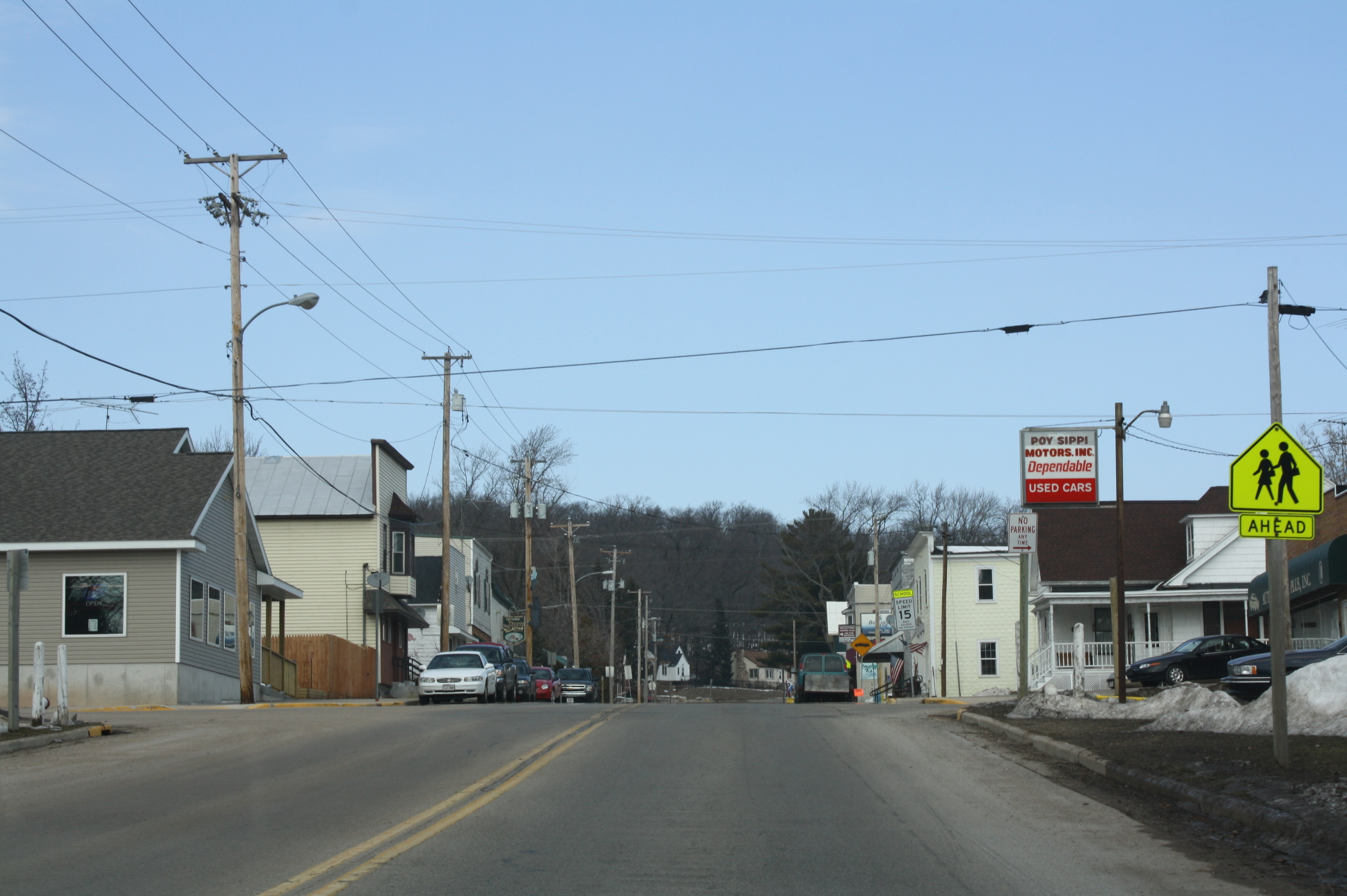
- Looking north at downtown Poy Sippi
- Interactive map of Poy Sippi
- Coordinates: 44°08′14″N 88°59′43″W
- Country: United States
- State: Wisconsin
- County: Waushara

Area
  - Total: 0.757 sq mi (1.96 km^{2})
  - Land: 0.728 sq mi (1.89 km^{2})
  - Water: 0.029 sq mi (0.075 km^{2})

Population (2020)
  - Total: 379
  - Density: 521/sq mi (201/km^{2})
- Time zone: UTC-6 (Central (CST))
  - Summer (DST): UTC-5 (CDT)
- ZIP codes: 54967
- Area code: 920

Poy Sippi is an unincorporated census-designated place in the town of Poy Sippi in Waushara County, Wisconsin, United States. It is located at the intersection of Wisconsin Highway 49 and County H. As of the 2010 census, its population is 371.

== History ==
The Pine River was called "Poygan Sippi" by Potawatomi Indians because it flowed into Lake Poygan. The name was contracted to Poy Sippi. It is said to be a corruption of an Indian word meaning "Sioux river." In the related Menominee language, it is called Pawāhnān-Sīpiah, "Wild Rice Gathering River", referring to the importance of wild rice as a staple crop to the local people.

== Images ==
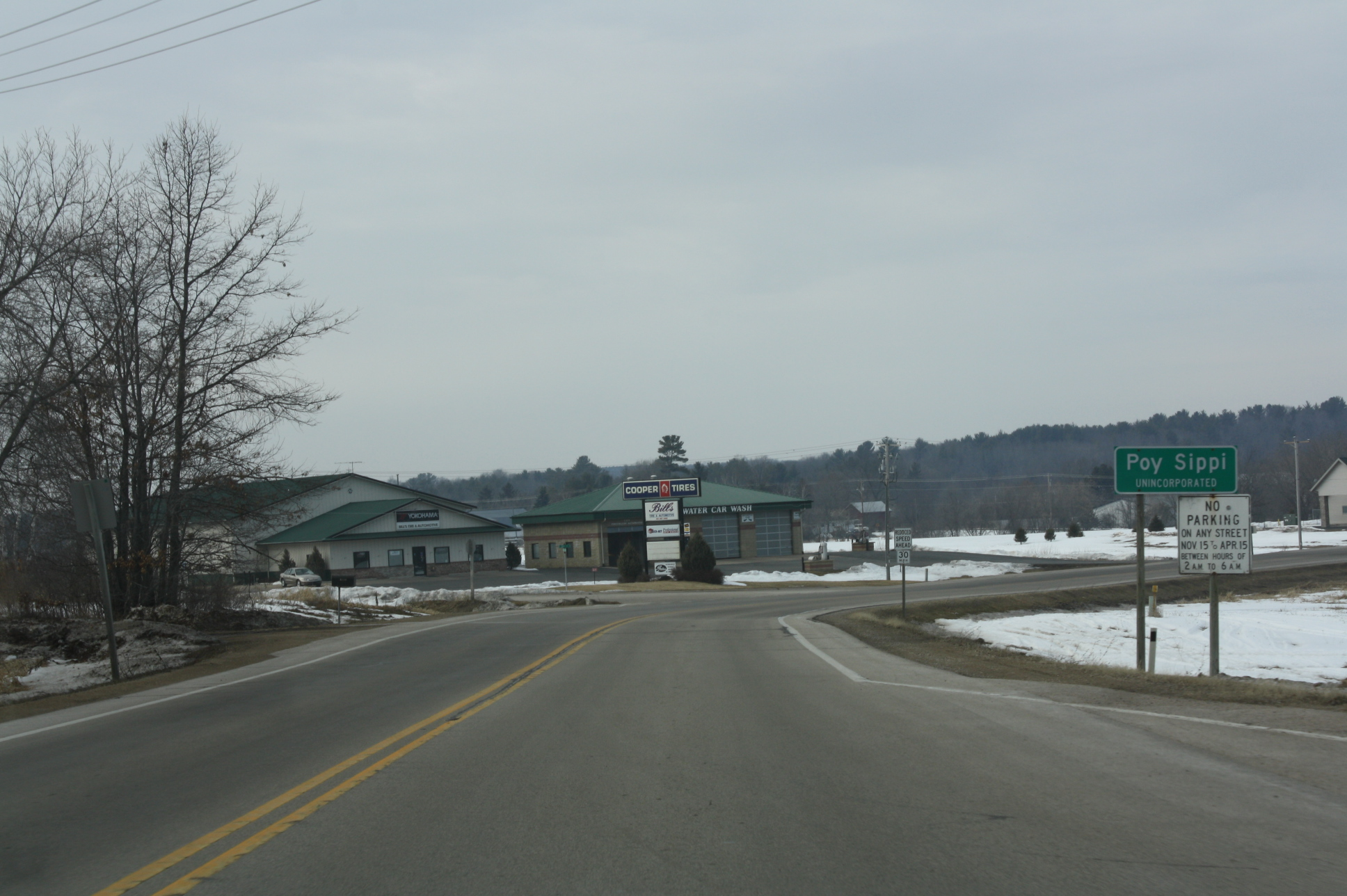
The sign for Poy Sippi

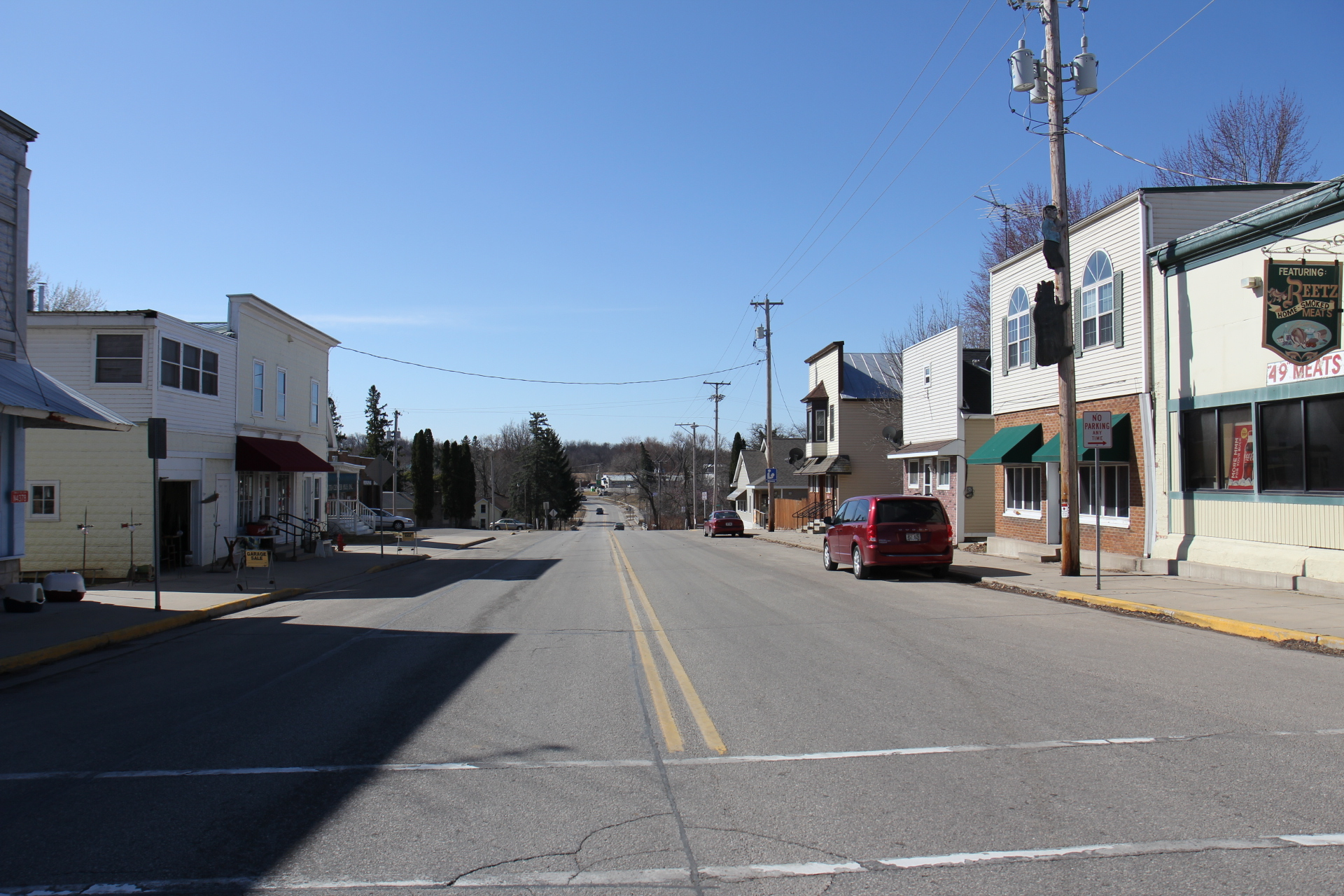
Looking south on WIS 49
