= Poy Sippi, Wisconsin =

- Town
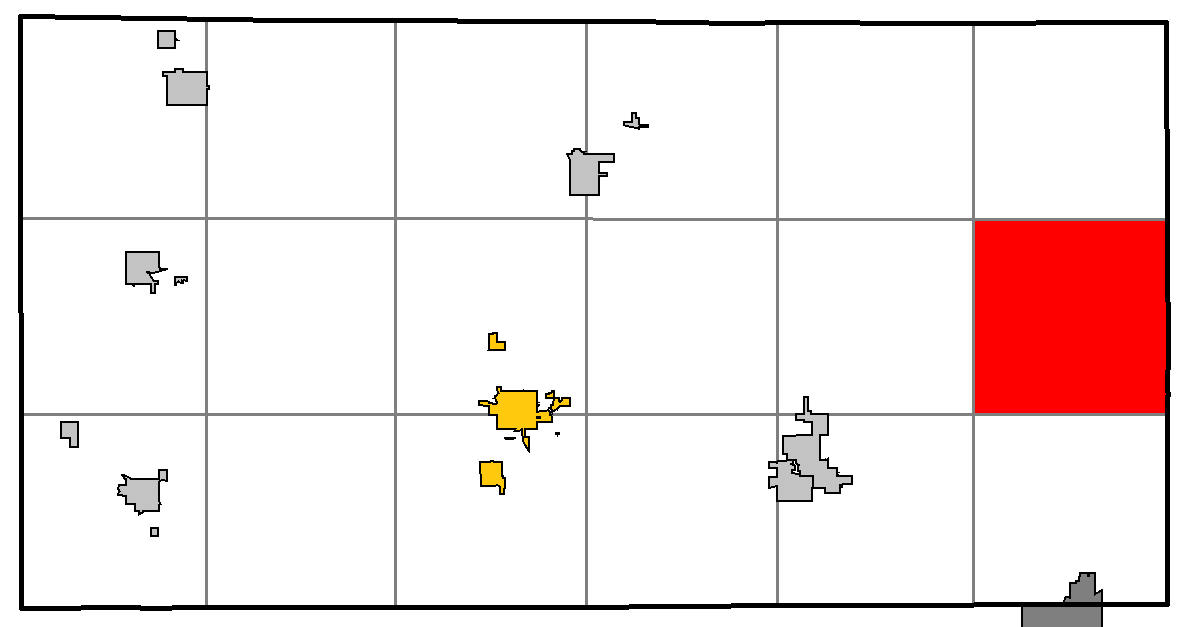
- Location of Poy Sippi, Wisconsin

- Location of Waushara County, Wisconsin
- Coordinates: 44°6′45″N 88°56′47″W
- Country: United States
- State: Wisconsin
- County: Waushara

Area
  - Total: 35.9 sq mi (93.1 km^{2})
  - Land: 32.3 sq mi (83.7 km^{2})
  - Water: 3.6 sq mi (9.4 km^{2})
- Elevation: 751 ft (229 m)

Population (2020)
  - Total: 919
  - Density: 28.4/sq mi (11.0/km^{2})
- Time zone: UTC-6 (Central (CST))
  - Summer (DST): UTC-5 (CDT)
- ZIP Code: 54967
- Area code: 920
- FIPS code: 55-64975
- GNIS feature ID: 1583970

Poy Sippi is a town in Waushara County, Wisconsin, United States. The population was 919 at the 2020 census. The census-designated place of Poy Sippi is located in the town. The unincorporated communities of Borth and Fountain Valley are also located in the town.

== History ==
The Pine River was called "Poygan Sippi" by Potawatomi Indians because it flowed into Lake Poygan. The name was contracted to Poy Sippi. It is said to be a corruption of an Indian word meaning "Sioux river." In the related Menominee language, it is called Pawāhnān-Sīpiah, "Wild Rice Gathering River", referring to the importance of wild rice as a staple crop to the local people.

== Geography ==
According to the United States Census Bureau, the town has a total area of 35.9 square miles (93.1 km^{2}), of which 32.3 square miles (83.7 km^{2}) is land and 3.6 square miles (9.4 km^{2}) (10.10%) is water.

== Demographics ==
As of the census of 2000, there were 972 people, 392 households, and 286 families residing in the town. The population density was 30.1 people per square mile (11.6/km^{2}). There were 436 housing units at an average density of 13.5 per square mile (5.2/km^{2}). The racial makeup of the town was 97.12% White, 0.21% African American, 0.21% Native American, 0.10% Asian, 1.34% from other races, and 1.03% from two or more races. Hispanic or Latino of any race were 2.06% of the population.

There were 392 households, out of which 32.7% had children under the age of 18 living with them, 61.0% were married couples living together, 7.9% had a female householder with no husband present, and 26.8% were non-families. 23.2% of all households were made up of individuals, and 11.0% had someone living alone who was 65 years of age or older. The average household size was 2.48 and the average family size was 2.91.

In the town, the population was spread out, with 24.7% under the age of 18, 6.5% from 18 to 24, 29.7% from 25 to 44, 23.4% from 45 to 64, and 15.7% who were 65 years of age or older. The median age was 39 years. For every 100 females, there were 96.8 males. For every 100 females age 18 and over, there were 97.8 males.

The median income for a household in the town was $40,489, and the median income for a family was $47,250. Males had a median income of $34,167 versus $21,607 for females. The per capita income for the town was $18,625. About 3.6% of families and 7.0% of the population were below the poverty line, including 3.3% of those under age 18 and 10.2% of those age 65 or over.
