= Tunnel City, Wisconsin =

Census-designated place in Wisconsin, United States

- Census-designated place
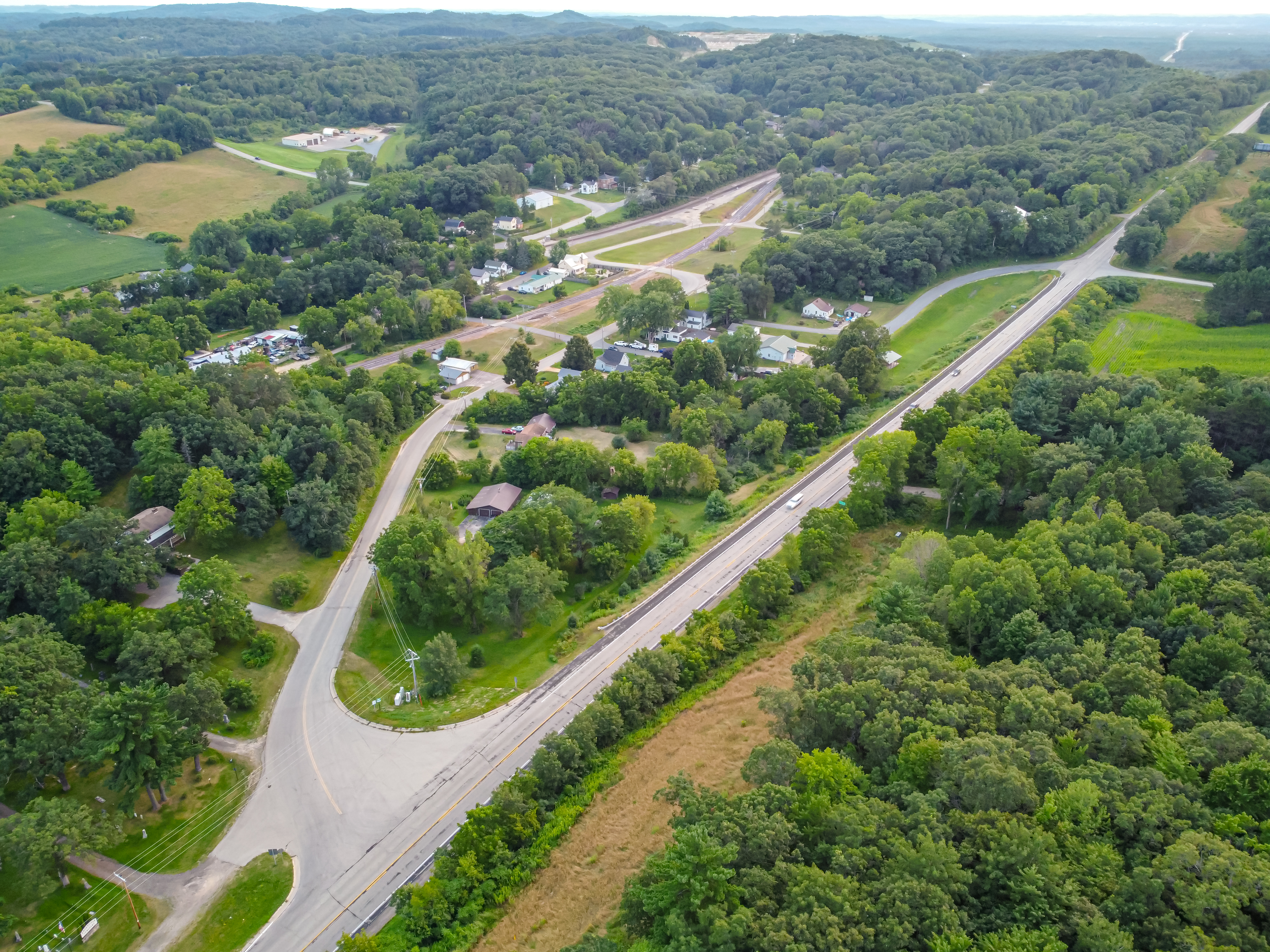
- Wis-21 runs by town

- Location within Wisconsin
- Coordinates: 44°00′26″N 90°33′56″W
- Country: United States
- State: Wisconsin
- County: Monroe

Area
  - Total: 0.310 sq mi (0.80 km^{2})
  - Land: 0.310 sq mi (0.80 km^{2})
  - Water: 0 sq mi (0 km^{2})
- Elevation: 1,060 ft (320 m)

Population (2020)
  - Total: 100
  - Density: 320/sq mi (120/km^{2})
- Time zone: UTC-6 (Central (CST))
  - Summer (DST): UTC-5 (CDT)
- ZIP code: 54662
- Area code: 608
- GNIS feature ID: 1575713

Tunnel City is an unincorporated census-designated place in the town of Greenfield, Monroe County, Wisconsin, United States, named after the train tunnel through a hill just to the west of town. The population was 100 at the 2020 census.

== Milwaukee Road tunnels ==
This first tunnel was built by the La Crosse and Milwaukee railroad, and used by the Chicago, Milwaukee, St. Paul & Pacific Railroad (Milwaukee Road). The first tunnel was completed in 1858 as the last segment of the rail route from Milwaukee to La Crosse. The station was simply named "Tunnel". This tunnel was updated in 1861. It was replaced by another tunnel directly to its north in 1874. That tunnel, and the railroad itself, is now owned by the Canadian Pacific Railway, whose Soo Line subsidiary purchased the rail assets of the Milwaukee Road in February 1985. The CP also hosts Amtrak’s Empire Builder and Borealis (train) passenger trains, though rail traffic is dominated by freight as the Tomah Subdivision. Neither the Empire Builder nor the Borealis stop in Tunnel City. The Soo Line had raised the bore of the tunnel 14 inches (36 cm) completed in 1993 to accommodate double stack traffic. The Soo Line considered excavating the hill or "daylighting" the tunnel bore.

== Chicago and North Western tunnel ==
The Milwaukee, Sparta, and Northwestern Railroad Company, a subsidiary of the Chicago and North Western Transportation Company, built the "Air Line" or "Adams Cutoff" towards Sparta, Wisconsin in 1910. This is when the third tunnel through the hill west of the town was constructed. It is just to the north of the Milwaukee Road tunnels, and parallel. This 1910 tunnel collapsed in March 1973. An extra heavy snow added to already saturated ground. The Chicago and North Western rerouted to the older Milwaukee tunnel. The CNW route, to Onalaska and Winona, is now mostly abandoned between Tunnel City and Medary. The Union Pacific Railroad, which purchased the CNW, has trackage rights from Tunnel City to Winona (Tower CK) on the parallel Canadian Pacific track. These rights date from the CNW tunnel collapse in 1973.

== Census information ==
As of the 2010 census, its population is 106. Tunnel City has an area of 0.310 square miles (0.80 km^{2}), all land.

== Gallery ==
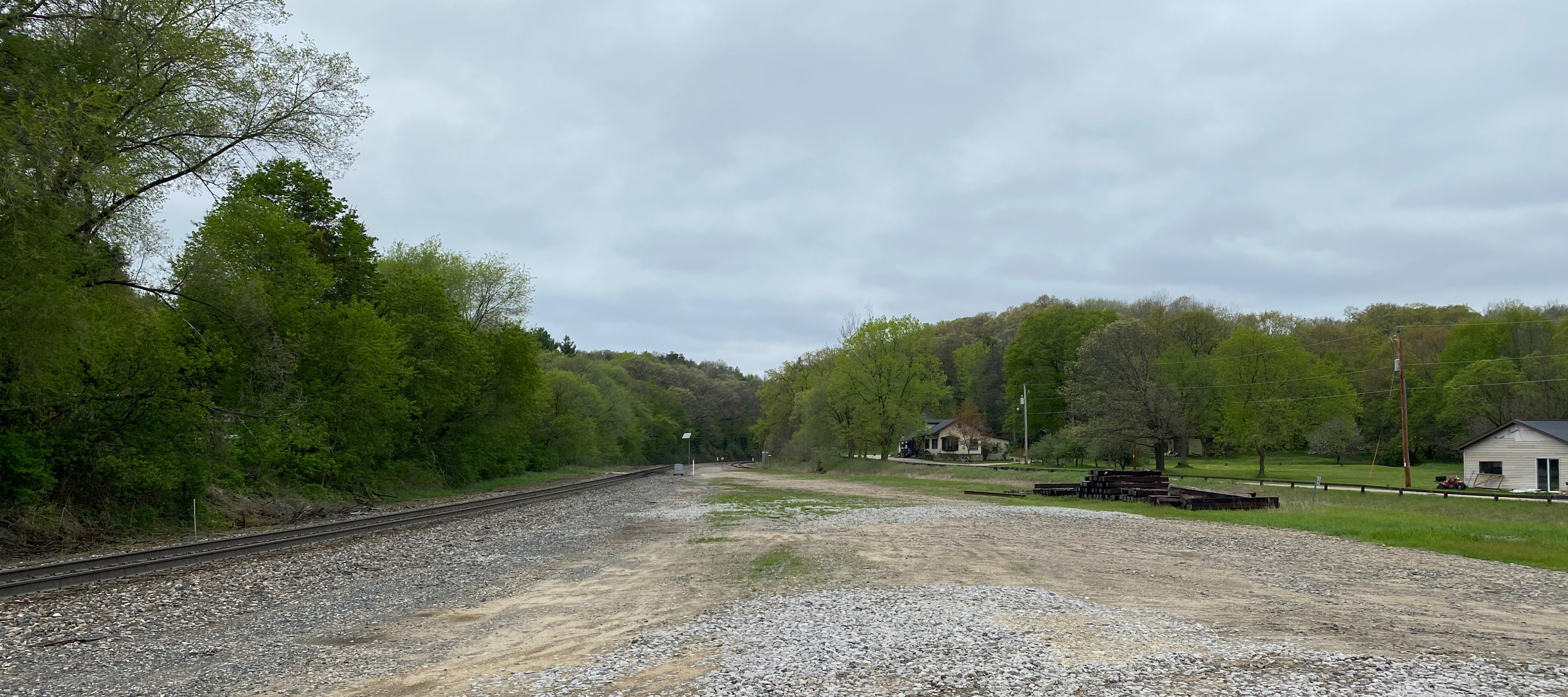

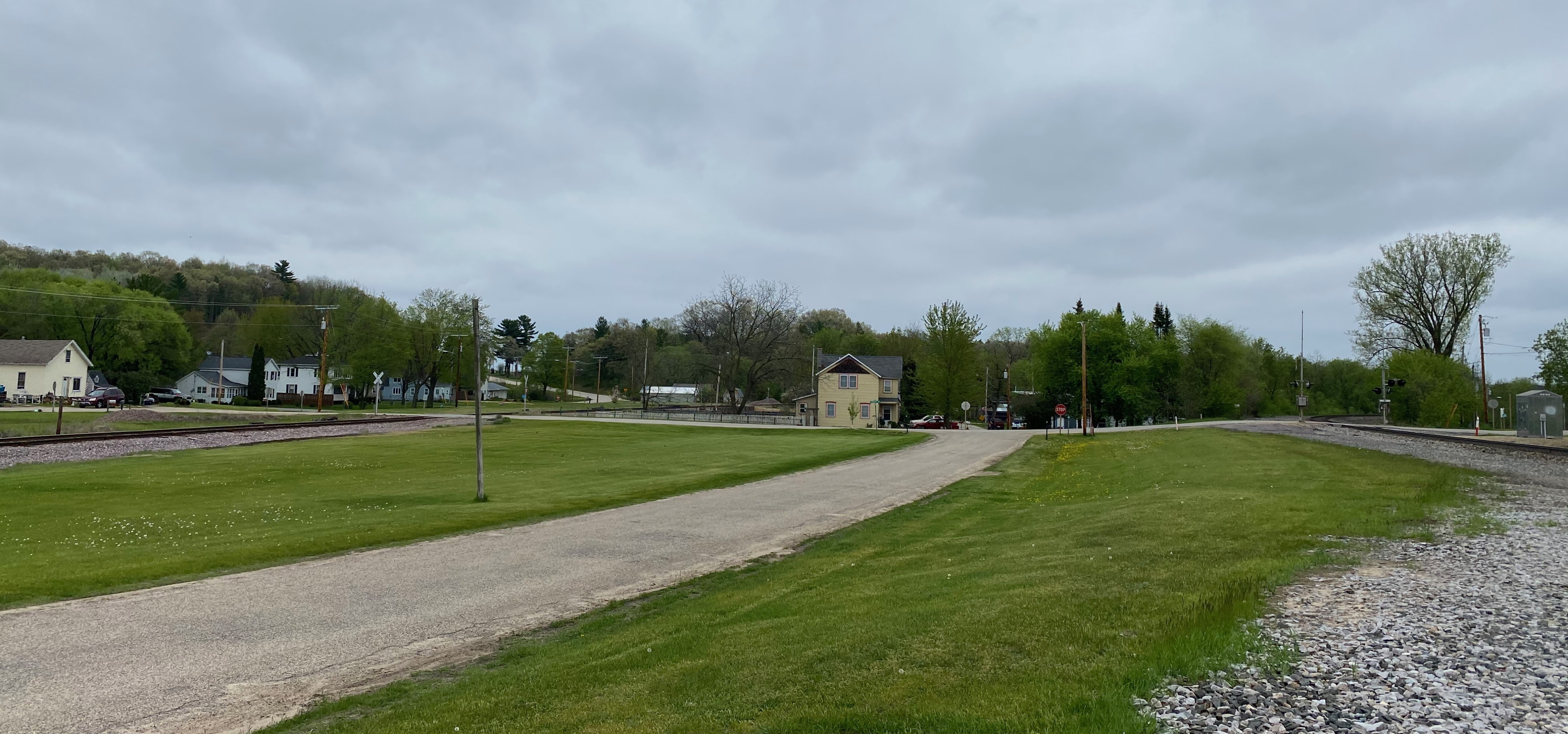
