= Dakota, Wisconsin =

- Town
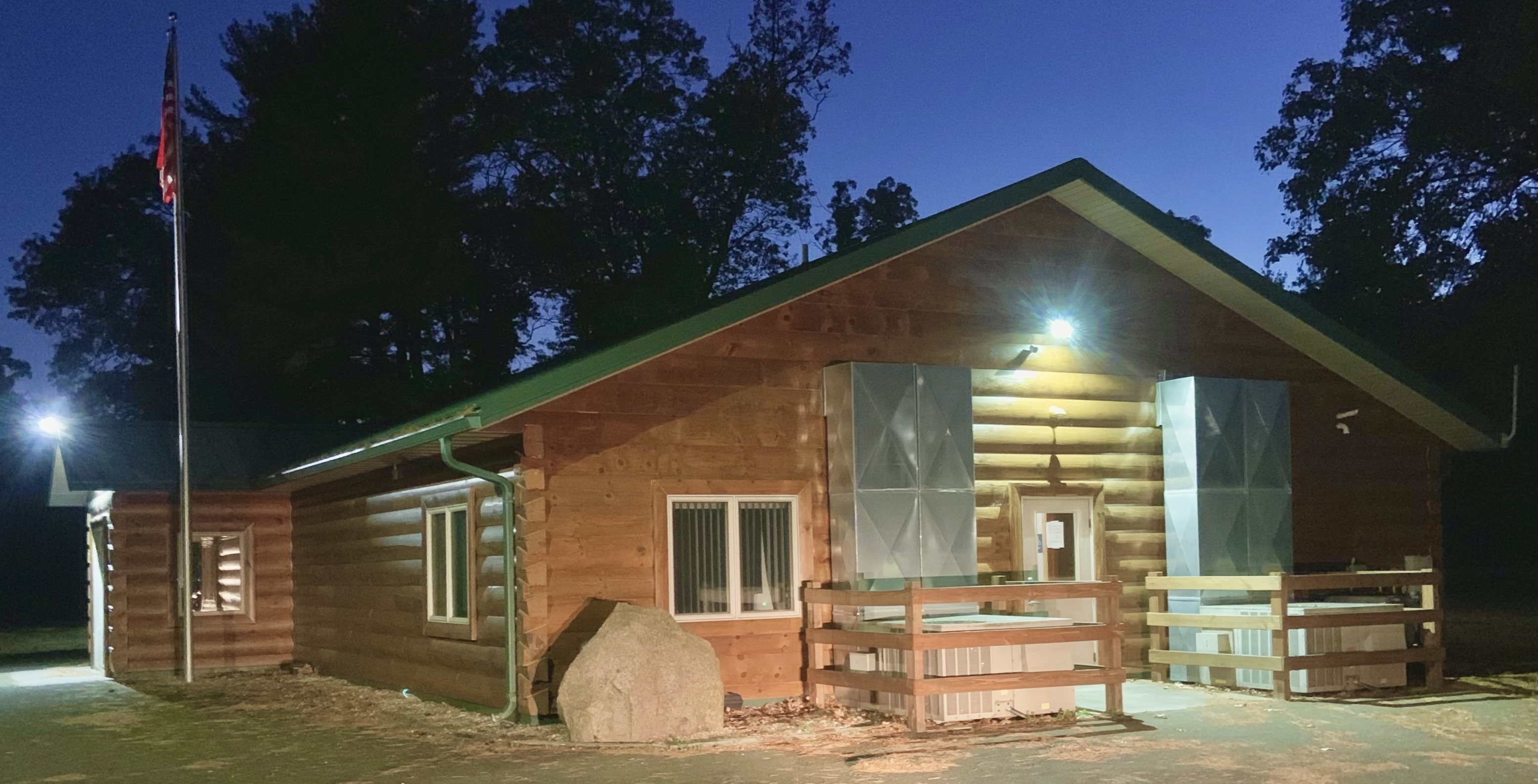
- Town hall

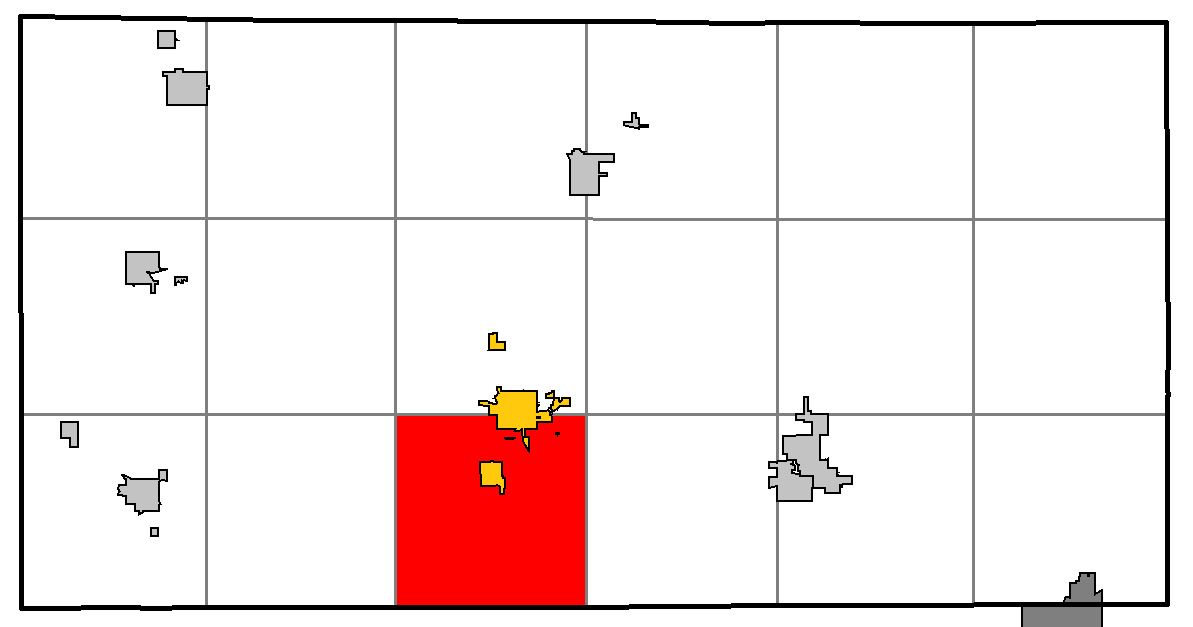
- Location of Dakota, Wisconsin

- Location of Waushara County, Wisconsin
- Coordinates: 44°1′54″N 89°17′59″W
- Country: United States
- State: Wisconsin
- County: Waushara

Area
  - Total: 33.7 sq mi (87.4 km^{2})
  - Land: 33.2 sq mi (85.9 km^{2})
  - Water: 0.58 sq mi (1.5 km^{2})
- Elevation: 850 ft (259 m)

Population (2020)
  - Total: 1,143
  - Density: 34.5/sq mi (13.3/km^{2})
- Time zone: UTC-6 (Central (CST))
  - Summer (DST): UTC-5 (CDT)
- FIPS code: 55-18475
- GNIS feature ID: 1583043
- Website: http://townofdakota.org

Dakota is a town, as well as an unincorporated community in Waushara County, Wisconsin, United States. The population was 1,143 at the 2020 census. The town took its name from the community of the same name, which was platted for the community's first postmaster, Chapin M. Seeley, in 1853. It was likely named for the Dakota Territory, which was in the news at the time. The unincorporated community of Bannerman is also located in the town. Bannerman was originally named Bannerman Junction in 1901 as a stop on the Chicago & Northwestern Railroad. It was named for William and John Bannerman, two Scottish men who owned the area's granite company.

== Geography ==
According to the United States Census Bureau, the town has a total area of 33.8 square miles (87.4 km^{2}), of which 33.2 square miles (85.9 km^{2}) is land and 0.6 square mile (1.5 km^{2}) (1.75%) is water.

== Demographics ==
As of the census of 2000, there were 1,259 people, 493 households, and 356 families residing in the town. The population density was 38.0 inhabitants per square mile (14.7/km^{2}). There were 693 housing units at an average density of 20.9 per square mile (8.1/km^{2}). The racial makeup of the town was 93.33% White, 0.16% Native American, 0.40% Asian, 0.08% Pacific Islander, 5.40% from other races, and 0.64% from two or more races. Hispanic or Latino of any race were 8.66% of the population.

There were 493 households, out of which 31.8% had children under the age of 18 living with them, 64.3% were married couples living together, 4.9% had a female householder with no husband present, and 27.6% were non-families. 22.5% of all households were made up of individuals, and 10.3% had someone living alone who was 65 years of age or older. The average household size was 2.55 and the average family size was 2.97.

In the town, the population was spread out, with 26.6% under the age of 18, 6.4% from 18 to 24, 25.4% from 25 to 44, 24.9% from 45 to 64, and 16.6% who were 65 years of age or older. The median age was 40 years. For every 100 females, there were 107.4 males. For every 100 females age 18 and over, there were 100.9 males.

The median income for a household in the town was $34,931, and the median income for a family was $37,000. Males had a median income of $30,208 versus $19,438 for females. The per capita income for the town was $18,401. About 7.6% of families and 12.4% of the population were below the poverty line, including 22.3% of those under age 18 and 3.6% of those age 65 or over.
