= Waushara County, Wisconsin =

County in Wisconsin, United States

- County
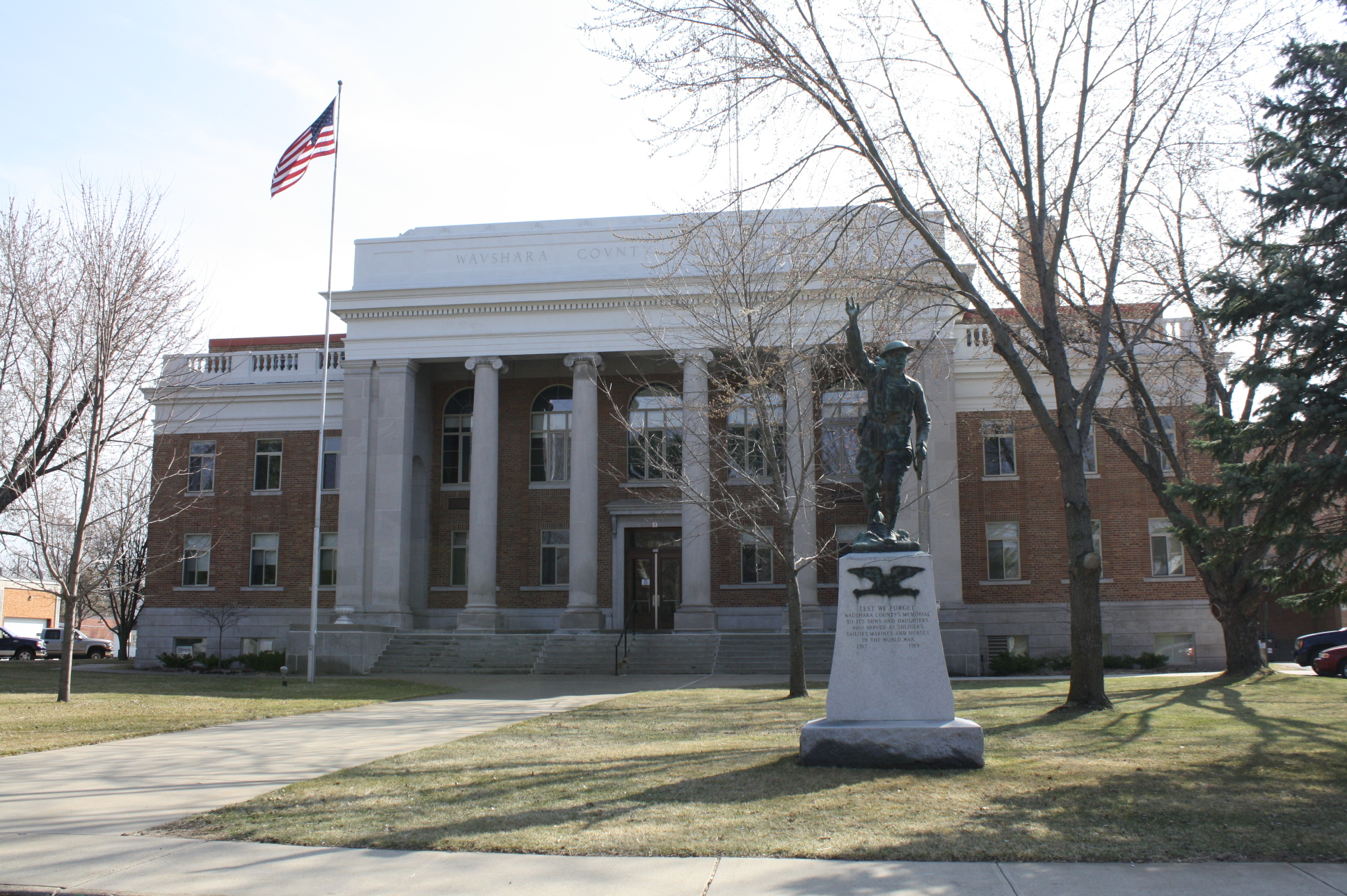
- Waushara County Courthouse

- Location within the U.S. state of Wisconsin
- Coordinates: 44°07′N 89°14′W
- Country: United States
- State: Wisconsin
- Founded: 1852
- Named for: Ho-Chunk term meaning "good earth"
- Seat: Wautoma
- Largest city: Berlin

Area
  - Total: 637 sq mi (1,650 km^{2})
  - Land: 626 sq mi (1,620 km^{2})
  - Water: 11 sq mi (28 km^{2}) 1.8%

Population (2020)
  - Total: 24,520
  - Estimate (2025): 25,223 ▲
  - Density: 39.2/sq mi (15.1/km^{2})
- Time zone: UTC−6 (Central)
  - Summer (DST): UTC−5 (CDT)
- Congressional district: 6th
- Website: www.co.waushara.wi.us

Waushara County is a county located in the U.S. state of Wisconsin. As of the 2020 census, the population was 24,520. Its county seat is Wautoma.

Waushara County is located in central Wisconsin, about 80 miles (130 km) north of Madison.

== History ==
Waushara County was established by an act of the Wisconsin Legislature on February 15, 1851. It originally consisted of a single organized Town of Waushara. In 1852, the county achieved full organization. The county seat was first located at Sacramento and was relocated to Wautoma in 1854 after a bitter fight between proponents of the two places. The name is of Ho-Chunk origin and is believed to mean "good land".

== Geography ==
According to the U.S. Census Bureau, the county has a total area of 637 square miles (1,650 km^{2}), of which 626 square miles (1,620 km^{2}) is land and 11 square miles (28 km^{2}) (1.8%) is water.

=== Major highways ===
- Interstate 39
- U.S. Highway 51
- Highway 21 (Wisconsin)
- Highway 22 (Wisconsin)
- Highway 49 (Wisconsin)
- Highway 73 (Wisconsin)
- Highway 152 (Wisconsin)

=== Airports ===
- Wautoma Municipal Airport (FAA LID: Y50) serves Waushara County and the surrounding communities
- Wild Rose Idlewild Airport (FAA LID: W23) also serves Waushara County and the surrounding communities

=== Adjacent counties ===
- Portage County - north
- Waupaca County - northeast
- Winnebago County - east
- Green Lake County - south
- Marquette County - south
- Adams County - west

== Climate ==
Waushara County

Climate chart (precipitation, max. and min. temperature)
J	F	M	A	M	J	J	A	S	O	N	D
48 −8 −13	57 −6 −13	70 2 −6	132 18 1	131 22 8	133 26 14	64 26 18	116 24 16	73 22 12	116 15 5	54 5 −1	46 −7 −11
- █ Average max. and min. temperatures in °C
- █ Precipitation totals in mm
Imperial conversion
J	F	M	A	M	J	J	A	S	O	N	D
1.9 18 9	2.2 21 9	2.8 36 21	5.2 64 34	5.2 72 46	5.2 79 57	2.5 79 64	4.6 75 61	2.9 72 54	4.6 59 41	2.1 41 30	1.8 19 12
- █ Average max. and min. temperatures in °F
- █ Precipitation totals in inches

== Demographics ==
Historical population
Census	Pop.	Note	%±
1860	8,770		—
1870	11,279		28.6%
1880	12,687		12.5%
1890	13,507		6.5%
1900	15,972		18.2%
1910	18,886		18.2%
1920	16,712		−11.5%
1930	14,427		−13.7%
1940	14,268		−1.1%
1950	13,920		−2.4%
1960	13,497		−3.0%
1970	14,795		9.6%
1980	18,526		25.2%
1990	19,385		4.6%
2000	23,154		19.4%
2010	24,496		5.8%
2020	24,520		0.1%
2025 (est.)	25,223	▲	2.9%
U.S. Decennial Census; 1790–1960 1900–1990; 1990–2000 2010 2020

=== Racial and ethnic composition ===
Waushara County, Wisconsin – Racial and ethnic composition Note: the US Census treats Hispanic/Latino as an ethnic category. This table excludes Latinos from the racial categories and assigns them to a separate category. Hispanics/Latinos may be of any race.
Race / Ethnicity (NH = Non-Hispanic)	Pop 1980	Pop 1990	Pop 2000	Pop 2010	Pop 2020	% 1980	% 1990	% 2000	% 2010	% 2020
White alone (NH)	18,137	18,867	21,939	22,317	21,552	97.90%	97.33%	94.75%	91.10%	87.90%
Black or African American alone (NH)	13	29	53	445	389	0.07%	0.15%	0.23%	1.82%	1.59%
Native American or Alaska Native alone (NH)	37	68	65	107	121	0.20%	0.35%	0.28%	0.44%	0.49%
Asian alone (NH)	28	41	79	90	98	0.15%	0.21%	0.34%	0.37%	0.40%
Native Hawaiian or Pacific Islander alone (NH)	x	x	6	10	14	x	x	0.03%	0.04%	0.06%
Other race alone (NH)	15	1	5	8	50	0.08%	0.01%	0.02%	0.03%	0.20%
Mixed race or Multiracial (NH)	x	x	159	190	603	x	x	0.69%	0.78%	2.46%
Hispanic or Latino (any race)	296	379	848	1,329	1,693	1.60%	1.96%	3.66%	5.43%	6.90%
Total	18,526	19,385	23,154	24,496	24,520	100.00%	100.00%	100.00%	100.00%	100.00%

=== 2020 census ===
As of the 2020 census, the county had a population of 24,520 and a population density of 39.2 people per square mile (15.1 people/km^{2}). The median age was 49.9 years, with 18.2% of residents under the age of 18 and 25.0% aged 65 or older. For every 100 females there were 111.8 males, and for every 100 females age 18 and over there were 114.0 males age 18 and over.

The racial makeup of the county was 89.9% White, 1.6% Black or African American, 0.6% American Indian and Alaska Native, 0.4% Asian, 0.1% Native Hawaiian and Pacific Islander, 2.8% from some other race, and 4.6% from two or more races. Hispanic or Latino residents of any race comprised 6.9% of the population.

0.4% of residents lived in urban areas, while 99.6% lived in rural areas.

There were 10,173 households in the county, of which 22.2% had children under the age of 18 living in them. Of all households, 52.5% were married-couple households, 20.3% had a male householder with no spouse or partner present, and 20.1% had a female householder with no spouse or partner present. About 29.2% of all households were made up of individuals and 15.0% had someone living alone who was 65 years of age or older.

There were 14,710 housing units at an average density of 23.5 units per square mile (9.1 units/km^{2}), of which 30.8% were vacant. Among occupied housing units, 82.7% were owner-occupied and 17.3% were renter-occupied. The homeowner vacancy rate was 1.7% and the rental vacancy rate was 6.7%.

=== 2000 census ===
2000 Census Age Pyramid for Waushara County

As of the census of 2000, there were 23,154 people, 9,336 households, and 6,581 families residing in the county. The population density was 37 people per square mile (14 people/km^{2}). There were 13,667 housing units at an average density of 22 units per square mile (8.5 units/km^{2}). The racial makeup of the county was 96.80% White, 0.27% Black or African American, 0.31% Native American, 0.35% Asian, 0.03% Pacific Islander, 1.36% from other races, and 0.89% from two or more races. 3.66% of the population were Hispanic or Latino of any race. 47.5% were of German, 9.1% Polish, 5.9% Irish, 5.7% American and 5.6% English ancestry. 94.5% spoke English, 3.4% Spanish and 1.4% German as their first language.

There were 9,336 households, out of which 27.60% had children under the age of 18 living with them, 60.00% were married couples living together, 6.70% had a female householder with no husband present, and 29.50% were non-families. 24.90% of all households were made up of individuals, and 11.90% had someone living alone who was 65 years of age or older. The average household size was 2.43 and the average family size was 2.89.

In the county, the population was spread out, with 23.50% under the age of 18, 6.00% from 18 to 24, 24.90% from 25 to 44, 26.30% from 45 to 64, and 19.20% who were 65 years of age or older. The median age was 42 years. For every 100 females there were 101.60 males. For every 100 females age 18 and over, there were 98.80 males.

In 2017, there were 222 births, giving a general fertility rate of 67.3 births per 1000 women aged 15–44, the 22nd highest rate out of all 72 Wisconsin counties. Of these, 19 of the births occurred at home. Additionally, there were 10 reported induced abortions performed on women of Waushara County residence in 2017.

== Communities ==
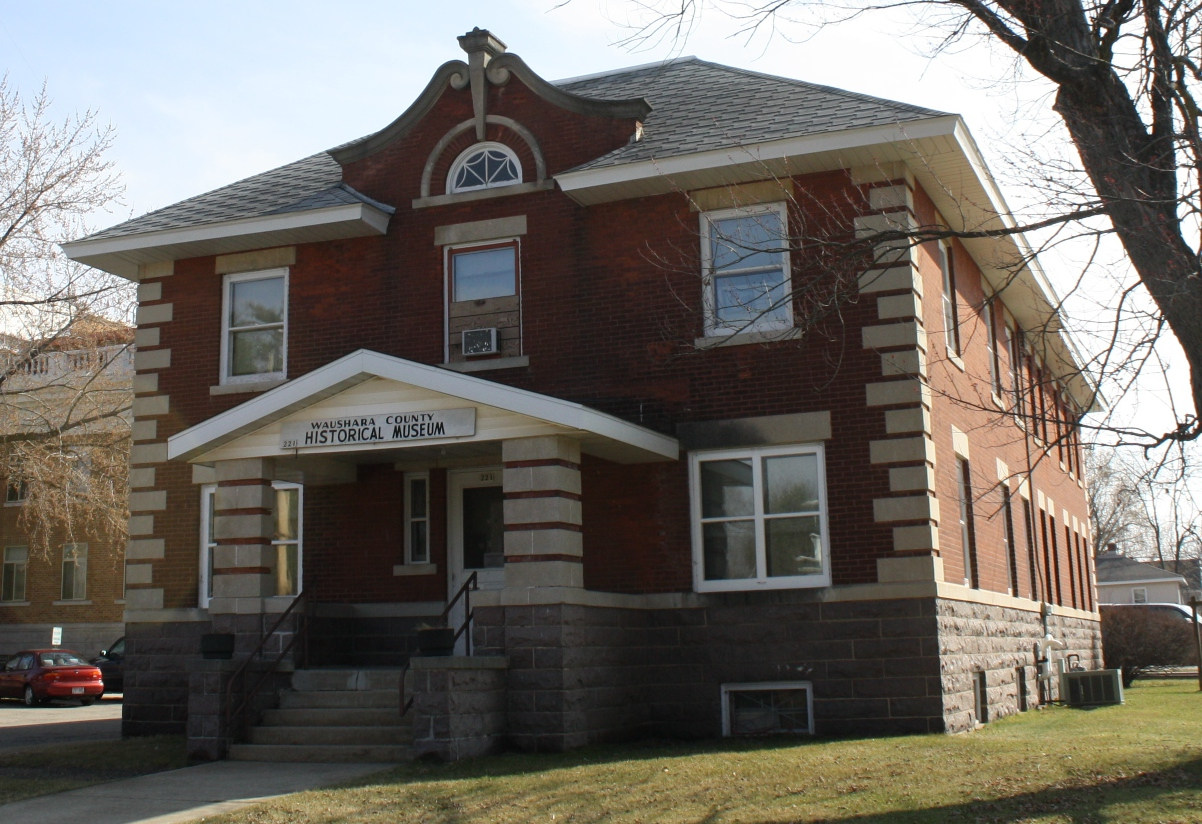
Waushara County Historical Museum

=== Cities ===
- Berlin (mostly in Green Lake County)
- Wautoma (county seat)

=== Villages ===
- Coloma
- Hancock
- Lohrville
- Plainfield
- Redgranite
- Wild Rose

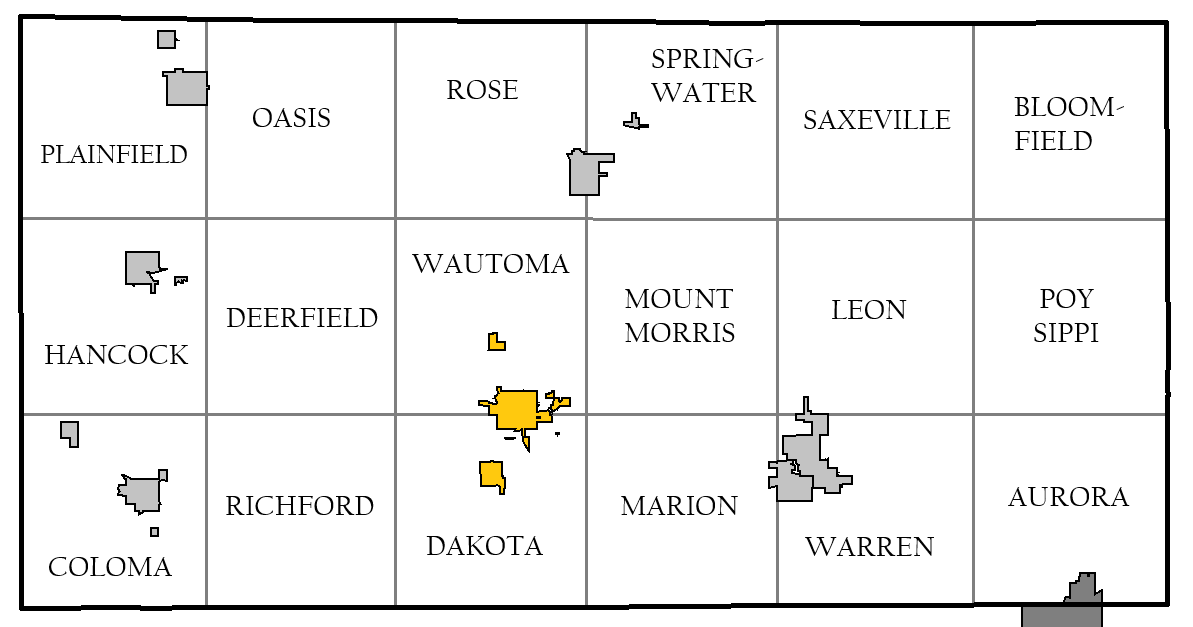
Towns of Waushara County

=== Towns ===
- Aurora
- Bloomfield
- Coloma
- Dakota
- Deerfield
- Hancock
- Leon
- Marion
- Mount Morris
- Oasis
- Plainfield
- Poy Sippi
- Richford
- Rose
- Saxeville
- Springwater
- Warren
- Wautoma

=== Census-designated places ===
- Pine River
- Poy Sippi
- Tustin

=== Unincorporated communities ===
- Auroraville
- Bannerman
- Borth
- Brushville
- Dakota
- Fountain Valley
- Heffron (partially)
- Metz (partial)
- Mount Morris
- Richford
- Saxeville
- Silver Lake
- Spring Lake
- West Bloomfield

=== Ghost towns ===
- Rodney

== Politics ==
United States presidential election results for Waushara County, Wisconsin
Year	Republican		Democratic		Third party(ies)	
Year	No.	%	No.	%	No.	%
1892	2,091	68.47%	786	25.74%	177	5.80%
1896	3,210	84.36%	456	11.98%	139	3.65%
1900	2,990	82.03%	525	14.40%	130	3.57%
1904	3,140	87.34%	325	9.04%	130	3.62%
1908	2,820	79.73%	507	14.33%	210	5.94%
1912	1,343	44.43%	772	25.54%	908	30.04%
1916	2,345	67.31%	1,015	29.13%	124	3.56%
1920	4,176	85.17%	482	9.83%	245	5.00%
1924	1,602	35.43%	249	5.51%	2,671	59.07%
1928	4,068	75.42%	1,260	23.36%	66	1.22%
1932	2,541	44.28%	3,073	53.56%	124	2.16%
1936	3,302	51.43%	2,636	41.05%	483	7.52%
1940	4,872	72.88%	1,747	26.13%	66	0.99%
1944	4,675	75.54%	1,485	23.99%	29	0.47%
1948	3,594	69.60%	1,430	27.69%	140	2.71%
1952	5,447	81.14%	1,242	18.50%	24	0.36%
1956	4,717	76.99%	1,387	22.64%	23	0.38%
1960	4,906	72.16%	1,888	27.77%	5	0.07%
1964	3,437	53.36%	3,004	46.64%	0	0.00%
1968	4,187	65.35%	1,652	25.78%	568	8.87%
1972	4,466	66.27%	2,094	31.07%	179	2.66%
1976	4,449	54.94%	3,485	43.04%	164	2.03%
1980	5,576	61.43%	2,987	32.91%	514	5.66%
1984	5,769	66.79%	2,782	32.21%	86	1.00%
1988	4,953	57.91%	3,535	41.33%	65	0.76%
1992	4,045	39.16%	3,402	32.94%	2,882	27.90%
1996	3,573	40.46%	3,824	43.31%	1,433	16.23%
2000	5,571	54.36%	4,239	41.36%	438	4.27%
2004	6,888	56.25%	5,257	42.93%	101	0.82%
2008	5,770	48.70%	5,868	49.52%	211	1.78%
2012	6,562	54.47%	5,335	44.28%	151	1.25%
2016	7,667	63.50%	3,791	31.40%	616	5.10%
2020	9,016	66.45%	4,388	32.34%	164	1.21%
2024	9,625	67.01%	4,571	31.82%	167	1.16%

Waushara County has long been one of the most Republican counties in Wisconsin. Only three Democrats have carried the county at a presidential level since the formation of the Republican Party – Franklin D. Roosevelt in 1932, Bill Clinton in 1996, and Barack Obama in 2008 – of whom only Roosevelt won an absolute majority; Obama only won the county by 98 votes in 2008. In 1936, when Roosevelt carried Wisconsin by a two-to-one majority, Alf Landon won Waushara County by double digits, while it was one of only three Wisconsin counties, alongside Walworth and Waupaca, to vote for Barry Goldwater over Lyndon Johnson in 1964. It has voted Republican since 2012. In 2024, Donald Trump received the highest percentage of the vote for a Republican since 1960.

In other statewide races, the county is equally Republican. Waushara County has never backed a Democrat for Governor since before 1900. Senators Herb Kohl in 2006 and William Proxmire in 1976 and 1970 did carry Waushara County when they swept every county in the state, but no other Democratic senatorial candidate has won the county since the Seventeenth Amendment.

== See also ==
- National Register of Historic Places listings in Waushara County, Wisconsin
