= Mount Morris (community), Wisconsin =

Mount Morris
- Unincorporated community
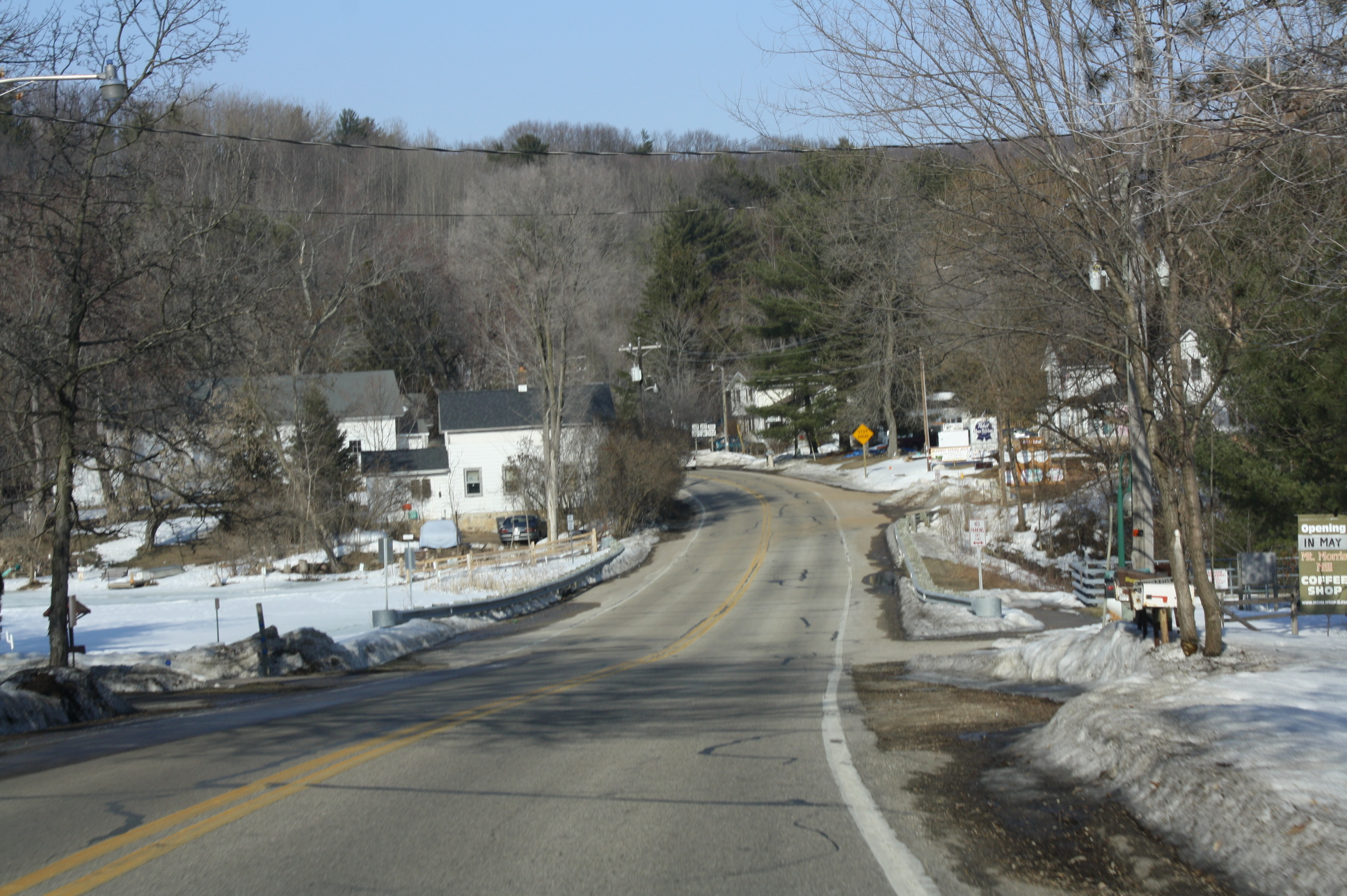
- Looking north on WIS 152

- Location within the state of Wisconsin Mount Morris (the United States)
- Coordinates: 44°06′52″N 89°11′26″W
- Country: United States
- State: Wisconsin
- County: Waushara
- Elevation: 896 ft (273 m)
- Time zone: UTC-6 (Central (CST))
  - Summer (DST): UTC-5 (CDT)
- Area code: 920
- GNIS feature ID: 1569821

Mount Morris is an unincorporated community in the town of Mount Morris in Waushara County, Wisconsin, United States. It is located at the intersection of Wisconsin Highway 152 with County roads W and G. Mount Morris rises approximately 200 feet above the northeastern side of the community and Lake Morris lies along the southwestern side.

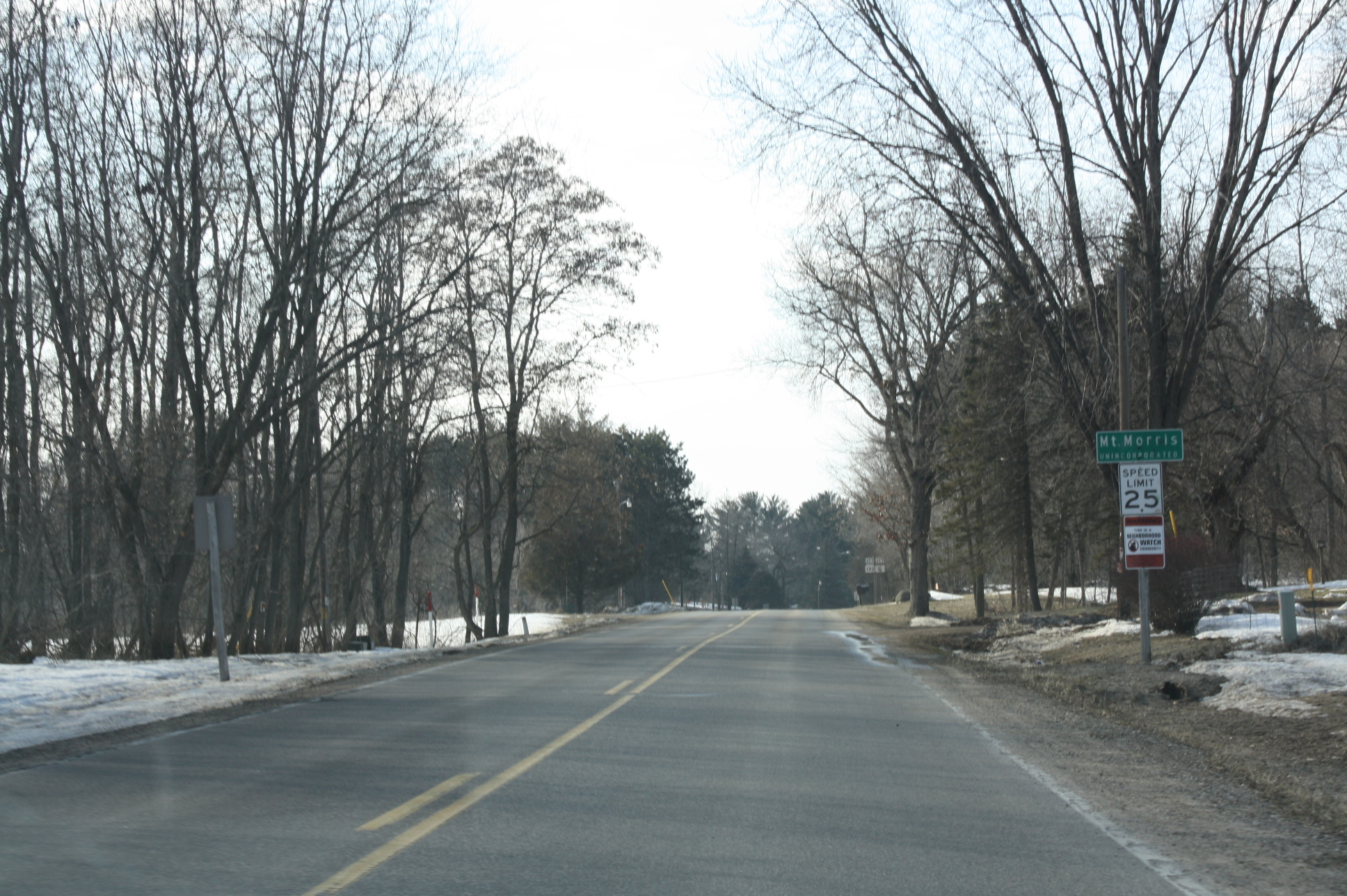
Sign

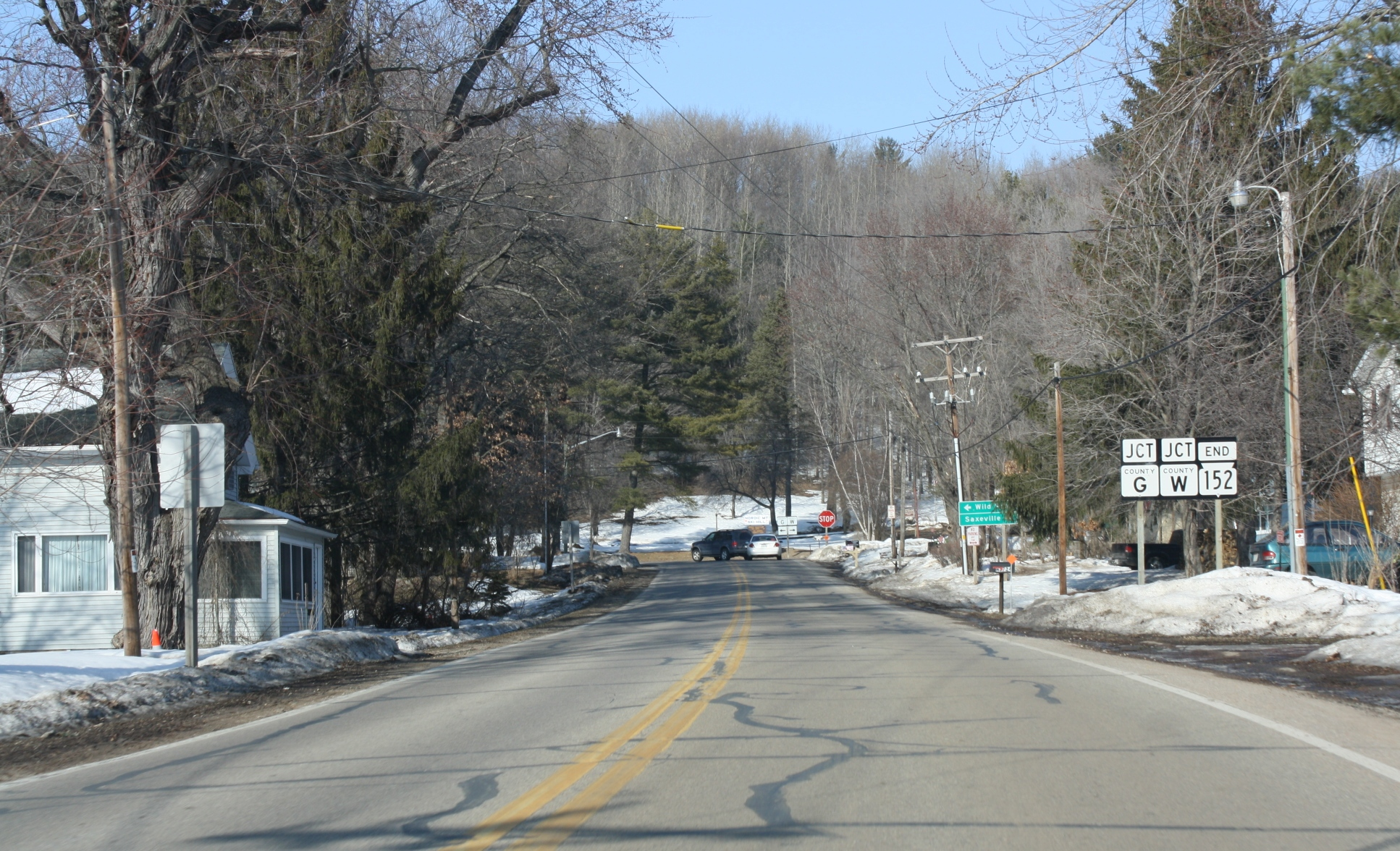
East terminus for WIS 152

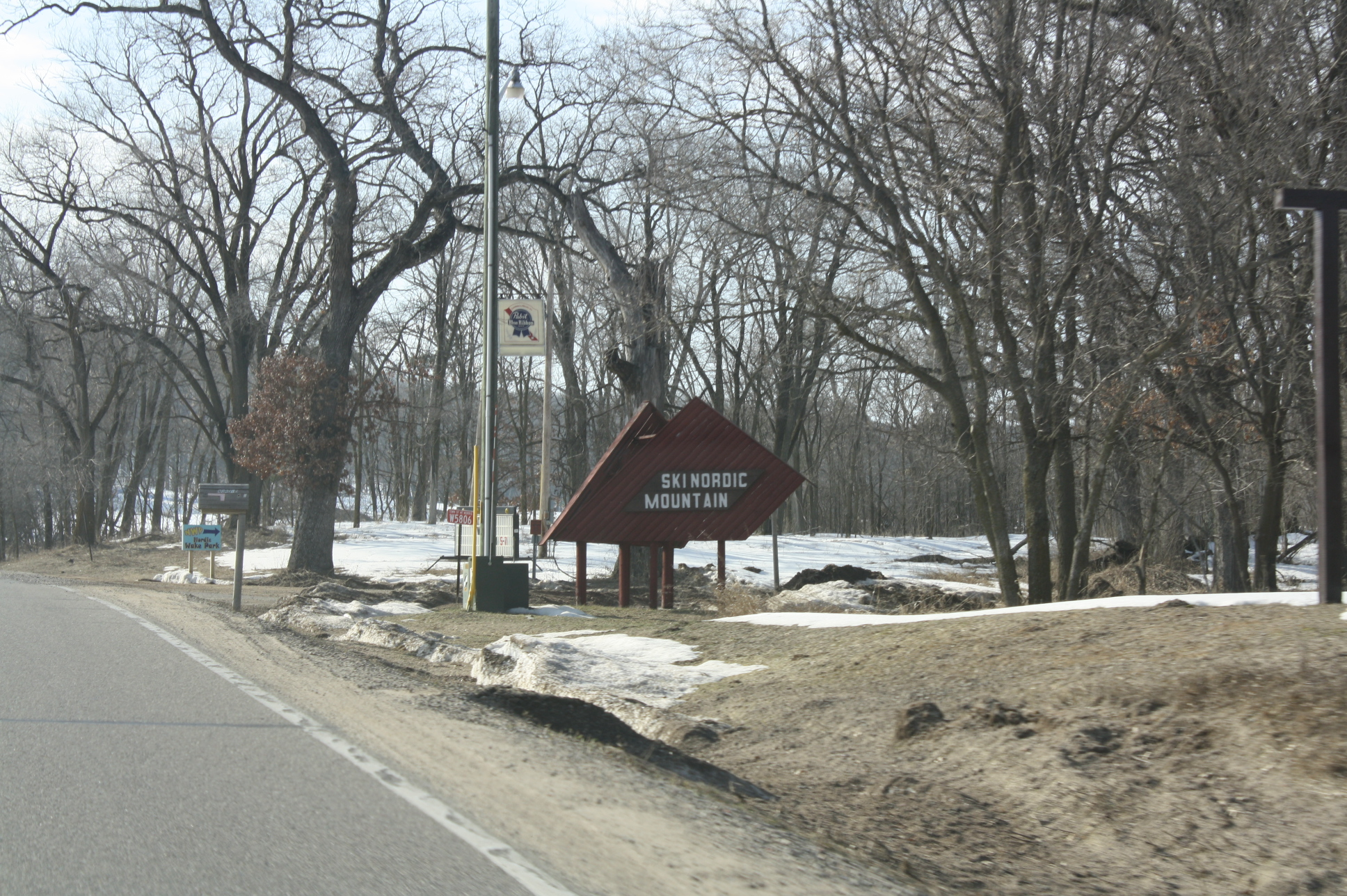
Nordic Mountain sign

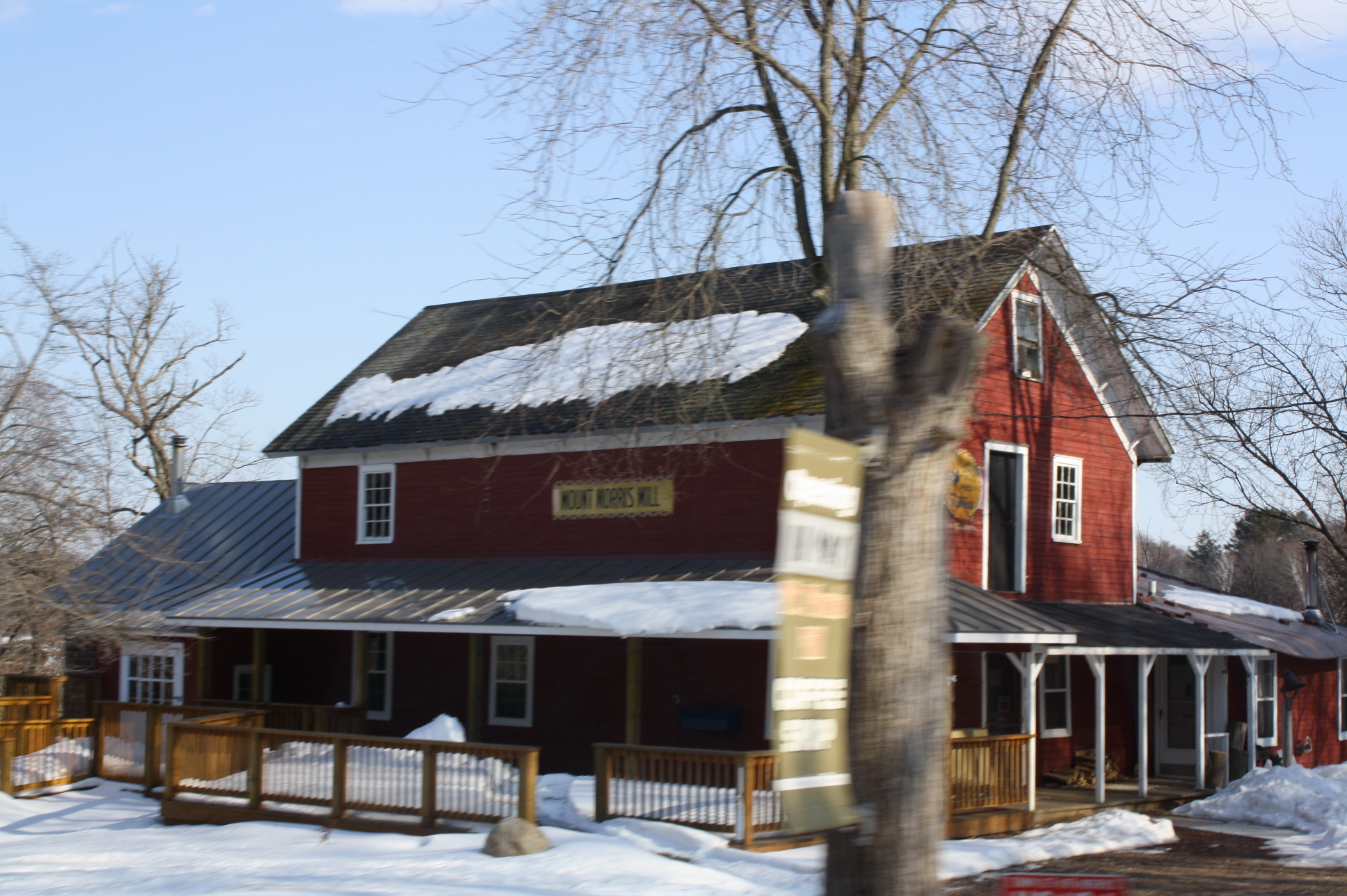
Mill
