= Lohrville, Wisconsin =

- Village
- Location of Lohrville in Waushara County, Wisconsin.
- Coordinates: 44°2′19″N 89°7′17″W
- Country: United States
- State: Wisconsin
- County: Waushara

Area
  - Total: 1.22 sq mi (3.17 km^{2})
  - Land: 1.21 sq mi (3.14 km^{2})
  - Water: 0.012 sq mi (0.03 km^{2})
- Elevation: 804 ft (245 m)

Population (2020)
  - Total: 434
  - Density: 358/sq mi (138/km^{2})
- Time zone: UTC-6 (Central (CST))
  - Summer (DST): UTC-5 (CDT)
- FIPS code: 55-45425
- GNIS feature ID: 1568499

Lohrville is a village in Waushara County, Wisconsin, United States. The population was 434 at the 2020 census.

== History ==
The American Granite Company started quarrying operations in what is now Lohrville in 1906. The village was named for the company's first president, Charles Lohr. Lohrville's population grew as workers moved to the area seeking employment in the quarries, and the Chicago and North Western Railway Company built a spur line to the quarries. The village incorporated in 1910.

By 1920, Lohrville had a population of 245, though by 1940 the population had declined to 191.

The railway has since been abandoned and converted to a rail trail called the Bannerman Trail.

== Geography ==
Lohrville is located at 44°2′19″N 89°7′17″W (44.038700, -89.121266).

According to the United States Census Bureau, the village has a total area of 1.24 square miles (3.21 km^{2}), of which 1.23 square miles (3.19 km^{2}) is land and 0.01 square miles (0.03 km^{2}) is water.

== Demographics ==
Historical population
Census	Pop.	Note	%±
1920	245		—
1930	262		6.9%
1940	191		−27.1%
1950	206		7.9%
1960	225		9.2%
1970	213		−5.3%
1980	336		57.7%
1990	368		9.5%
2000	408		10.9%
2010	402		−1.5%
2020	434		8.0%
U.S. Decennial Census

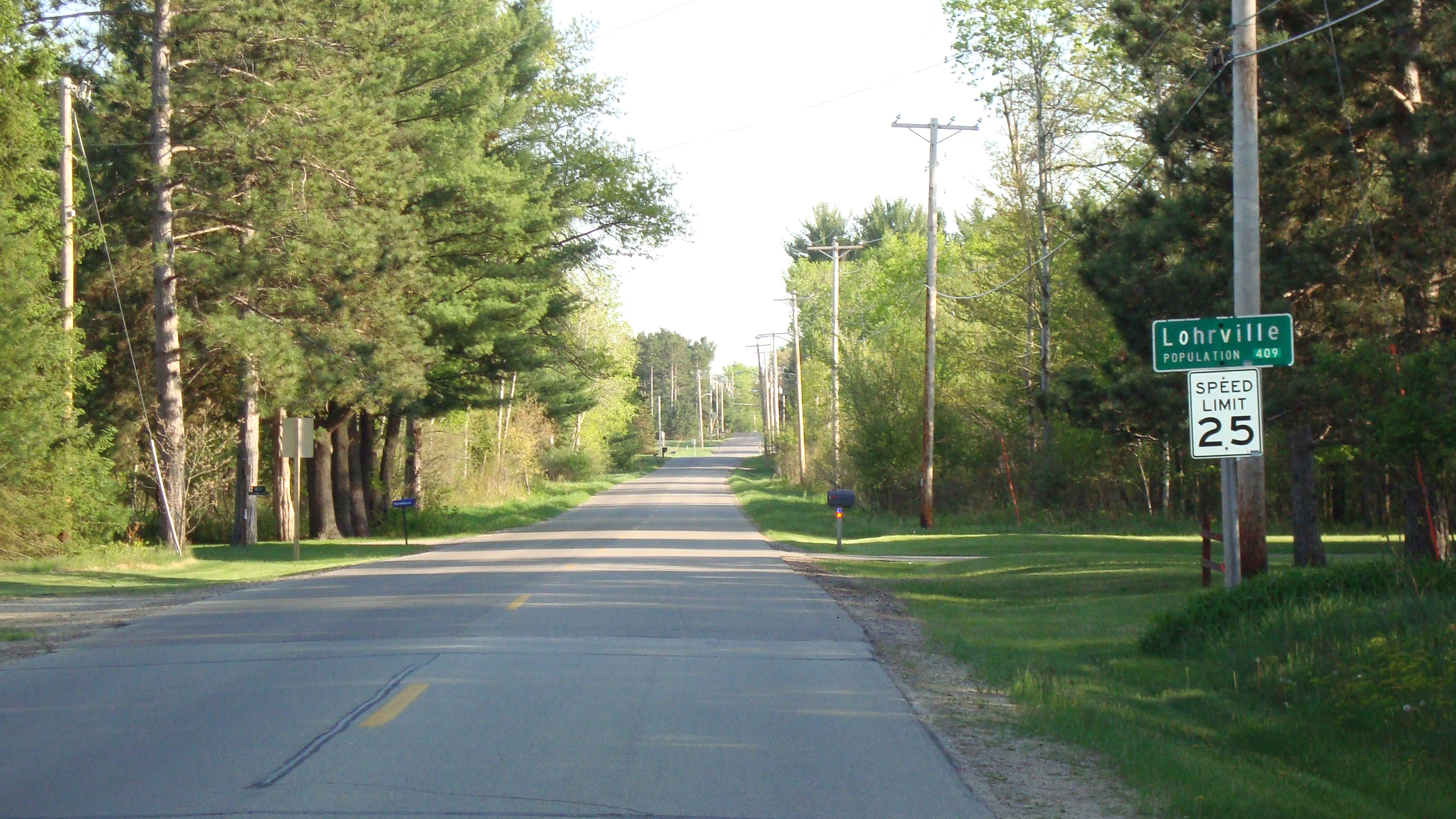
Entering Lohrville

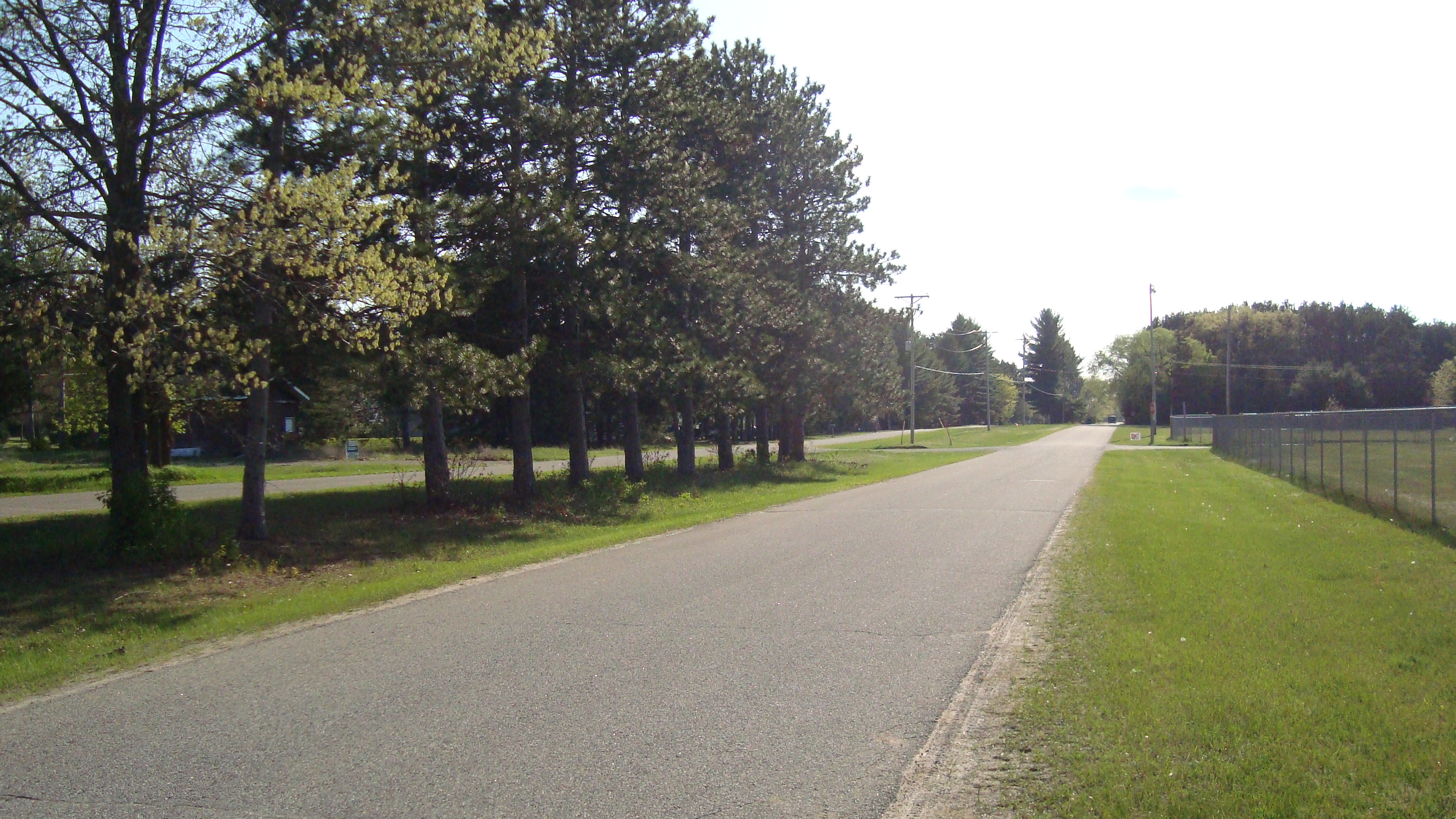
Lohrville looking West

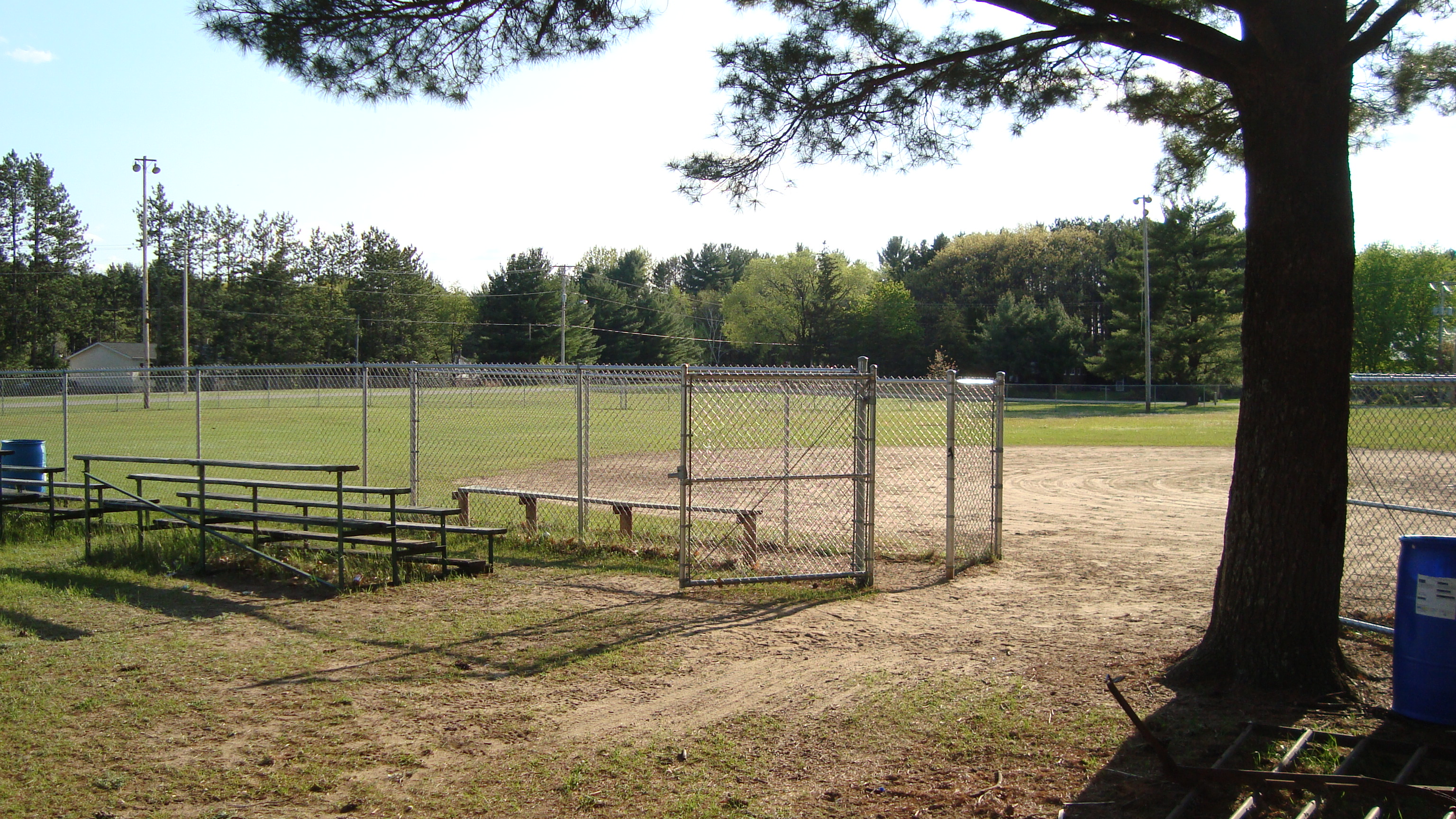
Lohrville baseball field

=== 2010 census ===
As of the census of 2010, there were 402 people, 171 households, and 114 families living in the village. The population density was 326.8 inhabitants per square mile (126.2/km^{2}). There were 198 housing units at an average density of 161.0 units per square mile (62.2 units/km^{2}). The racial makeup of the village was 95.5% White, 0.5% African American, 1.7% Native American, 0.5% Asian, 1.0% from other races, and 0.7% from two or more races. Hispanic or Latino of any race were 4.0% of the population.

There were 171 households, of which 22.8% had children under the age of 18 living with them, 50.3% were married couples living together, 9.9% had a female householder with no husband present, 6.4% had a male householder with no wife present, and 33.3% were non-families. 26.9% of all households were made up of individuals, and 12.3% had someone living alone who was 65 years of age or older. The average household size was 2.35 and the average family size was 2.72.

The median age in the village was 45.4 years. 19.2% of residents were under the age of 18; 8.7% were between the ages of 18 and 24; 21.4% were from 25 to 44; 32.9% were from 45 to 64; and 17.9% were 65 years of age or older. The gender makeup of the village was 47.5% male and 52.5% female.

=== 2000 census ===
As of the census of 2000, there were 408 people, 168 households, and 122 families living in the village. The population density was 333.5 people per square mile (128.8 people/km^{2}). There were 192 housing units at an average density of 156.9 units per square mile (60.6 units/km^{2}). The racial makeup of the village was 96.81% White, 0.25% Native American, 1.23% from other races, and 1.72% from two or more races. Hispanic or Latino of any race were 2.21% of the population.

There were 168 households, out of which 26.2% had children under the age of 18 living with them, 59.5% were married couples living together, 7.7% had a female householder with no husband present, and 26.8% were non-families. 22.6% of all households were made up of individuals, and 8.9% had someone living alone who was 65 years of age or older. The average household size was 2.43 and the average family size was 2.80.

In the village, the population was spread out, with 23.5% under the age of 18, 5.6% from 18 to 24, 24.5% from 25 to 44, 26.2% from 45 to 64, and 20.1% who were 65 years of age or older. The median age was 42 years. For every 100 females, there were 102.0 males. For every 100 females age 18 and over, there were 105.3 males.

The median income for a household in the village was $34,479, and the median income for a family was $36,500. Males had a median income of $27,813 versus $22,000 for females. The per capita income for the village was $14,386. About 1.6% of families and 3.1% of the population were below the poverty line, including none of those under age 18 and 6.8% of those age 65 or over.
