= Mount Morris, Wisconsin =

- Town
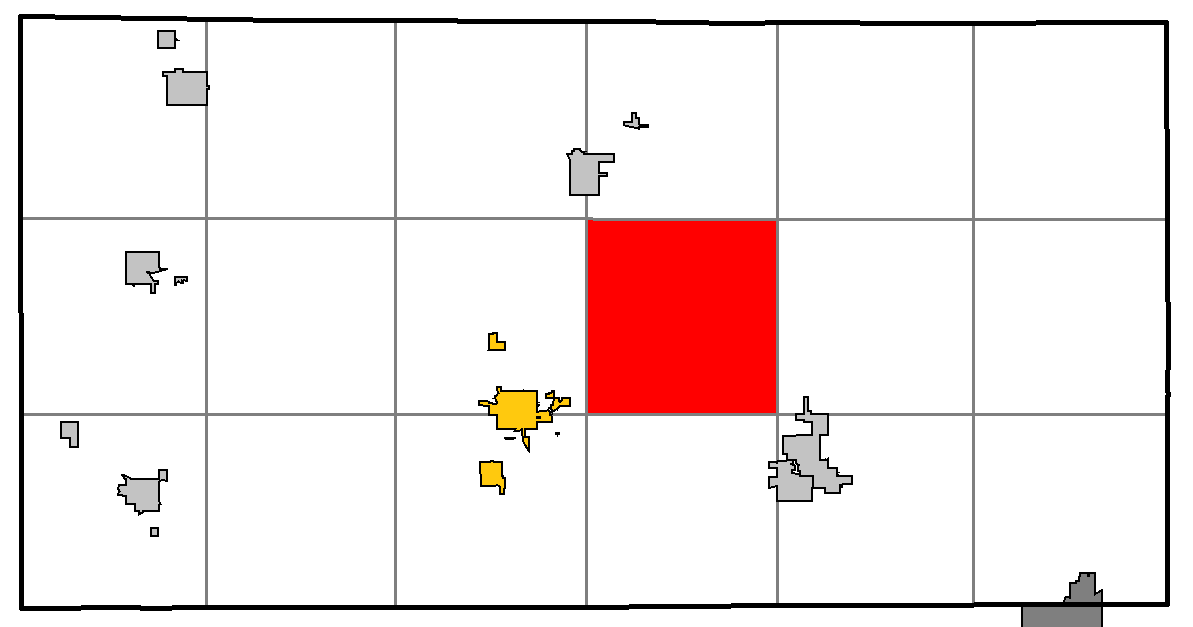
- Location of Mount Morris, Wisconsin

- Location of Waushara County, Wisconsin
- Coordinates: 44°6′45″N 89°10′53″W
- Country: United States
- State: Wisconsin
- County: Waushara

Area
  - Total: 35.2 sq mi (91.2 km^{2})
  - Land: 34.2 sq mi (88.6 km^{2})
  - Water: 1.0 sq mi (2.6 km^{2})
- Elevation: 850 ft (259 m)

Population (2020)
  - Total: 1,096
  - Density: 32.0/sq mi (12.4/km^{2})
- Time zone: UTC-6 (Central (CST))
  - Summer (DST): UTC-5 (CDT)
- FIPS code: 55-54825
- GNIS feature ID: 1583765
- Website: https://townofmountmorris.wi.gov/

Mount Morris is a town in central Waushara County, Wisconsin, United States. The population was 1,096 at the 2020 census. The unincorporated community of Mount Morris is located in the town.

== Geography ==
According to the United States Census Bureau, the town has a total area of 35.2 square miles (91.2 km^{2}), of which 34.2 square miles (88.6 km^{2}) is land and 1.0 square mile (2.6 km^{2}) (2.84%) is water.

== Demographics ==
As of the census of 2000, there were 1,092 people, 481 households, and 344 families residing in the town. The population density was 31.9 people per square mile (12.3/km^{2}). There were 994 housing units at an average density of 29.0 per square mile (11.2/km^{2}). The racial makeup of the town was 98.26% White, 0.27% Native American, 0.18% Asian, and 1.28% from two or more races. Hispanic or Latino of any race were 0.82% of the population.

There were 481 households, out of which 22.2% had children under the age of 18 living with them, 63.2% were married couples living together, 6.0% had a female householder with no husband present, and 28.3% were non-families. 24.5% of all households were made up of individuals, and 11.4% had someone living alone who was 65 years of age or older. The average household size was 2.27 and the average family size was 2.67.

In the town, the population was spread out, with 20.2% under the age of 18, 5.0% from 18 to 24, 20.9% from 25 to 44, 32.6% from 45 to 64, and 21.2% who were 65 years of age or older. The median age was 47 years. For every 100 females, there were 105.6 males. For every 100 females age 18 and over, there were 103.0 males.

The median income for a household in the town was $39,732, and the median income for a family was $45,114. Males had a median income of $34,861 versus $24,261 for females. The per capita income for the town was $20,713. About 5.9% of families and 7.3% of the population were below the poverty line, including 10.0% of those under age 18 and 4.0% of those age 65 or over.

== Notable people ==
- Emil Keup, Wisconsin State Representative and businessman, lived in the town; Keup served as chairman of the Mount Morris Town Board
