= MetroPaint =

MetroPaint was a recycled-content latex paint (RCLP) that was produced in Portland, Oregon, United States by Metro from 1992 to 2025. Metro shut down the operation due to increasing operating costs, outdated processing equipment and other paint recycling options that had developed.

Metro received post-consumer latex paint (PCLP) from garbage customers. Technicians inspected the paint for recyclability: recyclable paint was sorted by color, and unrecyclable paint was disposed in landfills. The recyclable paint was then color-corrected. Additives were blended in, and the paint was then filtered, performance tested, packaged into pails and cans, and sold back to the public at a price intended to recover the program's labor and material costs.

== RCLP classification ==
The majority of MetroPaint was produced as a consolidated recycled latex paint, which meant the content of post-consumer latex paint (PCLP) was a minimum of 95%. The balance of the ingredients may be post-industrial latex paint or chemical additives. This is contrasted with "remanufactured" latex paint, which must contain a minimum of 50% PCLP.

Metro manufactured the paint primarily as an interior/exterior application, low-sheen finish, in two quality grades: Standard and Green Seal Certified. MetroPaint was the first recycled latex paint to receive certification under the Green Seal GS-43 Recycled Content Latex Paint environmental standard.

== Program history ==
Metro began collecting and recycling post-consumer latex paint (PCLP) from the public in 1991 as part of its household hazardous waste program. While not considered a hazardous waste, latex paint was received by regional garbage customers along with hazardous wastes such as oil-based paints, pesticides, solvents, and cleaners. In an effort to handle the latex paint in a cost-effective, environmentally-responsible manner, Metro decided to recycle the reusable latex paint and return it to the public.

Initially sorted into only about 5 or 6 basic colors, the latex paint was bulked into 55-gallon drums and then donated to charitable non-profit organizations or given away to public customers at no charge. Metro encountered difficulties in both finding a market for the drums of paint and in efficiently recycling the paint.

In August 1999, Metro opened their first latex paint recycling facility in Oregon City, Oregon, USA. This combined recycling and retail center allowed for more efficient processing of the paint, and packaging into more marketable 5-gallon pails. At the same time, Metro began selling the paint back to the public at a price intended to recoup the program's labor and material costs, which placed the product's price up to 80% less than that of comparable new paint. By this time, Metro's color palette was increased to about 10 to 12 basic colors. Metro also introduced the "Color Blending Guide", which showed customers that other colors could be created by blending together the basic MetroPaint colors.

As the paint gained in popularity with homeowners, painters, and landlords, these customers affectionately dubbed the product "MetroPaint," a truncated version of "Metro’s recycled latex paint".

Metro partnered with Rodda Paint in January 2001 to conduct quality performance testing in an effort to quantitatively demonstrate that MetroPaint was comparable to conventional latex paint. Metro developed a pail label and brand image for MetroPaint. Considerable efforts were given to marketing the paint, including selling the paint through a few small dealers, though the vast majority of paint sales occurred at the MetroPaint store. In April 2003, Metro improved the marketability of MetroPaint by selling it in 1-gallon cans. In February 2005, Metro relocated the recycling and sales to a new facility, located on Swan Island in Portland, Oregon, USA.

As a result of the Product Stewardship Institution's National Paint Dialog, in August 2007, MetroPaint became the first recycled latex paint to be certified under Green Seal's new GS-43 Recycled Content Latex Paint environmental standard. This third-party certification attested that MetroPaint is an environmentally-responsible product that performs as well as conventional latex paint.

Metro developed a new brand image to coincide with the Green Seal certification. In July 2008, Metro began selling "specialty" colors in 1-quart cans. By February 2009, MetroPaint's color palette had expanded to about 20 basic colors, several "potpourri" colors, the specialty quart colors, and the color blending guide. In June 2009, Metro partnered with Miller Paint as a major dealer for the Certified MetroPaint product line.

== Color sorting ==
Annually, Metro handles about 270,000 liquid gallons of latex paint received in about 525,000 pails and cans. Technicians inspect the label and contents of each container to ensure that only latex paint meeting specific requirements is recycled.

Metro sorts the recyclable latex paint into about 20 basic colors. The majority of these colors are standardized, that is, Metro repeatedly produces these colors consistently from batch to batch. However, a portion of the recyclable paint does not "fit" with these standard colors; as appropriate, Metro produces these colors as limited "special" colors to augment the standard colors and reduce the amount of paint wasted in landfills.

== Paint packaging ==
Metro bulks the color-sorted processed recyclable latex paint into intermediate bulk containers (IBC) or "totes." Between one and three of these totes are produced and packaged as a batch or lot; a typical batch of MetroPaint is between 300 and 900 gallons.

Prior to packaging, technicians adjusted the batch's color to match the "standardized" target color using other recycled latex paint; no tints or colorants are used. Once a precise visual match was achieved, a small amount of additives, such as thickeners or preservatives, may be blended into the batch.

The prepared batch of paint was then filtered to remove any particulate matter and packaged into 5-gallon pails, 1-gallon cans, or 1-quart cans.

== Performance ==
Since August 2007, Metro produced some of the paint as Green Seal "Certified" MetroPaint. This paint was certified by Green Seal to meet the requirements for environmental responsibility per Green Seal's GS-43 Standard for Recycled Content Latex Paint.

The Green Seal GS-43 Standard requires that the paint's performance meets the applicable Master Painters Institute's (MPI) detailed paint performance standards. As a result, Certified MetroPaint also meets the MPI consolidated recycled latex paint performance requirements for #10-RC (exterior low-sheen) and either #53-RC (interior flat) or #44-RC (interior velvet).

The majority of "Standard" MetroPaint was also performance tested against the same criteria and requirements.

Metro offered limited warranties on both Standard and Certified MetroPaint.

== Pricing ==
Metro set the price of MetroPaint to leverage the supply and demand for each color in an effort to recover 100% of the Metro Latex Paint Recycling program's labor and materials costs, with this goal never being fully realized, until the Oregon Paint Stewardship law went into effect, resulting in PaintCare.

Beginning July 2010, Metro became the PaintCare-contracted latex paint recycler for latex paint collected throughout the state of Oregon instead of just the Portland, Oregon metropolitan region. The revenue generated by this contract should enable the labor and material costs of this Metro program to be covered.

== Waste latex paint ==
About 25% of the post-consumer latex paint received is unrecyclable. This waste latex paint is injected into a landfill in an effort to use the liquids to facilitate garbage decomposition.

== Notes ==
- "MetroPaint: quality recycled latex paint." Metro. N.p., n.d. Web. 2 July 2010. <http://www.oregonmetro.gov/index.cfm/go/by.web/id=521>.
- "MetroFAQS". Metro. <http://www.co.washington.or.us/HHS/SWR/Recycling/loader.cfm?csModule=security/getfile&pageid=578201>
