= East Buttes =

Coordinates: 45.481739°N 122.438421°W

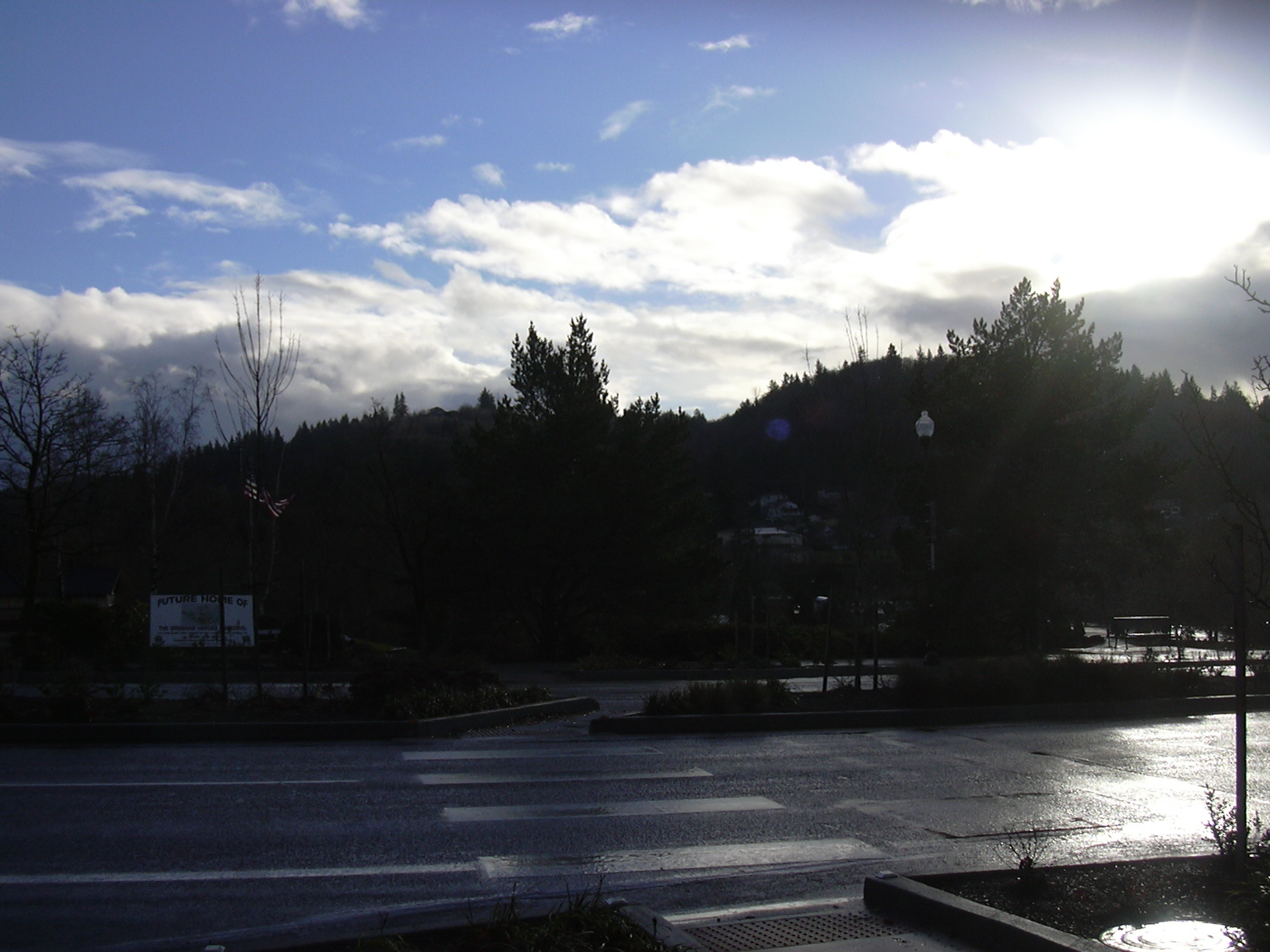
Gabbert Hill (left) and Walter's Hill, from North near Main City Park

The East Buttes are made up of several extinct volcanoes in and around Gresham, Oregon, United States, which are part of the Boring Lava Field. The Boring Lava Field became active at least 2.7 million years ago, and has been extinct for about 300,000 years.

The buttes stretch from southeast Portland into Damascus. Included are Gresham Butte (also known as Walter's Hill), Gabbert Hill, and Towle Butte.

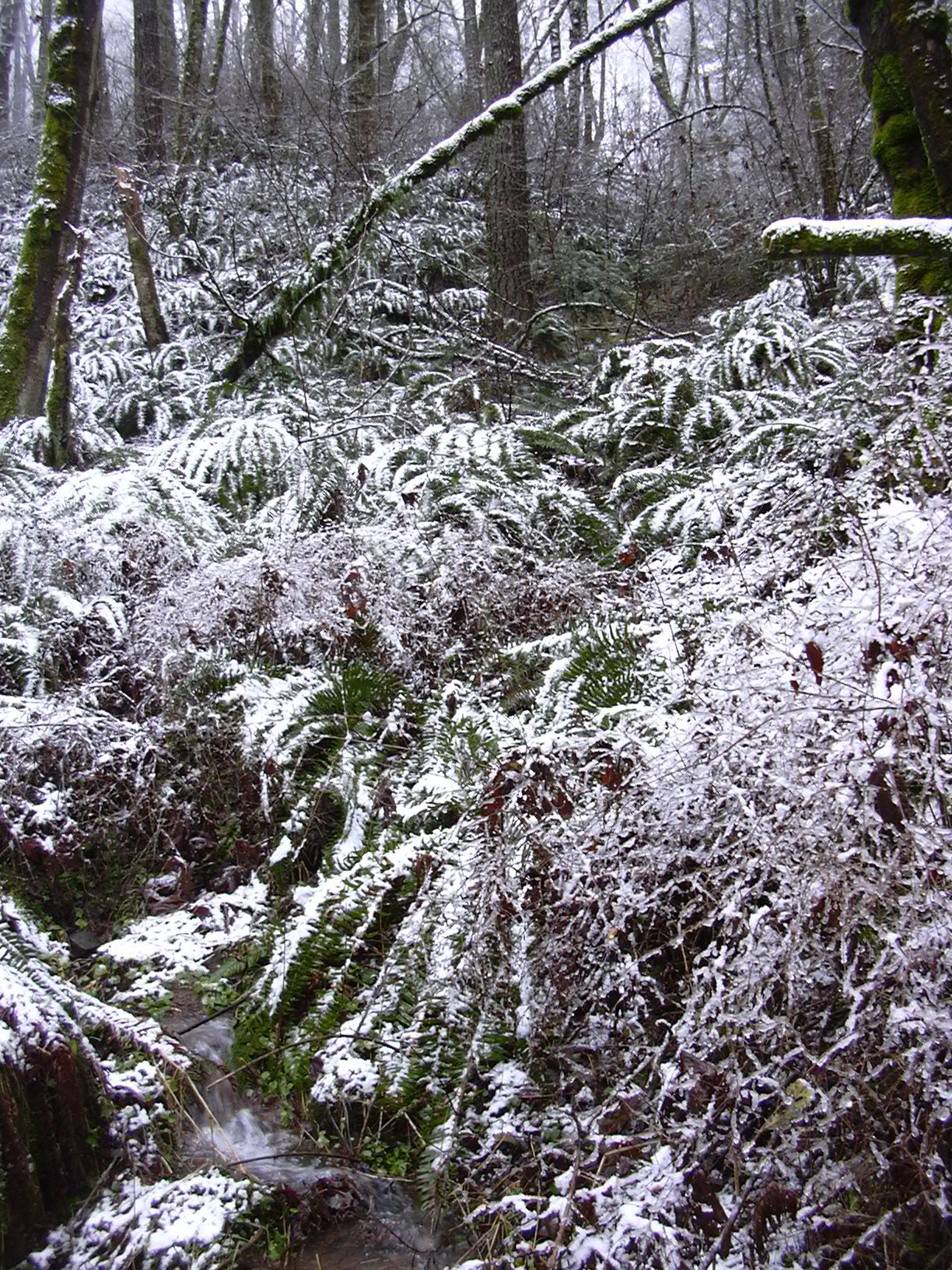
East Buttes natural area near Saddle Trail

The Gresham Butte Saddle Trail runs through open space owned by Metro and the City of Gresham. The trail was previously a logging road and is bordered on the north by Gresham Butte and on the south by Towle Butte and Gabbert Hill. Several tributaries of Johnson Creek are located in this open space. The land in this area is dominated by black cottonwood, red alder, and Douglas-fir. There are also many non-native species present, such as Himalayan blackberry and European holly, a large stand of which is found around the middle of Saddle Trail. Somewhere in the forest is an old bus used to move water pipes for the planned Mount Hood Freeway. The project and the bus were abandoned in the 1970s after a mass public outcry against the proposed freeway.

Much of the land on Gabbert Hill was previously designated for a subdivision called Darby Ridge, but was acquired by Metro and the City of Gresham in 2007.

== List of Buttes ==
Name	City	Elevation (approx.)
East Bliss Butte	Damascus	1,129 ft (344 m)
Sunshine Butte	Damascus	1,080 ft (329 m)
Zion Hill (Boring Peak)	Boring	1,013 ft (309 m)
Towle Butte	Gresham	997 ft (304 m)
Scouters Mountain	Happy Valley	944 ft (288 m)
Hogan Butte	Gresham	930 ft (283 m)
West Bliss Butte	Damascus	922 ft (281 m)
Gresham Butte (Walter's Hill)	Gresham	858 ft (262 m)
Grant Butte	Gresham	658 ft (201 m)
Jenne Butte	Gresham	630 ft (192 m)
Powell Butte	Portland	614 ft (187 m)
Clatsop Butte	Portland	577 ft (176 m)
