= Smith and Bybee Wetlands Natural Area =

Public park and nature reserve in Portland, Oregon, U.S.

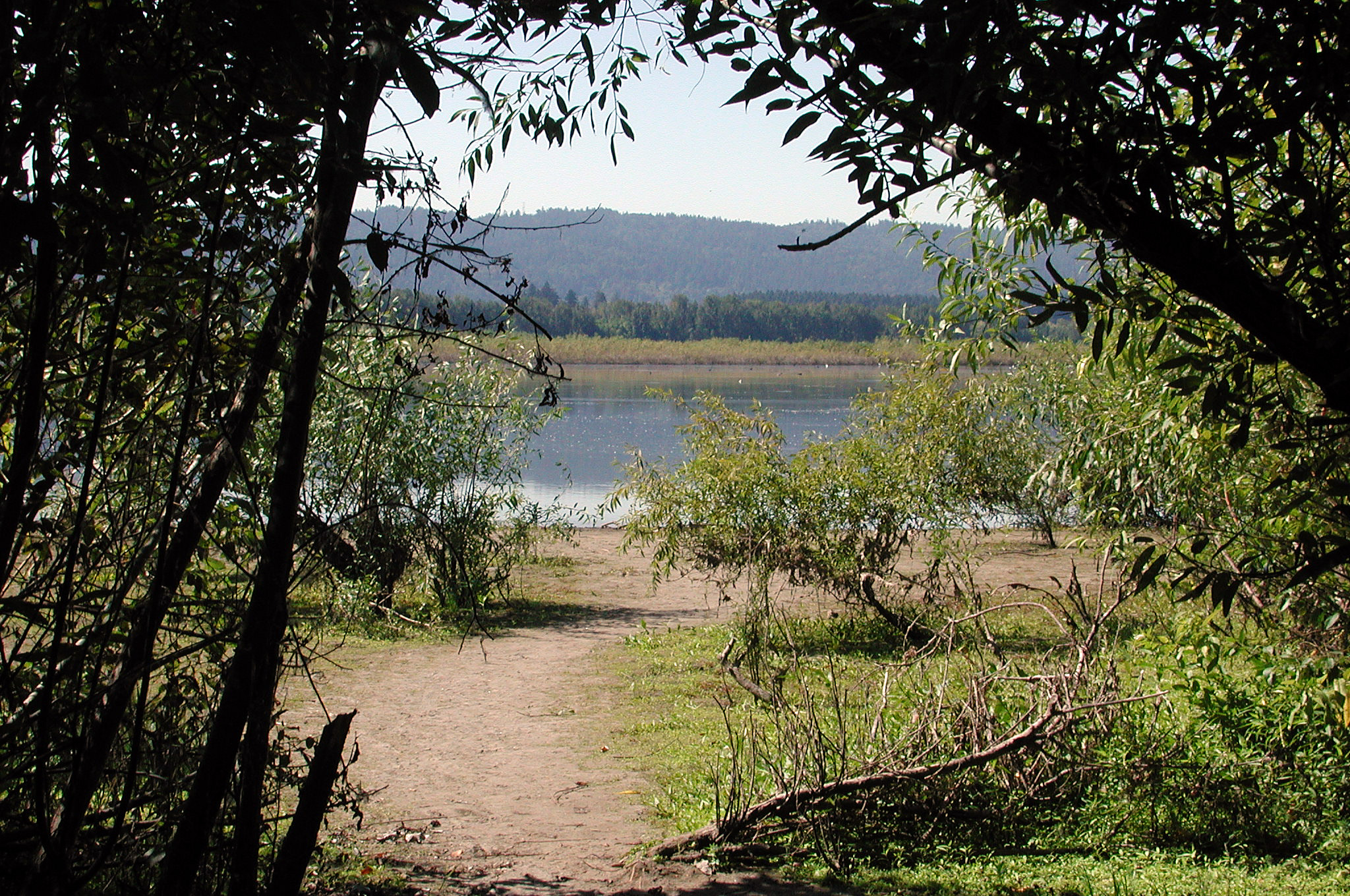
- Smith Lake from north shore, 2008

- Location within Oregon
- Location: Portland, Multnomah, Oregon, United States
- Coordinates: 45°37′02″N 122°46′42″W
- Area: 2,000 acres (8.1 km^{2})
- Elevation: 20 ft (6.1 m)
- Governing body: Metro Regional Government
- Website: Smith and Bybee Wetlands

Smith and Bybee Wetlands Natural Area is a public park and nature reserve between the Columbia Slough and the Columbia River in Portland, Oregon. At about 2,000 acres (810 ha), it is one of the largest urban freshwater wetlands in the United States. Metro, the regional government for the Oregon part of the Portland metropolitan area, manages the park. A covered shelter, restrooms, a paved walkway, and a canoe launch lie on the north side of the natural area.

Although surrounded by port terminals, warehouses, and commercial areas, Smith and Bybee Wetlands Natural Area provides habitat for a wide variety of wildlife including beaver, bald eagles and western painted turtles. An artificial water-control system helps keep the wetlands wet. Other systems collect methane and prevent leaching from a closed landfill near the south edge of the park.

== Access and amenities ==
The 2,000-acre (810 ha) park includes restrooms, interpretive displays, a covered shelter, parking for 40 cars, a bus drop-off, and public art, all near North Marine Drive, which skirts the north edge of the wetland. The parking lot is about 2.5 miles (4.0 km) west of the Delta Park – Marine Drive West exit from Interstate 5. A paved, wheelchair-accessible path called the Interlakes Trail leads from the parking lot to two wildlife viewing platforms between the lakes. Boaters in non-motorized craft can use the park's canoe-launch to enter the lakes for recreation, wildlife viewing, or fishing for non-native species. Bicyclists and walkers can reach the park via a bicycle path, which runs along North Marine Drive and is part of the Portland metropolitan area's system of greenway trails known as the 40-Mile Loop.

== Vegetation and wildlife ==
Black cottonwood, Oregon ash, red alder, big leaf maple, willows, and shrubs grow in the park's forests. Some of the ash trees are more than 100 years old. Swamps include willow thickets, red-osier dogwoods, spiraea, and other small shrubs. Sedges, rushes, beggars tick, rice cutgrass, and reed canary grass grow in open meadows. Aquatic plants such as pond lilies, duckweed, and algae flourish in the sloughs and ponds.

The wide variety of mammals inhabiting the park include beaver, nutria, river otter, cottontail rabbit, raccoon, muskrat, blacktail deer, mink, and coyote. The only reptiles found at the lakes are garter snakes and turtles, including more than 200 western painted turtles, listed as a sensitive-critical species by the Oregon Department of Fish and Wildlife. This listing means that unless the turtles reverse the downward trend in their population, the species could become listed as threatened or endangered. Amphibians include salamanders and frogs such as the Pacific chorus frog and the non-native bullfrog. Non-native fish introduced to the lakes include largemouth bass, crappie, bluegill, and carp.

Most species of waterbirds and migrant songbirds in the region visit the park. Birds observed in the wetlands include bald eagles, house wrens, yellow warblers, red-eyed vireos, goldfinches, great horned owls, red-tailed hawks, great egrets, and double-crested cormorants, as many as a thousand at a time.

== Restoration projects ==
Historically, the wetland lay in the floodplain of the Columbia and Willamette rivers, and seasonal floods inundated the area. Development, including dredging, piping, and levees to prevent flooding drastically changed the area's hydrology. In 2003, to help restore historic hydrologic cycles in the wetland, Ducks Unlimited installed a water-control structure at Bybee Lake. Metro uses it to hold as much water as possible in the lake during winter and spring. This improves habitat for waterfowl and young salmon and inhibits reed canary grass, an invasive plant. In June, after the salmon have migrated to the ocean, Metro opens the structure. Until it closes the structure again, water from the Columbia Slough, which is affected by semidiurnal tides and to which Bybee Lake is connected, flows into and out of the lake.

South of Bybee Lake the park extends to the former St. Johns Landfill, which served as the region’s main garbage-disposal site from 1940 to 1991. Although most of the garbage at the 238-acre (96 ha) site came from households, between 1958 and 1962 some came from a pesticide-manufacturing plant. Metro took over the landfill from the City of Portland in 1990 and by 1996 had completed a $36 million cover system to keep contaminants from leaching into the surrounding soil and water. Another system collects methane gas from beneath the cover and pipes it to a nearby cement company to use as fuel.

== See also ==
- List of lakes in Oregon

== Works cited ==
- Houck, Mike, and Cody, M.J., eds. (2000). Wild in the City. Portland, Oregon: Oregon Historical Society Press. ISBN 0-87595-273-9.
