= Whitaker Ponds Nature Park =

Public park in Portland, Oregon, U.S.

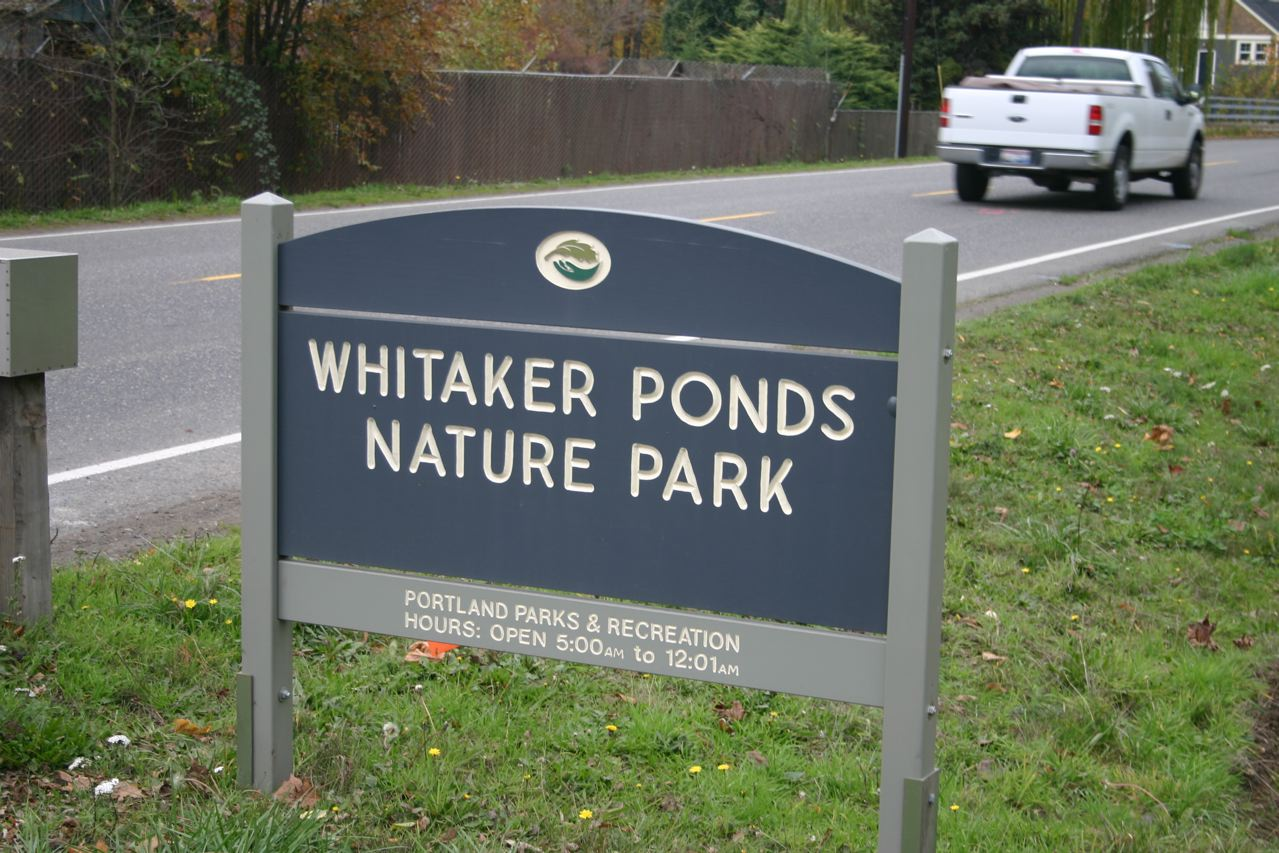
- Park signage in 2008
- Interactive map of Whitaker Ponds Nature Park
- Location: 7040 Northeast 47th Avenue
- Nearest city: Portland, Oregon, United States
- Coordinates: 45.57384°N 122.6119°W
- Area: 24.75 acres (10.02 ha)
- Created: 1998
- Operator: Portland Parks & Recreation

Whitaker Ponds Nature Park is a park located in northeast Portland, Oregon, United States. The park is maintained by Portland Parks & Recreation and volunteers from the Columbia Slough Watershed Council.

In 1995, Metro and the City of Portland each purchased several land parcels at Whitaker Ponds for use as a public park. Members of the local EnviroCorps program planted native species and removed garbage from the site over the summer of 1995. The park was expanded by more land purchases in 1997 and 2004.

The Whitaker Ponds are two shallow freshwater ponds connected by a metal culvert. In 1995, their combined size was estimated to be 11 acres. A black cottonwood forest grows around the ponds. Mammals seen in the park include beavers, coyotes, and river otters. Bird species include downy woodpeckers, great blue herons, osprey, and willow flycatchers.

Nearby is Neerchokikoo, a pre-colonial Chinookan village revitalized as a gathering site for Native Americans in Portland.

== See also ==
- List of parks in Portland, Oregon
