= American Coatings Association =

Non-profit trade association

- Abbreviation: ACA
- Type: Nonprofit
- Website: paint.org

The American Coatings Association (ACA) is a non-profit trade association representing the paint and coatings industry in the United States. ACA advocates on legislative and regulatory matters that affect its membership, including paint and coatings manufacturers, distributors, suppliers of raw materials and other industry professionals. ACA's chairman is Jeffrey J. Powell, and its vice-chairman and treasurer is Chase Bean.

== History ==
The National Paint, Varnish and Lacquer Association (NPVLA) was founded in 1933 with the merger of the two existing national organizations at the time - the National Paint, Oil and Varnish Association and the American Paint and Varnish Manufacturers' Association - to create a single professional association aiming to represent the paint, varnish, and oil industries.

In the 1950s, the NPVLA released a short film called The House in the Middle, which claimed to show how a freshly painted house might survive an atomic bomb.

In 1971, the NPVLA was renamed to the National Paint and Coatings Association (NPCA).

In 2009, the NPCA merged with the Federation of Societies for Coatings Technologies to create a single organization, which in 2010 was renamed the American Coatings Association.

== Activities ==
The ACA organizes the American Coatings Show in partnership with Vincentz Network, a conference for the paint and coatings industry held in Indianapolis every two years. The ACA also created the PaintCare paint recovery organization.

== Publications ==
- CoatingsTech
- Journal of Coatings Technology and Research
