= Journal of Coatings Technology and Research =

- Discipline: Materials science, chemistry
- Language: English
- Edited by: Mark Nichols

Publication details
- Former name(s): JCT Research
- History: 2004–present
- Publisher: Springer Science+Business Media on behalf of the American Coatings Association and the Oil and Colour Chemists' Association
- Frequency: Bimonthly
- Impact factor: 2.339 (2021)

Standard abbreviations
- ISO 4: J. Coat. Technol. Res.

Indexing
- CODEN: JRCEB5
- ISSN: 1547-0091 (print); 1935-3804 (web)
- LCCN: 2003215614
- OCLC no.: 53149714

Links
- Journal homepage

The Journal of Coatings Technology and Research is a bimonthly peer-reviewed scientific journal. It is owned by the American Coatings Association and published on their behalf by Springer Science+Business Media. The editor-in-chief of the journal is Dr. Mark Nichols (Ford Motor Company).

== Scope ==
Areas of research covered in the Journal of Coatings Technology and Research include the manufacture of functional, protective and decorative coatings including paints, inks and related coatings and their raw materials. The journal publishes research papers describing chemistry, physics, materials science, and engineering studies relevant to surface coatings; Applications papers on experimental solutions for technological problems in the design, formulation, manufacture, application, use and performance of surface coatings; review articles offering broad, critical overviews of advances in coatings science; and brief communications, presenting notes and letters on research topics of limited scope or immediate impact.

== Abstracting and indexing ==
The journal is abstracted and indexed in:

- Advanced Polymers Abstracts
- Aerospace and High Technology Database
- Aluminum Industry Abstracts
- Ceramic Abstracts - World Ceramics Abstracts
- Compendex
- Computer and Information Systems Abstracts
- Copper Data Center Database
- Engineering Research Database
- Current Contents/Engineering, Computing and Technology
- Engineered Materials Abstracts
- Materials Science Citation Index
- METADEX
- Science Citation Index
- Scopus
