= Portland Basin (geology) =

The Portland Basin is a roughly 770-square-mile (2,000 km^{2}) topographic and structural depression in the central Puget-Willamette Lowland. The Portland Basin is approximately 40 miles (64 km) long and 20 miles (32 km) wide, with its long axis oriented northwest. Studies indicate that as much as 1,800 feet (550 m) of late Miocene and younger sediments have accumulated in the deepest part of the basin near Vancouver. Most of the basin-fill material was carried in from the east by the Columbia River.
