= Jacob Zimmerman House =

Historic house in Oregon, United States

- U.S. National Register of Historic Places
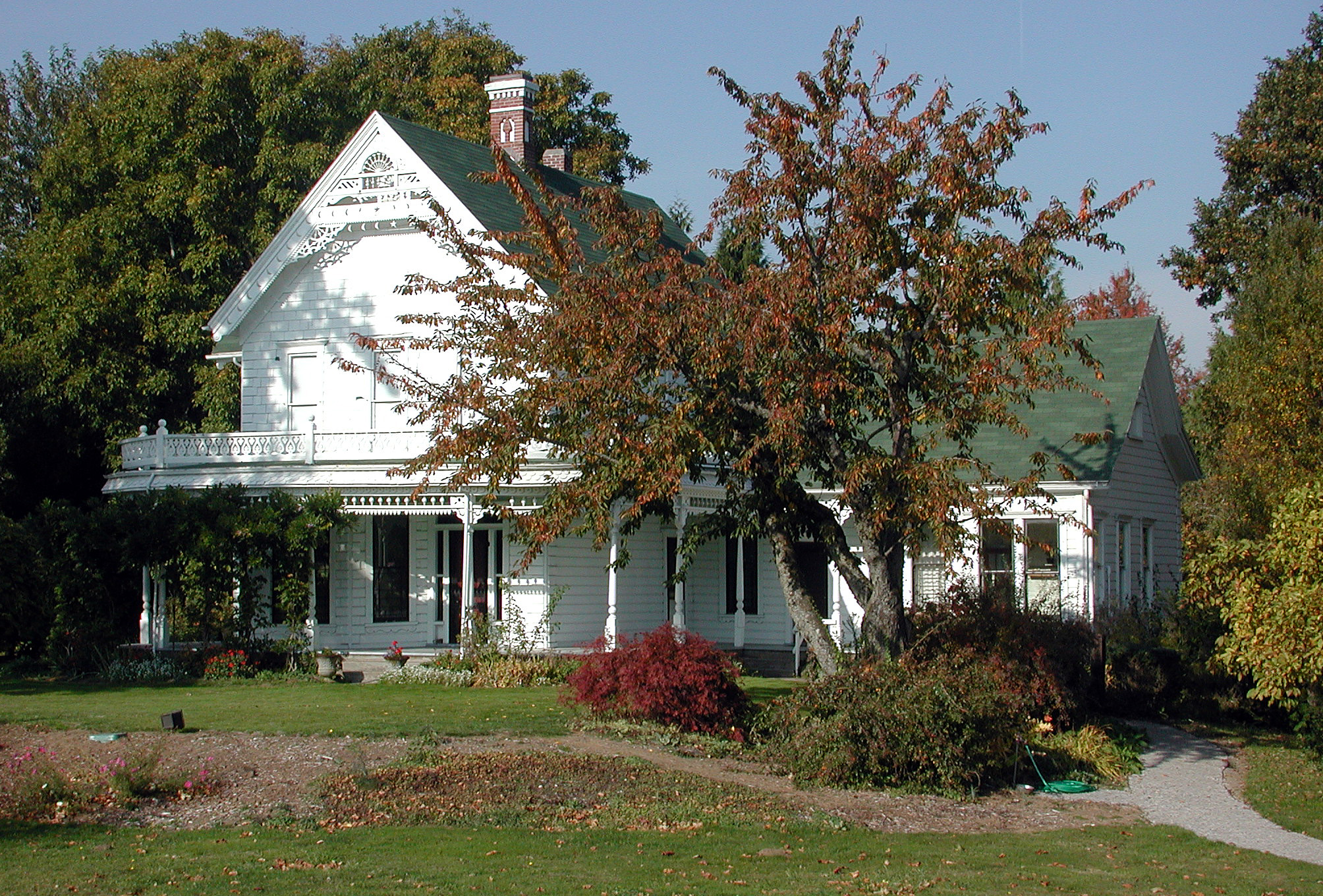
- The Zimmerman House in 2008

- Location within Oregon Location within the United States
- Location: 17111 NE Sandy Boulevard, Gresham, Oregon
- Coordinates: 45°32′55″N 122°29′14″W
- Area: 1.58 acres (6,400 m^{2})
- Built: 1874
- Architectural style: Queen Anne
- NRHP reference No.: 86001226
- Added to NRHP: June 5, 1986

Jacob Zimmerman House was the home of Jacob and Lena Zimmerman, German American settlers who came west over the Oregon Trail in 1851 to what became Multnomah County in the U.S. state of Oregon. Built in 1874, the house was part of a 600-acre (240 ha) dairy farm. Members of the Zimmerman family lived on the farm from 1870 through 1992. The house and 1.58 acres (6,400 m^{2}) were added to the National Register of Historic Places in 1986. In 1994, the city of Gresham began land acquisition and planning for a 5.98-acre (2.42 ha) public park, Zimmerman Heritage Farm, with the house as its centerpiece.

The city, which owns the land, and the Fairview-Rockwood-Wilkes Historical Society (FRWHS), which owns the house, manage the Zimmerman Heritage Farm through a partnership. In 1992, the FRWHS acquired the house from Isobel Faith Zimmerman, the youngest granddaughter of the original owners. By late 2006, the society had spent an estimated $170,000 on rebuilding the foundation, upgrading the security system, fixing the porch, repairing the chimneys, replacing the roof and gutters, painting the exterior, and other work. The house is open for public tours on the third Saturday of each month from 10 a.m. to 3 p.m.

The Zimmermans were among the five founding families of Fairview. They arrived in the Willamette Valley in 1851 and settled on Hayden Island in the Columbia River. After floods destroyed their first crops, they re-located to a 320-acre (130 ha) donation land claim about 10 miles (16 km) east of Portland. In late 1869, Jacob Zimmerman bought another donation land claim and moved into a log cabin on this site until building the original house in 1874. The Zimmermans' son, George, enlarged the farm to 660 acres (270 ha) on which he ran a successful dairy business that continued under several relatives and lessees into the 20th century.
