= Rodda Paint =

American paint company

- Type: Division
- Founded: 1932
- Headquarters: Portland, Oregon, USA
- Products: Paint
- Website: roddapaint.com

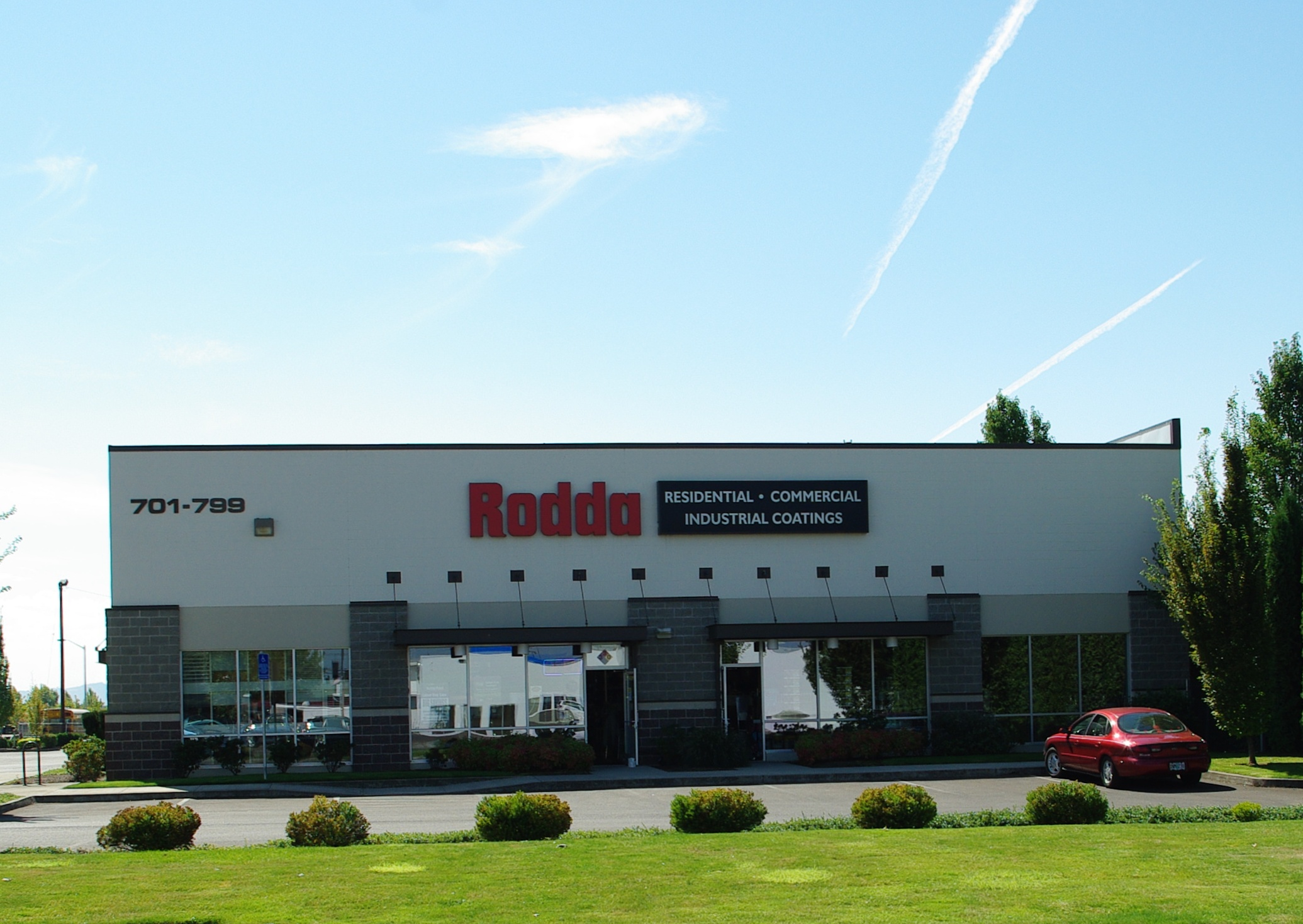
A Rodda store in Hillsboro, Oregon

The Rodda-Miller Paint Company was founded in 1932 by Arthur Rodda in Portland, Oregon. Rodda is the largest family-owned, regional paint company in the Pacific Northwest. Based in Portland, the company owns and operates 60 commercial and retail stores throughout Oregon, Washington, Alaska, Idaho, and Montana.

== History ==
In August 2004, Rodda Paint Co. was acquired by Cloverdale Paint, Inc., in Surrey, British Columbia. At the time, Rodda had 41 retail stores. Rodda signed a deal with Devine Color in May 2013 in which Rodda would distribute Devine's zero-VOC paint line. The merged operation operates under the Rodda name in the United States and under the Cloverdale name in Canada. The company bought five Kelly-Moore Paints branded stores in July 2014, to increase the number of stores to 53. Rodda then purchased Miller Paint, also based in Portland, in December 2024.
