= Metro (Oregon regional government) =

Regional government in Oregon, U.S.

Agency overview
- Formed: 1993
- Preceding agencies: Metropolitan Service District (1979–1992); Columbia Region Association of Governments (1966–1978); Metropolitan Service District (1957–1966)
- Type: Regional Special-purpose district and Metropolitan planning organization
- Jurisdiction: Portland metropolitan area
- Headquarters: Portland, Oregon
- Employees: 1,600
- Annual budget: $1.857 billion (2025-26 fiscal year)
- Agency executives: Juan Carlos González, Council President; Brian Evans, Auditor; Marissa Madrigal, Chief Operating Officer
- Website: oregonmetro.gov

Metro is the regional government for the Portland metropolitan area in the U.S. state of Oregon, covering portions of Clackamas, Multnomah, and Washington counties. It is the only directly elected regional government and metropolitan planning organization in the United States. Metro is responsible for overseeing the Portland region's solid waste system, general planning of land use and transportation, maintaining certain regional parks and natural areas, and operating the Oregon Zoo, Oregon Convention Center, Portland's Centers for the Arts, and the Portland Expo Center. It also distributes money from two voter-approved tax measures: one for homeless services and one for affordable housing.

== History and evolution ==
Metro in its current form evolved from Columbia Region Association of Governments (CRAG) (1966–1978) and a predecessor Metropolitan Service District (MSD) (1957–1966). Measure 6, a 1978 statewide ballot measure established Metro, effective January 1, 1979. In 1992 voters approved a home-rule charter that identified Metro's primary mission as planning and policy making to preserve and enhance the quality of life and the environment, and changed the agency's name to Metro. This charter was amended in November 2000 when Ballot Measure 26-10 was passed by voters, although the principal changes did not take effect until January 2003. The measure eliminated the Executive Office and reorganized executive staff. The position of Executive Officer, elected by voters, was merged with that of council presiding officer, chosen annually by fellow Metro councilors, creating the position of Metro Council President. Metro's first president was David Bragdon, who served in the office from January 2003 until September 2010.

Metro's scope has grown over time. It took over Glendoveer Golf Course, regional parks, pioneer cemeteries and the Expo Center from Multnomah County in 1994, and the City of Portland transferred management of its performing arts venues in 1989.

In 2020, Metro placed a measure on the May ballot intended to raise $250 million for homeless services. It was approved and was enacted in January 2021. Under it, individuals with earnings of over $125,000 annually and couples with earnings over $200,000 are subject to 1% marginal income tax. Businesses with a gross revenue over $5 million are also subject to a 1% business tax.

== Areas of responsibility ==
=== Planning ===
- Provides land use planning and is responsible for maintaining the Portland-area urban growth boundary, a legal boundary which separates urban from rural land, and is designed to reduce urban sprawl. It coordinates with the cities and counties in the area to ensure a 20-year supply of developable land.
- Serves as the metropolitan planning organization for the area, responsible for the planning of the region's transportation system. It is a separate organization from TriMet, which operates most of the region's buses and the MAX Light Rail system, although state statute provides authority for Metro to take over TriMet.
- Responsible for the region's geographic information system (GIS), maintains the Regional Land Information System (RLIS).

=== Parks, natural areas and cemeteries ===
- Manages more than 20,000 acres of natural areas and parks around the Portland region. This includes Blue Lake Regional Park, Chehalem Ridge Nature Park, Cooper Mountain Nature Park, Graham Oaks Nature Park, Oxbow Regional Park, Howell Territorial Park, Glendoveer golf course, the Sauvie Island and M. James Gleason Memorial Boat Ramps, Chinook Landing Marine Park and the Smith and Bybee Wetlands Natural Area.
- Maintains 14 pioneer cemeteries, including Grand Army of the Republic Cemetery, Lone Fir Cemetery, Gresham Pioneer Cemetery and Multnomah Park Cemetery.

=== Garbage and recycling ===
- Manages a closed landfill, St. Johns Landfill, and owns two public garbage, hazardous waste and recycling transfer stations in the region. Metro also has responsibility for the ultimate disposal of the region's solid waste and regulates private transfer stations.
- Staffs a regional Recycling Information Center as well as does education about solid waste
- Runs the Regional Illegal Dumping, or RID, Patrol which cleans up illegal dumping on public property, such as furniture, hazardous waste and construction debris.

=== Venues ===
- Operates the Oregon Convention Center, Oregon Zoo, Portland Expo Center and, on behalf of the city of Portland, Portland's Centers for the Arts.

=== Housing ===
- As of 2018, oversees a $652.8 million regional bond for affordable housing.
- Distributes money from a regional measure for homelessness services

== Jurisdiction, leadership ==
Metro serves 24 cities, including Portland, in Clackamas, Multnomah, and Washington counties in Oregon, as well as unincorporated parts of those counties. The Metro Council consists of a president and six councilors, all directly elected by their districts, and nonpartisan. The incumbent president was Lynn Peterson, who assumed office January 7, 2019, until she resigned effective March 13, 2026, to become Lake Oswego's interim city manager.

Deputy council president Duncan Hwang then temporarily presided over meetings. After the primary election for the next terms two months later, the council appointed the winners of the races, Juan Carlos González and Mike Palacios, to also finish the current terms for council president and the district he formerly served.

According to the 2020 census, the average district population for the districts used from 2011 to 2021 was 248,362 and the current population of the old districts is as follows (the populations for the newly drawn districts are yet to be determined):

District	Includes (as of 2020)	2020 Population for 2011-21 districts	Current councilor
1	Boring, Damascus Fairview, Gresham, a portion of eastern Happy Valley, portions of East Portland, Troutdale, Wood Village	255,353	Ashton Simpson
2	Unincorporated parts of Clackamas County and Stafford, Dunthorpe, Gladstone, most of Happy Valley, Johnson City, Lake Oswego, Milwaukie, Oregon City, a portion of Southwest Portland, Rivergrove, and West Linn	278,609	Christine Lewis
3	Most of Beaverton, some of West Slope and Raleigh Hills, and all of Bull Mountain, Durham, Garden Home–Whitford, King City, Metzger, Sherwood, Tigard, Tualatin and Wilsonville	283,198	Gerritt Rosenthal
4	Northern Washington County, communities of Aloha, northwest portion of Beaverton, all of Bonny Slope, Cedar Hills, Cornelius, Forest Grove, and Hillsboro, most of Bethany and Cedar Mill, and some of Raleigh Hills and West Slope	297,578	Mike Palacios
5	All of N and NW Portland, portions of NE, SE S, and SW Portland (including downtown), Maywood Park, and parts of Washington County, including West Haven-Sylvan and small portions of Bethany and Cedar Mill	278,302	Mary Nolan
6	Portions of S, SW, SE and NE Portland, Raleigh Hills, and West Slope	278,727	Duncan Hwang
Total		1,671,767	

Metro's adopted 2025-26 budget is $1.857 billion, with the equivalent of 1,129 full-time employees.

== Regional plan ==
Metro is also the Portland regional planning organization and develops a regional master plan to coordinate future development. Metro's master plan for the region includes transit-oriented development: this approach, part of the new urbanism, promotes mixed-use and high-density development around light rail stops and transit centers, and the investment of the metropolitan area's share of federal tax dollars into multiple modes of transportation. Metro's master plan also includes multiple town centers, smaller versions of the city center, scattered throughout the metropolitan area.

In 1995 Metro introduced the 2040 plan as a way to define long term growth planning. The 2040 Growth Concept is designed to accommodate 780,000 additional people and 350,000 jobs by 2040. This plan has created some criticism from environmentalists, but few consider it a threat to Portland's legacy of urban growth management.

An April 2004 study in the Journal of the American Planning Association tried to quantify the effects of Metro's plans on Portland's urban form. While the report cautioned against finding a direct link between any one policy and a specific improvement in Portland's urban form, it showed strong correlation between Metro's 2040 plan and various west-side changes in Portland. Changes cited include increased density and mixed-use development as well as improved pedestrian/non-automobile accessibility.

== See also ==
- Clatsop Butte, East Buttes
- Mike Burton, a former head of Metro
- PaintCare and MetroPaint, paint recycling efforts involving Metro
- Regional Arts & Culture Council, partially funded by Metro
- Springwater Trail, a trail partially managed by Metro
