= Miller Paint =

American paint company

- Company type: Private
- Founded: 1890; 136 years ago
- Founder: Ernest Carl Bernard Mueller
- Headquarters: Portland, Oregon, US
- Key people: Jason Palumbis (CEO and President)
- Products: Paint
- Website: millerpaint.com

The Miller Paint Company is an employee-owned paint manufacturing company headquartered in Portland, Oregon. The company has more than 50 stores in Oregon, Washington, and Idaho.

== History ==
Miller Paint was founded in 1890 by Ernest Carl Bernard Mueller, a muralist and house painter who emigrated from Germany to Portland, Oregon. After changing the spelling of his last name to Miller, he began doing business as Ernest Miller & Co., and established a storefront in downtown Portland in 1895.

Ernest Miller died in 1937 and was succeeded by his son Walt, who served as CEO and President until 2000. In 2020, Jason Palumbis became the company's fourth CEO, succeeding Steve Dearborn. Miller was acquired by Portland based Rodda Paint in December 2024.
