= Clatsop Butte =

Upland butte in Portland, Oregon, U.S.

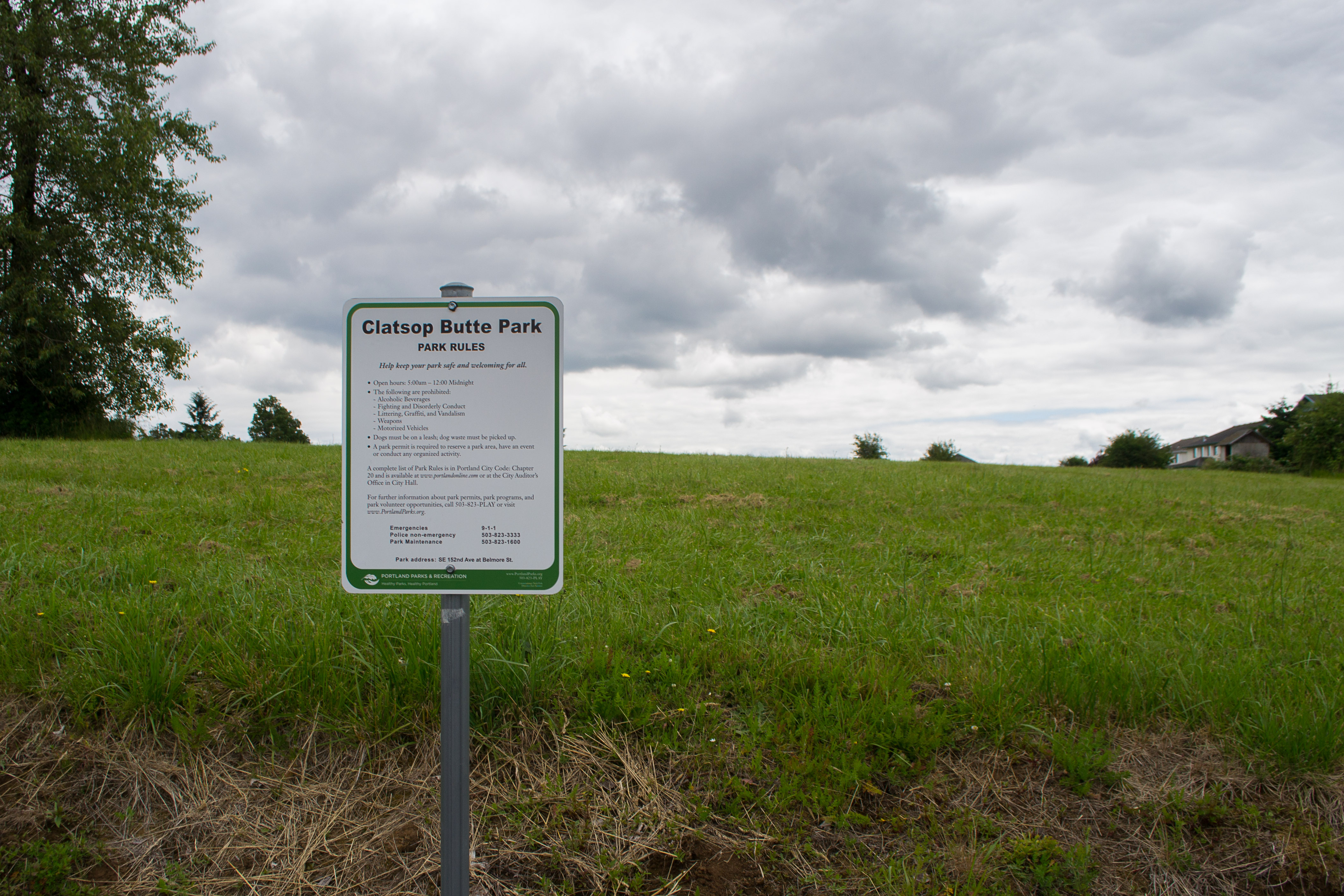
- Clatsop Butte from SE 152nd Avenue at Evergreen

Highest point
- Elevation: 577 ft (176 m)
- Coordinates: 45°28′22″N 122°30′22″W

Geography
- Location within Oregon
- Location: Portland, Oregon

Geology
- Mountain type: Cinder cone
- Volcanic field: Boring Lava Field
- Last eruption: 300,000-500,000 years ago

Clatsop Butte is an upland butte lying directly south of Powell Butte in southeast Portland, Oregon, United States. Clatsop Butte City Park, which occupies part of the butte, is at coordinates 45°28′28″N 122°30′24″W at an elevation of 577 feet (176 m). Johnson Creek, Southeast Foster Road, and the Springwater Corridor Trail pass between Powell Butte and Clatsop Butte near Southeast 152nd Avenue.

The City of Portland acquired about 16 acres (6.5 ha) of land on the butte for a park and natural area in 2000. Other land acquisitions increased the park's size to 102 acres (0.41 km^{2}) by 2007 but led to controversy about public expenditures. A 16-member oversight committee was to review the purchases in 2008 to decide whether the money had been wisely spent.

As of 2008, Metro the regional government in the Oregon part of the Portland metropolitan area, included 49 acres (20 ha) of the acreage on its list of protected natural areas. The natural area, comprising densely forested hillsides and creek frontage, supports wildlife including deer, foxes, coyotes, northern flickers, pileated woodpeckers and other local and migratory birds.
