= PaintCare =

American organization handling waste paint

- Formation: October 2009
- Founded at: Oregon
- Type: Non-profit 501(c)(3)
- Website: www.paintcare.org

PaintCare, Inc. is a non-profit 501(c)(3) product stewardship organization initially created by the American Coatings Association, intended to handle waste paint in states that have passed paint stewardship laws. According to one source, paint "is one of the most common items people dispose of incorrectly." PaintCare establishes drop-off locations where the public can dispose of leftover paint for recycling, re-use, or other appropriate management. It is headquartered in Washington, D.C. PaintCare programs are funded by a fee on the sale of each container of paint sold in the state or jurisdiction.

== Uses of recovered paint ==
In the case of the Oregon program, as of 2013, recovered paint was used in a number of ways: incineration for power production, additive material for cement, and production of recycled paint for re-sale. In the case of the Minnesota program, as of 2016, recovered paint was generally recycled into new paint, used in the preparation of materials used to cover landfills, or incinerated for power production.

== History ==
PaintCare was formed to manage the first U.S. paint stewardship program that began in Oregon in July 2010. During its first year, the cost per gallon of paint incurred by PaintCare was $7.03. The program was slated to sunset in 2014, but this was rescinded by legislation.

Since 2010, the program has also been established in eleven additional states and the District of Columbia: California, Colorado, Connecticut (established July 2013), Illinois, Maine, Maryland, Minnesota (established July 2015), New York, Rhode Island, Vermont and Washington.

In February 2024, PaintCare and the American Coatings Association together petitioned the EPA to classify paints and related materials as Universal Waste, thereby subjecting handlers, transporters, importers and receivers of materials to EPA standards as described in 40 CFR Part 273.
