= Sellwood =

Sellwood may refer to:

- Sellwood, Portland, Oregon, a Portland neighborhood
- Sellwood Bridge, a bridge in Portland
- Sellwood Park, a park in southeast Portland
- Sellwood Riverfront Park, a park in southeast Portland
- Sellwood Branch YMCA, a structure listed on the National Register of Historic Places
- Sellwood, Ontario, a village

== People with the surname ==
- Joe Sellwood (1911–2007), Australian rules footballer
- John Sellwood (died 1892), Oregon pioneer
- Neville Sellwood (1922−1962), Australian jockey

== See also ==
- Selwood (disambiguation)
