= Butterfly Park =

Public park in Portland, Oregon, U.S.

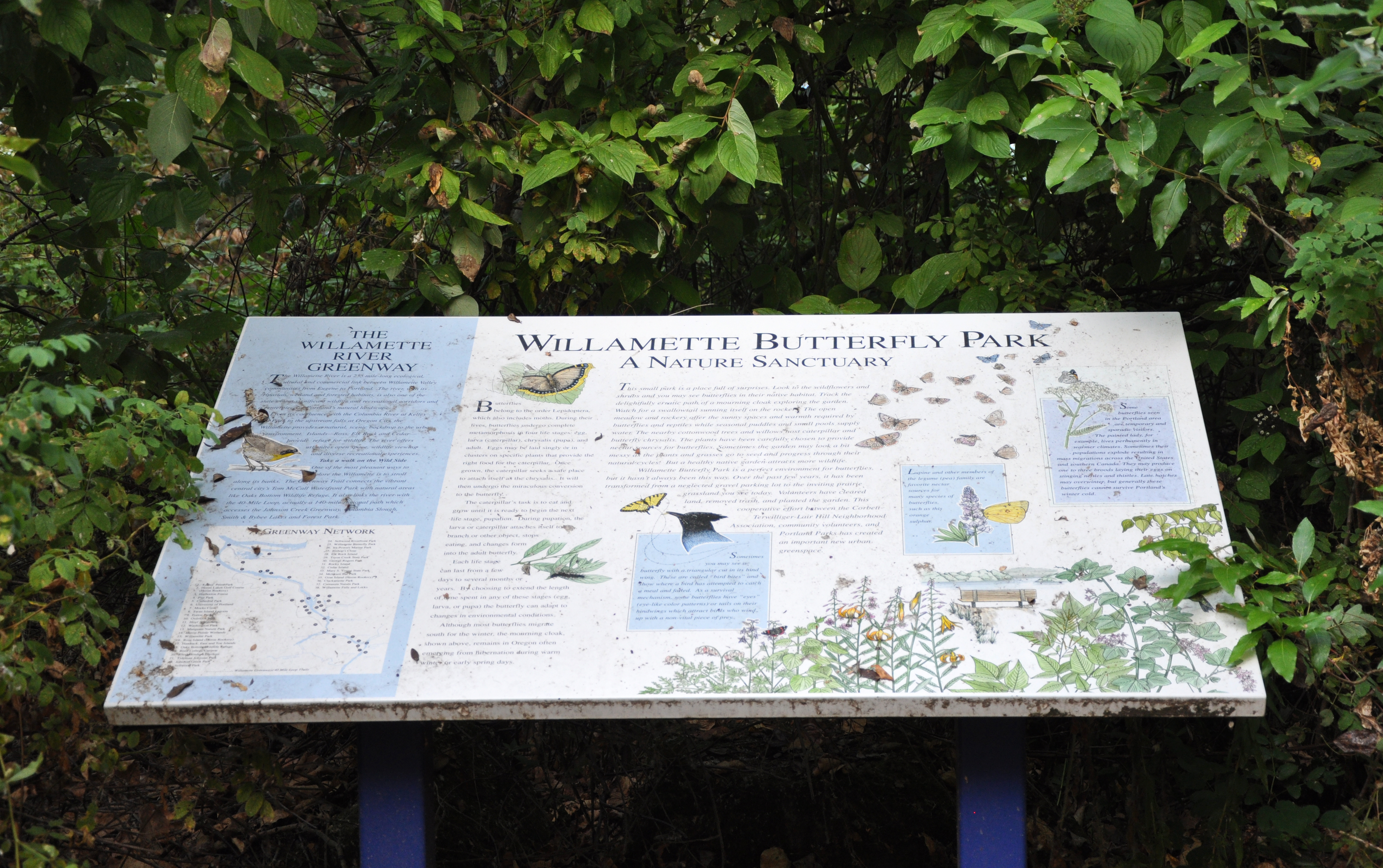
- Interpretive sign at park, 2010
- Interactive map of Butterfly Park
- Type: Urban park
- Location: 7720 SW Macadam Ave. Portland, Oregon, U.S.
- Coordinates: 45°28′09″N 122°40′15″W
- Area: 1.07 acres (0.43 ha)
- Created: 1996
- Operator: Portland Parks & Recreation

Butterfly Park is a city park of about 1 acre (0.4 ha) in Portland, in the U.S. state of Oregon. Located at 7720 South Macadam Avenue, the park includes a natural area and walking paths near the Willamette River. The natural area provides important habitat for butterflies, including mourning cloaks and orange sulphurs.

The Greenway Trail, part of the 40-Mile Loop, links Butterfly Park to Miles Place and Willamette Park on the north as well as the Willamette Moorage Natural Area, the Sellwood Bridge, and Powers Marine Park, all on the south. Slightly south of Butterfly Park, Stephens Creek empties into the Willamette. Oaks Amusement Park and Sellwood Riverfront Park are on the river's east bank, opposite Butterfly Park.

At the park entrance, a rock garden near an interpretive sign features columbines, penstemon, fireweed, and other flowering plants. Vegetation in the park, once dominated by Himalayan blackberries, includes native grasses, wildflowers, and dogwood. Cedar waxwings, killdeer, orioles, chickadees, and other birds frequent the park. A bench along the trail offers views of Ross Island and other spots along the river.

It took about 10 years to organize and develop the park, formerly a "derelict patch of land" near the Macadam Bay Club, a residential houseboat community. The South Portland Neighborhood Association worked with Portland Parks & Recreation to complete the work. The park is "one of the region's smallest, but most biologically productive" greenspaces.

== See also ==
- List of parks in Portland, Oregon
