= Willamette Park =

Public park in Portland, Oregon, U.S.

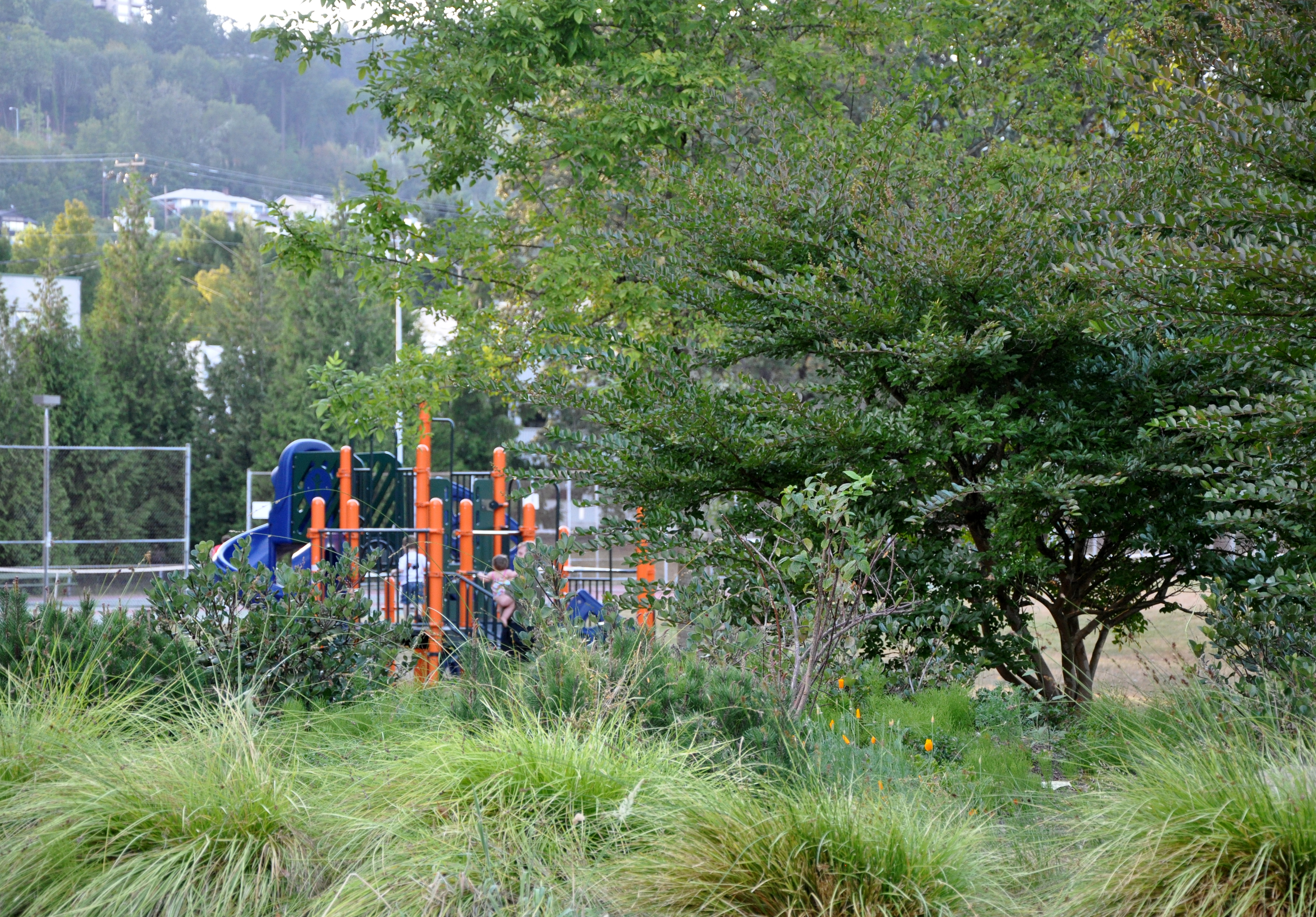
- Vegetation, playground, and tennis court, 2010
- Interactive map of Willamette Park
- Type: Urban park
- Location: SW Macadam Ave. and Nebraska St. Portland, Oregon
- Coordinates: 45°28′27″N 122°40′08″W
- Area: 26.26 acres (10.63 ha)
- Created: 1929
- Operator: Portland Parks & Recreation
- Status: Open 5 a.m. to 10 p.m.

Willamette Park is a city park of about 26 acres (11 ha) in south Portland, in the U.S. state of Oregon. Located at Southwest Macadam Avenue and Nebraska Street, the park includes a boat dock and ramp, paved and unpaved paths, picnic areas, restrooms, a dog off-leash area, playground, soccer field, and tennis courts.

== Description and history ==
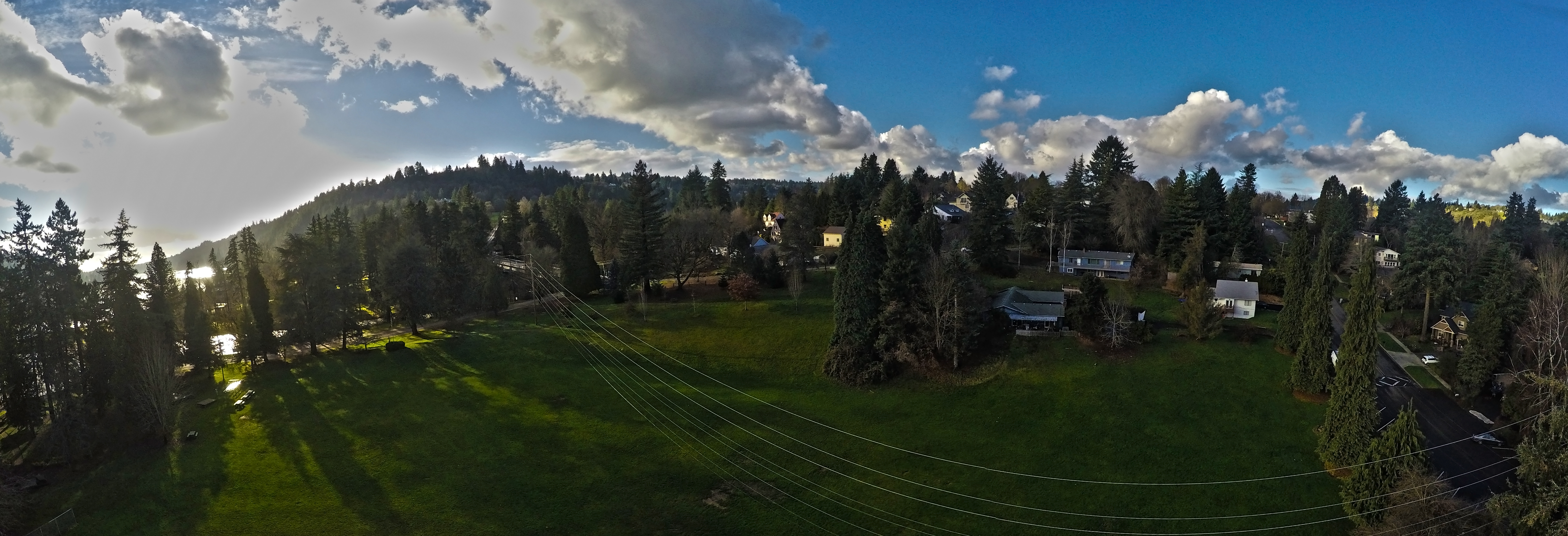
Willamette Park aerial view

The northern part of Willamette Park was formerly the site of the Portland Shipbuilding Company, which the City of Portland purchased in 1969 in order to expand the park.

Bordering the Willamette River, Willamette Park offers views of Ross Island and its companions, Hardtack, East, and Toe. The Willamette Greenway Trail, part of Portland's 40-Mile Loop, passes north–south through the park, linking it to downtown Portland on the north and Miles Place, Butterfly Park, Stephens Creek, Willamette Moorage Natural Area, the Sellwood Bridge, and Powers Marine Park, all on the south. Oaks Amusement Park and, further south, Sellwood Riverfront Park, are along the east bank, opposite Willamette Park. From the north end of the park, it is possible to see great blue heron and bald eagle nests on Ross Island and the nests of osprey and Canada geese on the tops of transmission towers at Oaks Bottom Wildlife Refuge, beyond the east bank of the river.

Purple martins nest in white gourds attached to a pole near the boat ramp. The gourds, which other birds do not like, protect a small number of martins from losing their homes to sparrows and starlings. Other birds seen at the park include gulls, sandpipers, cormorants, kingfishers, and swallows. Beavers frequent the area. A plaque at the south end of the park honors an Oregon white oak, "one of the largest" along the Greenway.

As part of the South Portland Riverbanks Projects, the city began removing non-native plants from the south end of Willamette Park in 2006. Volunteers organized by Friends of Trees subsequently replaced them with 250 native trees and shrubs.
