= Stephens Creek (Oregon) =

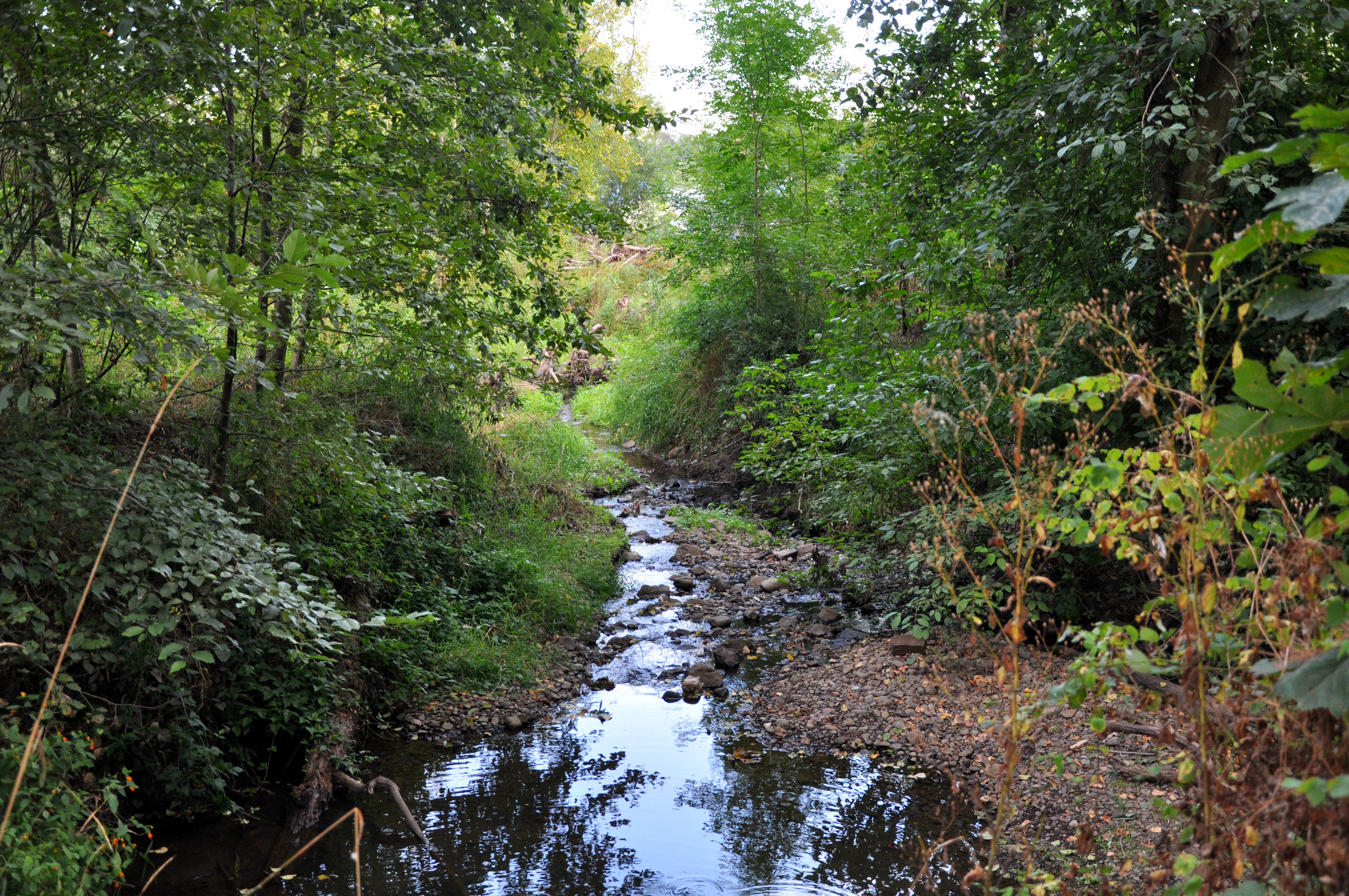
- Stephens Creek near Butterfly Park

- Location of the mouth of Stephens Creek in Oregon
- Etymology: Thomas Stephens, whose donation land claim included the lower reaches of the creek

Location
- Country: United States
- State: Oregon
- County: Multnomah

Physical characteristics
- Source: Tualatin Mountains (West Hills)
  - location: Portland, Oregon
  - coordinates: 45°28′29″N 122°42′03″W
  - elevation: 467 ft (142 m)
- Mouth: Willamette River
  - location: Portland, Oregon
  - coordinates: 45°28′08″N 122°40′06″W
  - elevation: 11 ft (3.4 m)
- Length: 2 mi (3.2 km)
- Basin size: 1.2 sq mi (3.1 km^{2})

Stephens Creek, a 2-mile (3 km) tributary of the Willamette River, flows entirely within the city of Portland in the U.S. state of Oregon. Beginning in the neighborhood of Hillsdale, it runs generally east through residential and commercial neighborhoods as well as patches of forest and parkland to join the Willamette slightly north of the Sellwood Bridge. Its course passes under Interstate 5 and down the canyon followed by Southwest Taylors Ferry Road. Stephens Creek enters the river at Willamette Moorage Park, which is part of a 35-acre (14 ha) group of natural areas called the South Portland Riverbank. The natural areas include Butterfly Park and Willamette Park as well as the moorage park and other public land parcels.

Stephens Creek Nature Park, a 3.38-acre (1.37 ha) protected area at Southwest Bertha Boulevard and Chestnut Street, is near the creek's headwaters. It provides open space and a plant and animal refuge in an urban setting. Downstream, the Portland Bureau of Environmental Services and its partners completed work in 2008 to improve habitat for endangered fish species such as Chinook salmon that frequent the creek near its mouth.

The Stephens Creek headwaters project was completed in 2007. Through an innovative pilot project called Green Streets, the headwaters basin of Stephens Creek was improved through the use of bioswales, which are specially engineered ditches on the side of the street, receive rain flowing off the asphalt. Rocks and native plants slow the water down. Water is directed to a wetland area acquired as part of the project. This allows rain to seep underground, cleans the water of contaminants, and moderates the water flows in the creek. This was a joint project between the local neighborhood residences and the City of Portland.

== See also ==
- List of rivers of Oregon
