= Selwood =

Selwood may refer to:

== Places ==
- Selwood, Ontario a former community in Greater Sudbury in Ontario in Canada
- Selwood Forest in southwest England
- Selwood, Somerset in southwest England

== People with the surname ==
- Adam Selwood (1984–2025), Australian rules footballer
- Brad Selwood (born 1948), Canadian hockey defenceman
- Joel Selwood (born 1988), Australian rules footballer
- Scott Selwood (born 1990), Australian rules footballer
- Steven Selwood (born 1979), English cricketer
- Troy Selwood (1984–2025), Australian rules footballer

== See also ==
- Sowood, West Yorkshire, England
- Sowood Capital, a Boston based hedge fund
- Sellwood (disambiguation)
