= Sherry Ross (pioneer) =

American pioneer, farmer and merchant

- Born: February 11, 1824; Wayne County, Indiana
- Died: January 4, 1867 (aged 42); Santa Clara, California
- Occupations: Farmer, merchant
- Known for: Ross Island; Ross Island Bridge
- Spouse: Rebecca Deardorff

Sherry Ross (February 11, 1824 – January 4, 1867) was an Oregon pioneer and the namesake of Ross Island and Ross Island Bridge in Portland, Oregon.

Ross arrived in the Oregon Country in 1845, part of a train of 200 wagons that branched off of the Oregon Trail via the Meek Cutoff. Ross filed a provisional land claim in 1846 on a parcel of roughly 400 acres surrounded by the Willamette River, a location later known as Ross Island.

In 1851 Ross married Rebecca Deardorff, an 1850 immigrant to the Oregon Territory.

Ross operated a dairy farm on Ross Island and was listed as a livery stable owner at 165 First Street in early Portland.

== See also ==
- History of Portland, Oregon
