= Sellwood Riverfront Park =

Public park in Portland, Oregon, U.S.

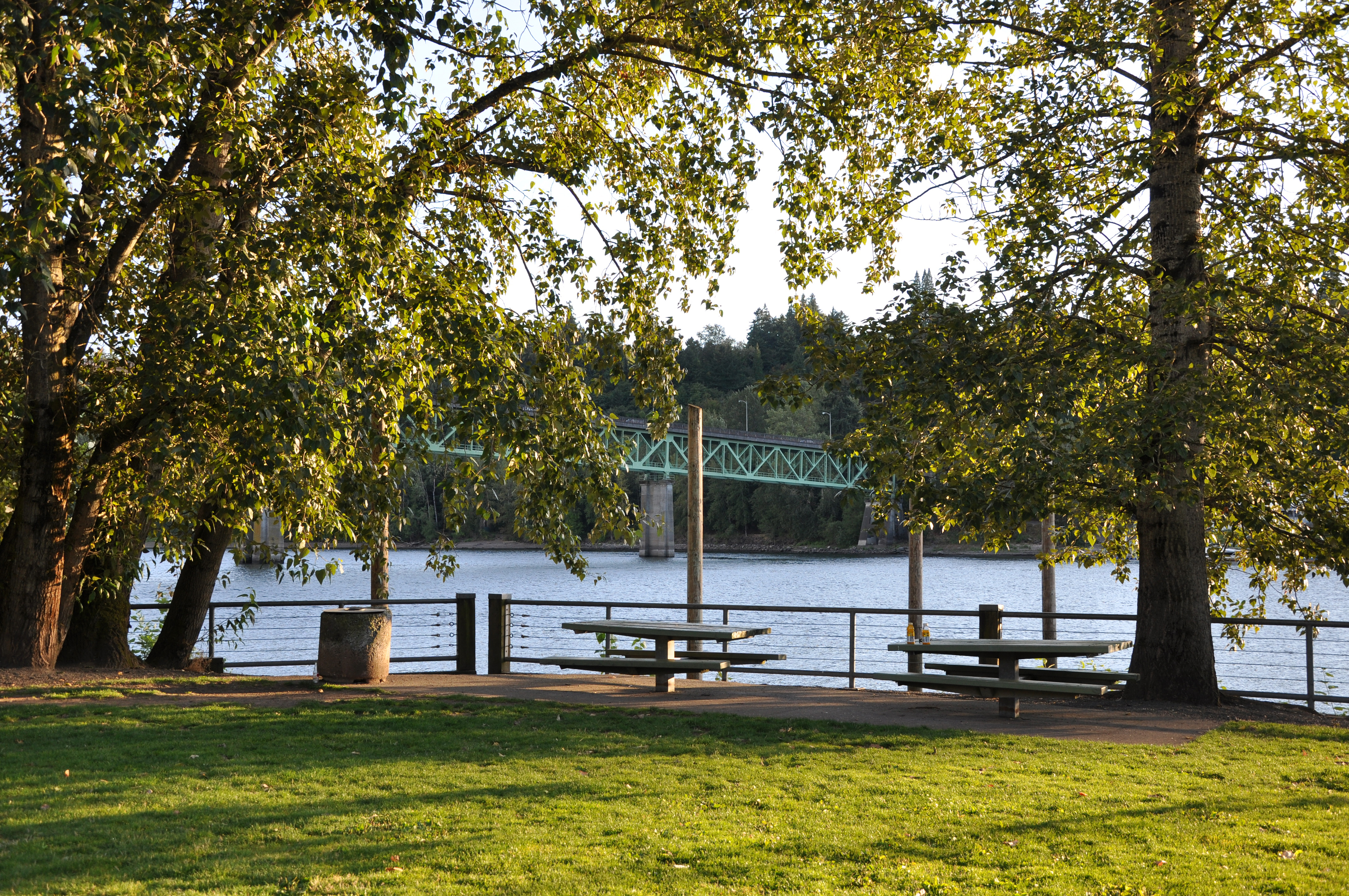
- View from the park of the Willamette River and the old Sellwood Bridge, 2010
- Interactive map of Sellwood Riverfront Park
- Type: Urban park
- Location: SE Spokane St. and Oaks Pkwy. Portland, Oregon
- Coordinates: 45°28′05″N 122°39′52″W
- Area: 8.17 acres (3.31 ha)
- Created: 1969
- Operator: Portland Parks & Recreation
- Status: Open 5 a.m. to midnight

Sellwood Riverfront Park is a city park of about 7.6 acres (3.1 ha) in southeast Portland, in the U.S. state of Oregon. Located at Southeast Spokane Street and Oaks Parkway, the park has paths, picnic tables, a stage, a boat dock on the Willamette River, restrooms, and a dog off-leash area.

== Description and history ==
Formerly a mill site overgrown with Himalayan blackberries, the south half of the park includes a parking lot, the boat launches, and a large grassy area suitable for picnics and lawn games. The north end of the park is a native-plant wetland and riparian zone featuring marsh plants and willows. A formal path winds through the wetland, home to frogs and dragonflies, and an informal path follows the river bank toward Oaks Amusement Park to the north. Running parallel to Oaks Parkway along the east side of the park is the Springwater Corridor, a hiking and biking trail linking the park to Oaks Bottom Wildlife Refuge and downtown Portland, as well as the amusement park. Directly east of the park on the far side of the Springwater Corridor is Sellwood Park. The Macadam Bay Club is across the river from the park, and slightly north of the club lies Butterfly Park.

Portland Parks & Recreation arranges free, sponsored, public concerts in the park during the summer. Performances in 2010, all held on Monday evenings, consisted of four separate concerts, one apiece devoted to soul music, gospel and rhythm and blues (R&B), alternative pop, and rock.
