= Ross Island Bridge =

Bridge in Portland, Oregon

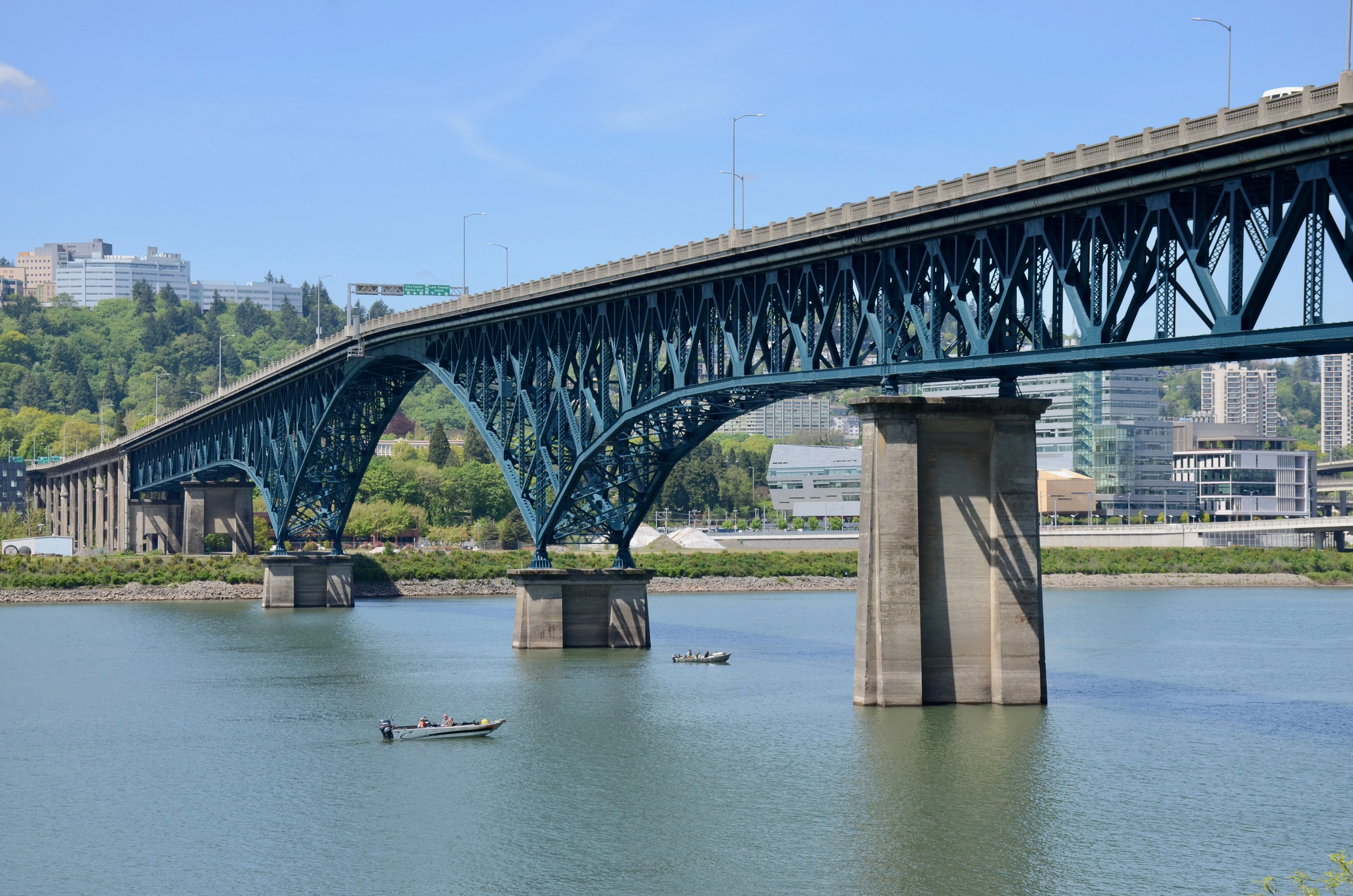
- Viewed from the southeast in 2019, after repainting
- Coordinates: 45.50121°N 122.66454°W
- Carries: US 26
- Crosses: Willamette River
- Locale: Portland, Oregon
- Official name: Ross Island Bridge
- Maintained by: ODOT

Characteristics
- Design: Cantilever deck truss
- Total length: 3,729 feet (1,137 m)
- Longest span: 535 feet (163 m)
- Clearance below: 120 feet (37 m)

History
- Opened: December 21, 1926

Location
- Interactive map of Ross Island Bridge

The Ross Island Bridge is a cantilever truss bridge that spans the Willamette River in Portland, Oregon. It carries U.S. Route 26 (Mount Hood Highway) across the river between southwest and southeast Portland. The bridge opened in 1926 and was designed by Gustav Lindenthal and honors Oregon pioneer Sherry Ross. It is named for its proximity to Ross Island. Although it looks like a deck arch bridge, it is a cantilever deck truss bridge, a rare type in Oregon.

== History and description ==
The bridge was part of the unprecedented period of bridge building in Portland during the 1920s. It was opened on December 21, 1926, and cost $2 million to construct. The bridge was designed by a famous engineer named Gustav Lindenthal.

The bridge is named for its location close to Ross Island, an island in the Willamette River which measures about one-and-a-half by one mile. The bridge is about 800 feet (240 m) north of the island and does not connect with, nor does it provide access to, Ross Island. There is a pedestrian walkway on the north side of the bridge, with no barrier between the sidewalk and the westbound right lane. The bridge originally had sidewalks on both sides, but the one on the south side was removed in 1958, to provide more space for vehicles.

A pedestrian underpass was built at SW Kelly Avenue and SW Naito Parkway in 1942 by the state of Oregon in conjunction with the Ross Island Bridge project.

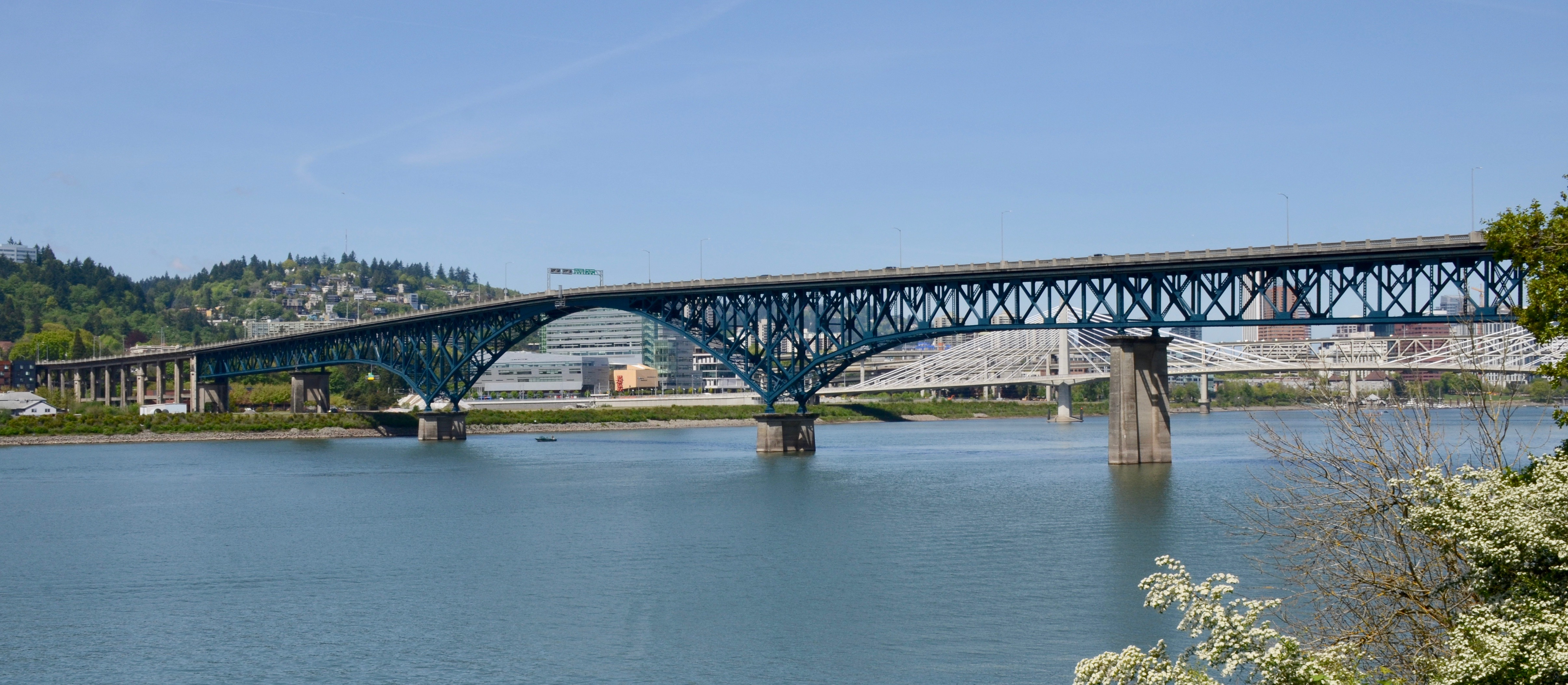
Viewed from the south-southeast, with the Tilikum Crossing visible in the background

The bridge's girders were originally painted black, but in 1955–56 they were repainted green. In 1961, Portland architect Lewis Crutcher suggested repainting all of Portland's downtown-area bridges from black into different colors, and the proposal also included changing the Ross Island Bridge's color to blue. The proposal was approved by the Multnomah County Commission, and repainting of the Ross Island Bridge was carried out in the summer of 1965. The bridge's color remains blue today, specifically "phthalo blue".

During the Great Depression, the bank of the Willamette near the Ross Island Bridge became the site of a Hooverville.

In 1976, ownership was transferred from Multnomah County to the Oregon Department of Transportation. In 2000–2001 the bridge underwent a $12.5 million renovation in which the deck was replaced, the railings were replaced and upgraded, and the drainage system and lighting were improved. During this renovation, lead paint was discovered, causing some delays and cost overruns.

In 2014, work began on a full repainting of the bridge, including removal of the old, lead-based paint and restoration of the bridge's blue color, which had faded since being applied, in 1965. The project was completed in early 2019.

== Approaches ==
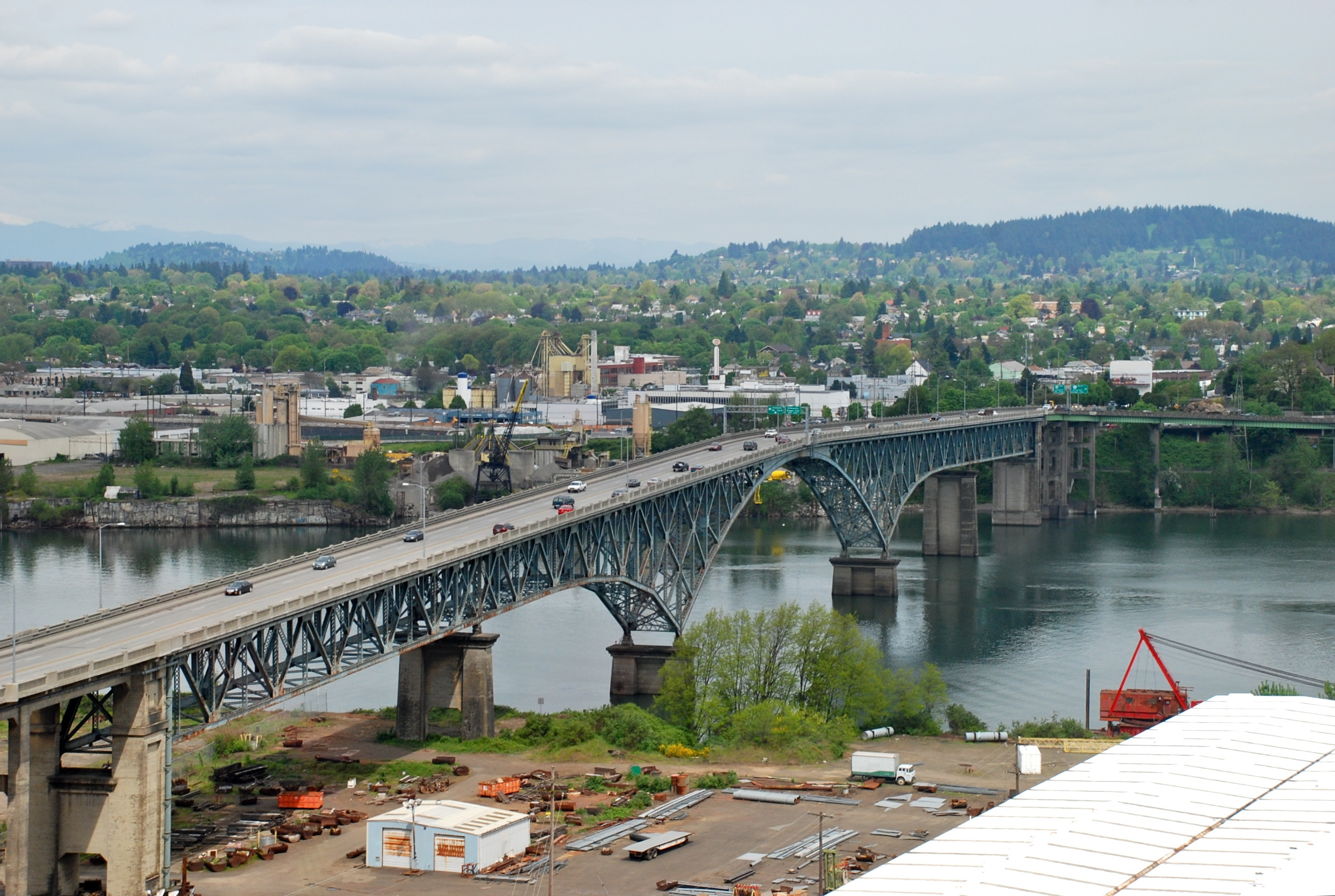
View of bridge from the southwest, from on board the Portland Aerial Tram in 2008, by which time the bridge's blue paint had become very faded

=== West approach ===
The west end of the bridge has a full interchange with Naito Parkway (Oregon Route 10, Pacific Highway West), as well as access to and from Arthur Street, which carries US 26 towards Interstate 405. (Until around 2005, US 26 went north on Naito Parkway and through the south side of downtown Portland.) Access is also provided to and from the north end of Oregon Route 43 (Macadam Avenue - Oswego Highway), which runs next to Interstate 5 as frontage roads, and allows for access to and from I-5 via slip ramps and U-turns.

The pedestrian walkway comes off the north side parallel to the ramp to Kelly Avenue (leading to Arthur Street), running to the intersection of Kelly Avenue and Porter Street.

=== East approach ===
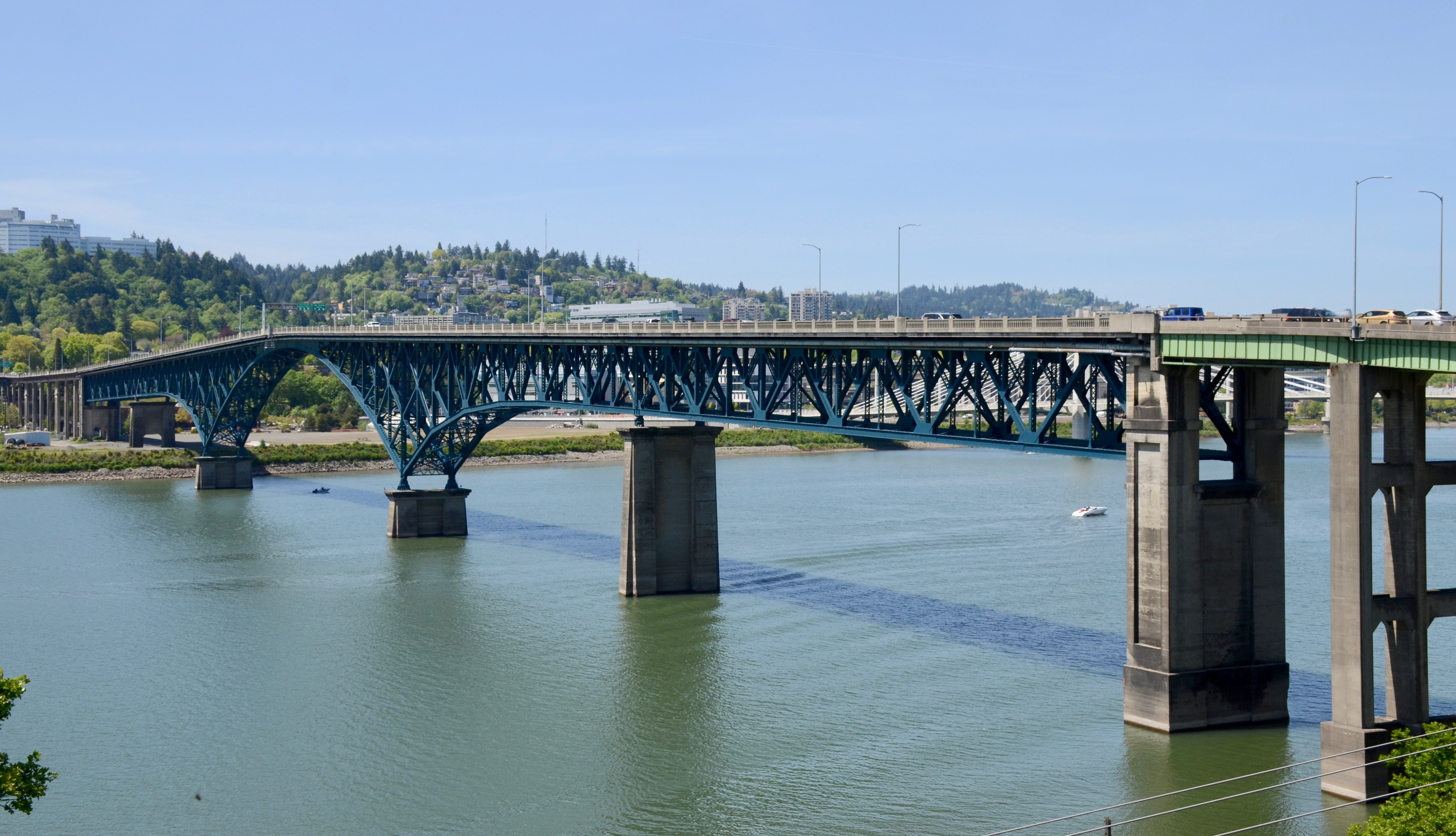
The bridge as seen from 99E

At the east end of the bridge, US 26 becomes Powell Boulevard as it passes over Oregon Route 99E (Pacific Highway East). Route 99E is a high-speed arterial road, built to near-freeway standards; just to the north it passes over a railroad on the twin Martin Luther King, Jr. Viaduct and Grand Avenue Viaduct. There is a direct ramp from US 26 east to Route 99E south, but no northbound access. Likewise, there is access from Route 99E north to the bridge (via Woodward Street and 8th Avenue), but traffic from Route 99E south must exit at Mill Street, about 0.5 miles (0.80 km) to the north, and head down Division Street, 11th Avenue and Milwaukie Avenue to US 26. This same movement is done to reach US 26 east; US 26 west however has direct access to Route 99E north via 9th Avenue and Woodward Street. A fourth direct ramp runs from Route 99E north to US 26 east.

The pedestrian walkway simply becomes the north sidewalk of Powell Boulevard, a major street.

== See also ==
- List of bridges documented by the Historic American Engineering Record in Oregon
- List of crossings of the Willamette River
- Transportation in Portland, Oregon#Bridges
