= Omega Morgan =

American industrial rigging company

- Type: Private
- Industry: Industrial rigging, machinery moving
- Founded: 1991; 35 years ago
- Headquarters: Hillsboro, Oregon, USA; 45.5559°N 122.92213°W
- Number of locations: 5
- Key people: Dick Ferchak, CEO
- Revenue: $60 million (2011)
- Number of employees: ~350 (2012)
- Website: omegamorgan.com

Omega Morgan is a privately held company headquartered in Hillsboro, Oregon. Founded in 1991, the 350-employee company specializes in heavy lifting, specialized transportation, machinery moving, crane and rigging services, plant relocations, equipment installations, millwrighting, and applied and industrial metrology.

== History ==
Morgan Industrial was founded in 1991 in North Plains, Oregon, by Joe Morgan, where the company served customers, including aerospace manufacturer Boeing, at industrial manufacturing sites around the Portland area. The company merged with machinery moving specialists, Omega Rigging, based in Tacoma, Washington, in 2003.

Jeff Morgan became the company’s CEO in 2004. The company announced in 2010 they would add an additional 150 employees during construction of Intel’s D1X facility, on top of the 100 employees already working on projects for Intel. In 2011, the company renamed itself as Omega Morgan. In 2011, the company added offices in Fife, Washington and Calgary, Canada along with the headquarters in Hillsboro.

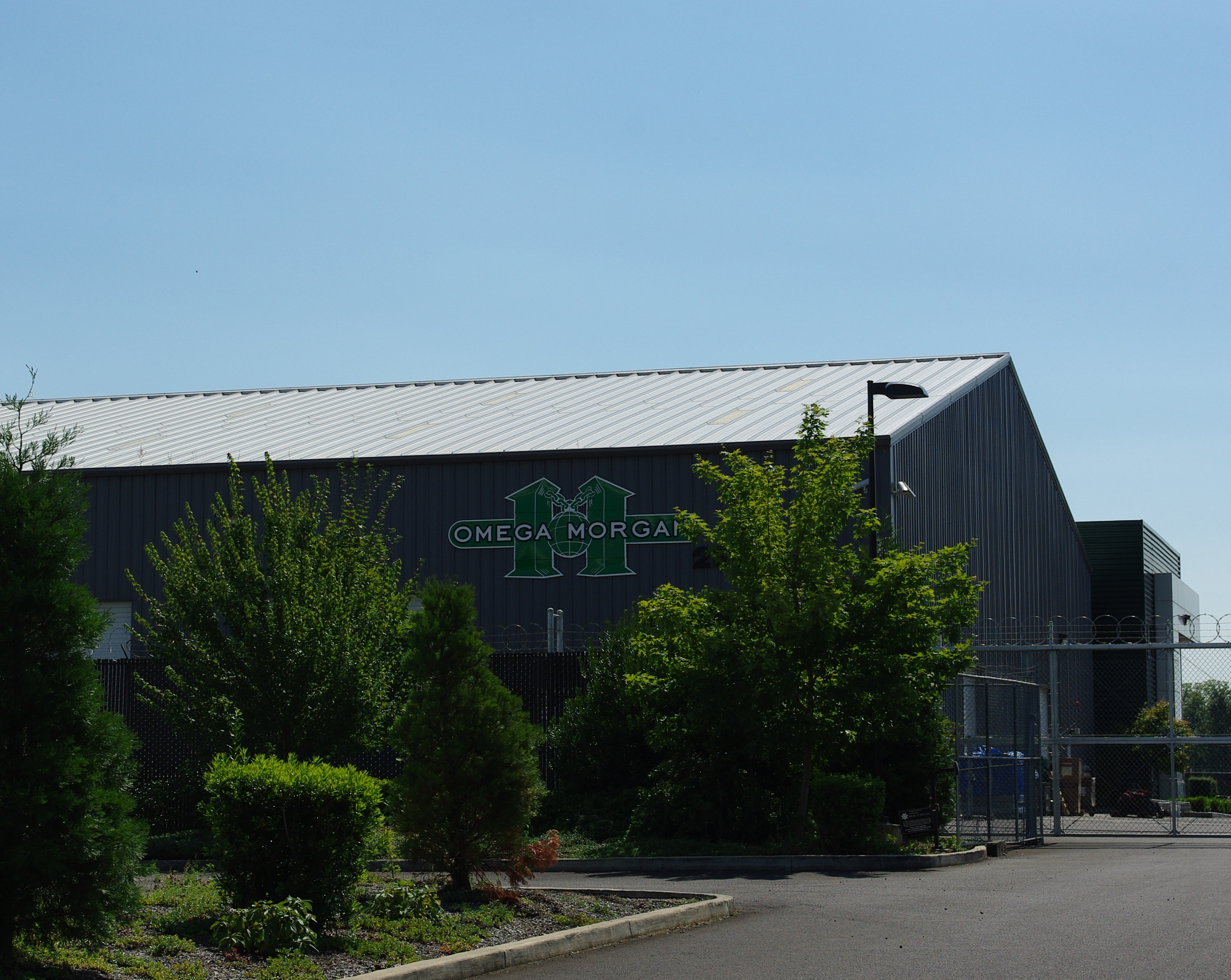
Omega Morgan headquarters - Hillsboro, Oregon

John McCalla became the company's CEO in December 2011, replacing Jeff Morgan. At that time, Riverlake Partners had taken majority ownership of the company for an undisclosed amount.

In November 2016, Omega Morgan and Sarens LLC, a worldwide provider of heavy lifting and engineered transportation, began a joint venture to provide crane services in the Pacific Northwest. The joint venture, operating as Omega Morgan Crane Services, allowed the company to provide dedicated and expanded cane services to Portland, Oregon, Seattle, Washington and the surrounding areas.

Dick Ferchak became Omega Morgan’s CEO in October, 2017. In addition to offices in Hillsboro, Fife, and Calgary, the company opened locations in Houston, TX and Mukilteo, WA in 2020, and a location in Boise, ID in 2021.

The company also made several acquisitions in late 2020 and early 2021, including the acquisition of Morley Machine Tool Alignment, which expanded the Omega Morgan service portfolio to include industrial and applied metrology services. The company also acquired full control of its shares in its three-year crane services joint venture with Sarens LLC.

In 2023 Omega Morgan acquired Intermountain Rigging and Heavy Haul, a Salt-Lake city based heavy haulage company which in a result increased its geographical presence and fleet size.

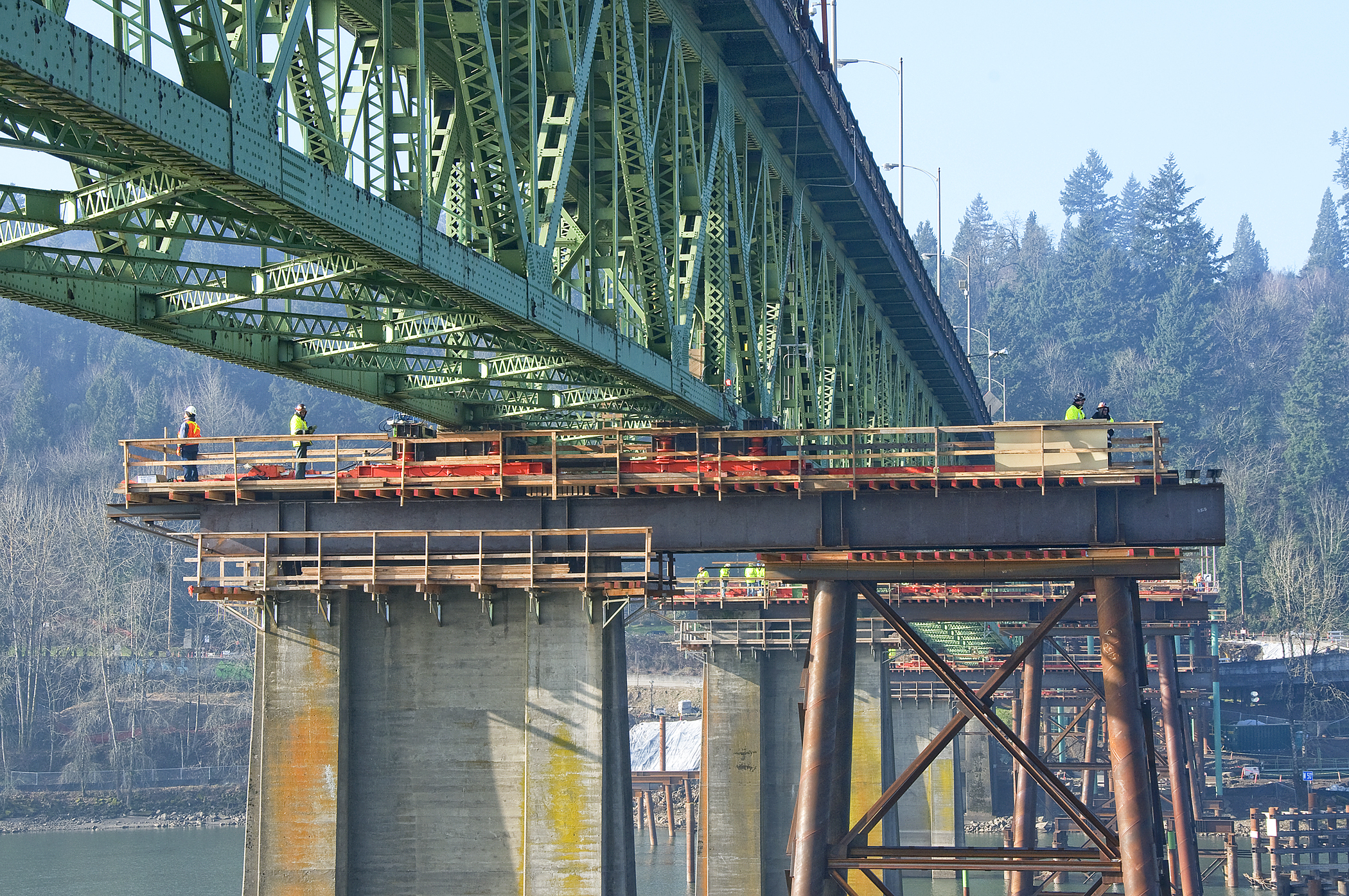
Move of the Sellwood Bridge

== Notable moves ==
=== Canby Ferry ===
Omega Morgan hauled the Canby Ferry to Portland in April 2012 due to the closure of the Willamette Falls Locks.

=== Sellwood Bridge ===
In January 2013, working with Multnomah County government, Omega Morgan moved the 6.8-million pound main 1,100-foot (340 m) section of the Sellwood Bridge in Portland, Oregon from its current location onto new pylons. This move was part of the construction project to replace the bridge. The move allowed for the old bridge section to be used as a detour route while the new bridge was constructed adjacent to the old span. Omega Morgan used jacks and skids to move the section, as well as Dawn dish-washing detergent as a lubricant. To match the newly built onramps, the bridge was moved 66 feet on its west end and 33 feet on its east end. The moved bridge, known as a shoofly bridge, served as a temporary span until the new crossing was completed in 2016.

=== Skagit River Bridge ===
In August 2013, the company began hauling oversized loads to the Canadian tar sands. While the route through Idaho was approved by Idaho's Department of Transportation, environmental groups and tribal leaders protested part of the Idaho portion of the route on U.S. Route 12 that crossed tribal lands and traveled along the Clearwater River. The protests slowed the load, but the shipment later arrived in Montana. In September 2013, they moved the replacement span into place as part of the repairs to the Skagit River bridge in Washington.

=== 2+U Project with Skanska ===
In 2019, Omega Morgan’s specialized transportation division and Omega Morgan Crane Services assisted Skanska with a complex project in downtown Seattle, transporting and setting 20 precast tapered concrete columns, each weighing between 69,000 and 165,000 pounds. The project required the acquisition of 39 permits and authorizations to account for heavy traffic conditions in the area, noise restrictions, and road closures. The location was also between steep hills, power lines, trolley lines, and underground vaults, requiring months of planning for proper crane placement and safe transportation of the concrete columns. Due to the complicated nature of the project, Omega Morgan’s crews performed several rounds of modeling and testing before moving forward to execute the plan.

=== Wind Turbine Components ===
In late 2020 into early 2021, Omega Morgan partnered with several transportation and logistics companies to create a groundbreaking method for transporting 72 wind turbine components from the Port of Longview and the Port of Tacoma in Washington State, up to a site in Alberta, Canada. This innovative method bypassed land transportation along heavily congested routes in Oregon and Washington by barging components from Washington ports through to the Port of Lewiston, and then on to Alberta, Canada. It was the first project of its kind to be completed in the Pacific Northwest.

== Awards ==
- Intel Top Safety Award, Platinum Designation 2011
- Specialized Carriers and Rigging Association Rigging Job of the Year 2013
- Bechtel Supply Chain Award 2019
- Specialized Carriers and Rigging Association Hauling Job of the Year 2019
