= Sowood Capital =

American hedge fund

Sowood Capital is a Boston-based hedge fund that lost 50% of its capital in the credit market turmoil of July 2007. Jeffrey Larson, the founder, worked for 12 years at the Harvard Management Company, the organization responsible for managing some of the business affairs of Harvard University. Harvard had seeded Larson with $500 million. Losses from the collapse were about $1.5 billion. Chicago-based hedge fund Citadel LLC bought out Sowood's position and made huge profits as the markets recovered.

One reporter wrote Sowood Capital "lost roughly half of its $3 billion in capital in less than a month, becoming the first high-profile victim (sic) of the credit market crisis".

== Bibliography ==
- Strasburg, Jenny, Burton, Katherine (31 July 2007). "Sowood Funds Lose More Than 50% as Debt Markets Fall (Update4)". Bloomberg. Archived from the original on 16 March 2013. Retrieved 15 April 2022.
- Citadel scoops up Sowood Capital. Financial Times. (subscription required)
