= Ross Island (Oregon) =

Island in Portland, Oregon, United States

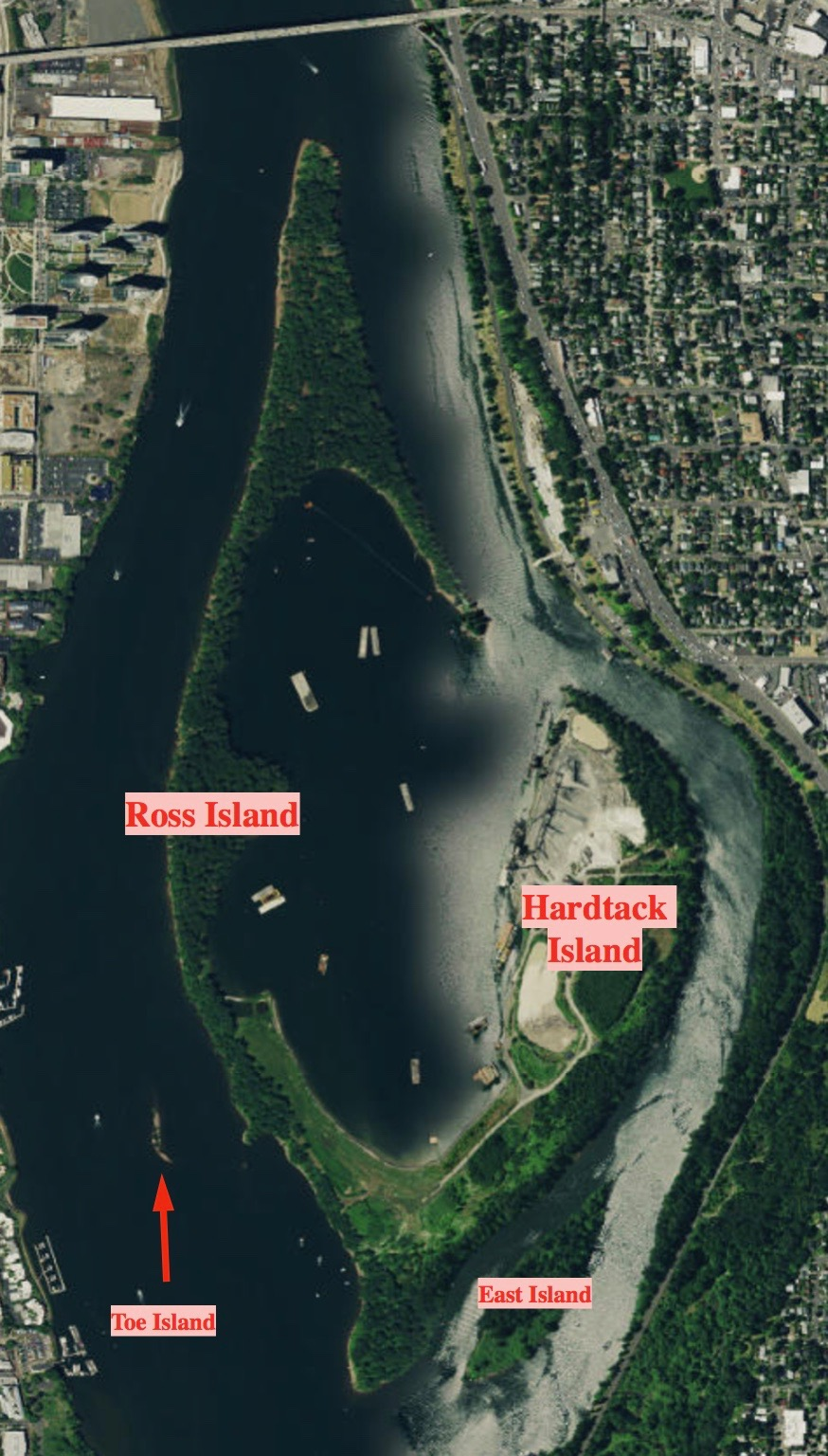
- Satellite image of Ross Island, with each of the four islands labeled.
- Interactive map of Ross Island

Geography
- Location: Willamette River RM 14.1–15.7 in Portland, Oregon
- Coordinates: 45.490°N 122.667°W
- Total islands: 4
- Major islands: 2
- Area: 0.625 sq mi (1.62 km^{2})
- Length: 1.40 mi (2.25 km)
- Width: 0.37 mi (0.6 km)
- Highest elevation: 20 ft (6 m)

Administration
- United States

Demographics
- Population: 0 (2008)
- Pop. density: 0/sq mi (0/km^{2})

Additional information
- approximately two-thirds of the island has been excavated

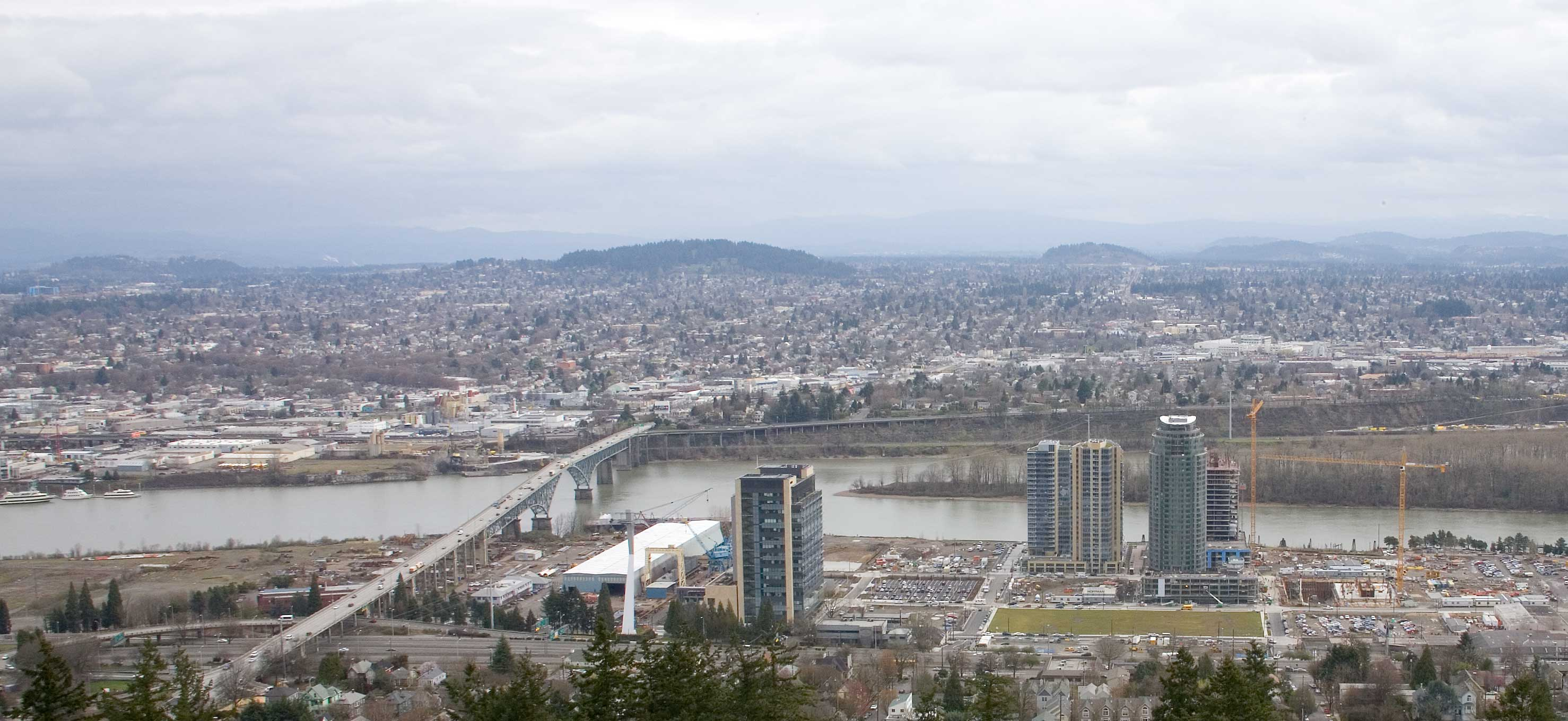
The downstream tip of Ross Island seems to point toward the Ross Island Bridge near Portland's South Waterfront.

Ross Island is the main island of a four-island cluster in the Willamette River in Portland, Oregon, in the United States. The islands, covering a total of about 400 acres (160 ha), are owned mainly by Ross Island Sand and Gravel (RISG), which mined them extensively between 1926 and 2001. The other three islands are Hardtack, East, and Toe. Ross Island was named for Oregon pioneer Sherry Ross.

The islands separate Holgate Slough on the east from the main channel of the Willamette on west. They are about 1 mile (1.6 km) south of downtown Portland at river mile 15. The islands are slightly upriver (south) of the Ross Island Bridge between the Springwater Corridor Trail on the eastern shore and the South Waterfront on the western shore and slightly downriver from the Oaks Bottom Wildlife Refuge on the eastern shore and Willamette Park on the western shore. Ross is the longest of the islands, the closest to the western shore, and the closest to the Ross Island Bridge. Hardtack is to its east. East Island lies southeast of Hardtack, and Toe Island lies southwest of Ross. No bridge reaches the islands, which are approached only by boat.

Ross Island is connected to Hardtack Island by an artificial levee built in 1926 by the U.S. Army Corps of Engineers in order to form a lagoon between the two islands. The lagoon made dredging easier for RISG and diverted water west of the islands, where it deepened a shipping channel.

In 2007, the owner of RISG, Robert B. Pamplin, Jr., donated 45 acres (18 ha) of the island to the city of Portland, which plans to manage the property as a natural area. The islands, which retain remnants of forested riparian zones, are used by at least 50 species of birds including ospreys, eagles, and herons. The gift was accepted long after transfer negotiations stalled in 2002 over questions of liability for the islands' restoration and cleanup. Because it contains toxic fill dirt, the Ross-Hardtack lagoon is listed for cleanup by the Oregon Department of Environmental Quality. City staff and outside experts who inspected the 45 acres (18 ha) in 2007 approved of their condition. The Port of Portland donated the land it owned on the northern tip of the island to the city in 2015.
