= Oaks Bottom Wildlife Refuge =

Public park and wildlife refuge in Portland, Oregon, U.S.

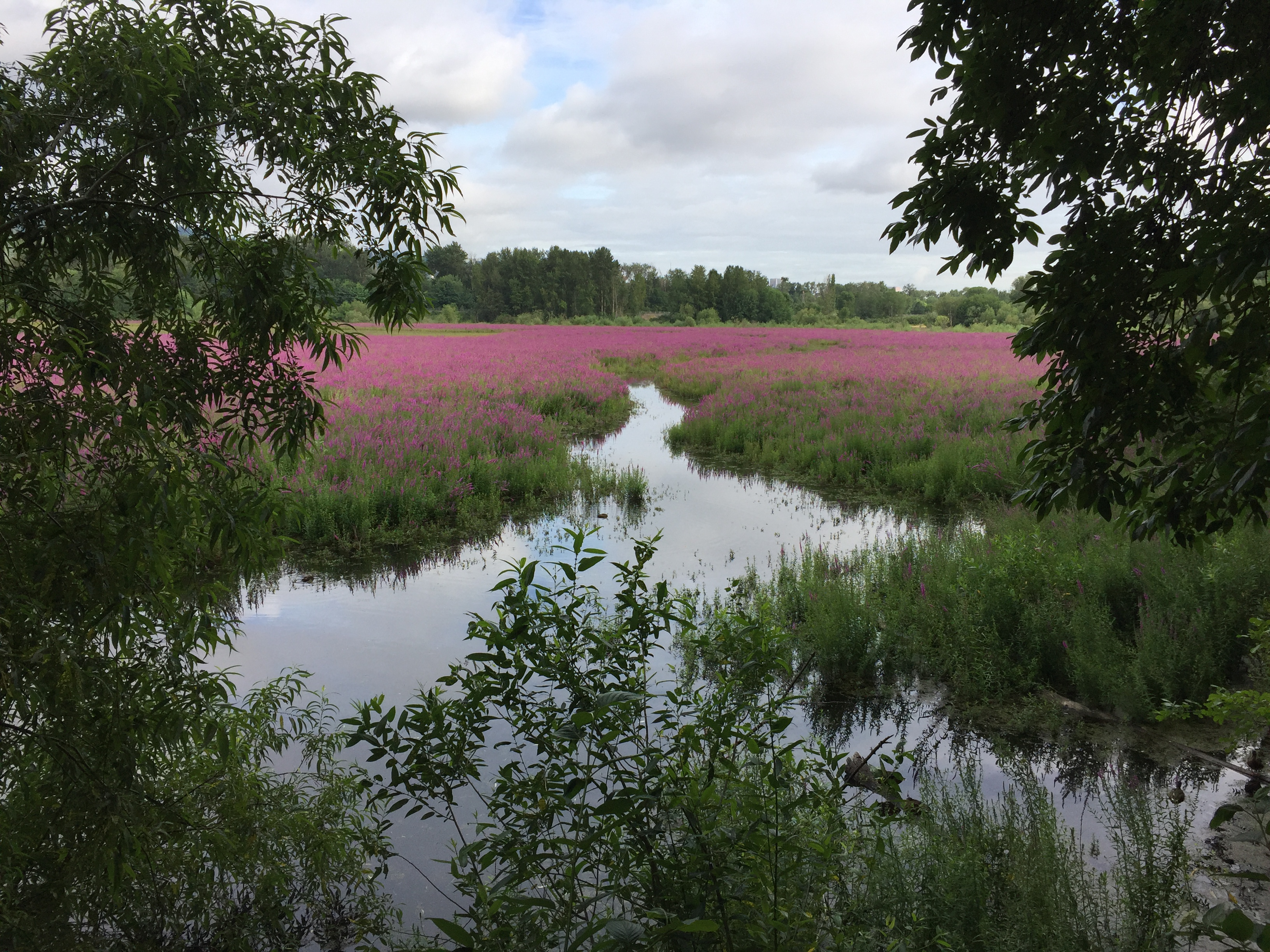
- Oaks Bottom wetland in summer
- Interactive map of Oaks Bottom Wildlife Refuge
- Type: Urban park
- Location: SE 7th Ave. and Sellwood Blvd. Portland, Oregon
- Coordinates: 45°28′13″N 122°39′34″W
- Area: 161.58 acres (65.39 ha)
- Created: 1959
- Operator: Portland Parks & Recreation
- Status: Open 5 a.m. to midnight; north parking lot closes at 10 p.m.

Oaks Bottom Wildlife Refuge is a city park of about 141 acres (57 ha) in southeast Portland, in the U.S. state of Oregon. Located in a floodplain along the east bank of the Willamette River near Sellwood, the park is known for attracting a wide variety of birds. In 1988, the park was named Portland's first wildlife refuge, and in 2004, it was designated the city's first migratory bird park.

== Description ==
The elongated park includes a shallow seasonal lake and wetland, open grassy areas, and mixed maple and oak woodlands, among other habitats. A hiking and biking path called the Springwater Corridor runs through the park parallel to the Willamette River. The corridor runs alongside the Oregon Pacific Railway tracks which can be seen on a berm next to the path. Slightly south of the refuge are Sellwood Park and Sellwood Riverfront Park. Oaks Amusement Park is to the west, near the river. To the east, the top of a bluff above the lake is mainly residential, though one of the buildings is a mausoleum and crematorium with a huge great blue heron mural (Portland Memorial Mausoleum Mural ) overlooking the wetlands. A 1-mile (1.6 km) hiking trail wraps around the east side of the lake beneath the bluff. A side trail connects the east trail with Sellwood Park. To the north are mixed woodlands, shrubs, and a few open fields, and a trail crossing the north section of the refuge links the Corridor to a parking lot at the top of the bluff. West of the north part of the refuge are two islands, East and Hardtack, that belong to the Ross Island group in the Willamette. Ross Island is the site of a heron rookery.

== History ==
Before the Bottom became a park, the raised bed of the rail line had largely separated the wetlands from the river. The south part of the wetlands had been altered by a sanitary landfill that the city acquired in 1969 to prevent its development as industrial land. The city later filled the north end of the park with debris from construction of Interstate 405 through downtown Portland. The plan in the early 1970s was to fill the rest of the wetlands and to use the space for museums, perhaps a motocross course, and a gondola lift to transport visitors from the top of the bluff to the park. Public pressure from the Audubon Society of Portland, the Sellwood-Moreland Improvement League, and The Nature Conservancy helped persuade the city to stop filling the wetlands. In 1988, after many years of debate, officials designated Oaks Bottom as the first urban wildlife refuge in Portland. Since then, Friends of Oaks Bottom, a volunteer group, has helped the city's parks department with trail maintenance, habitat restoration, and information services.

In 2004, the park was named the city's first migratory bird park. Portland was one of five cities to receive $50,000 grants from the US Fish and Wildlife Service to establish such parks. Thousands of migratory birds visit the refuge during their annual north–south flights.

== Flora and fauna ==
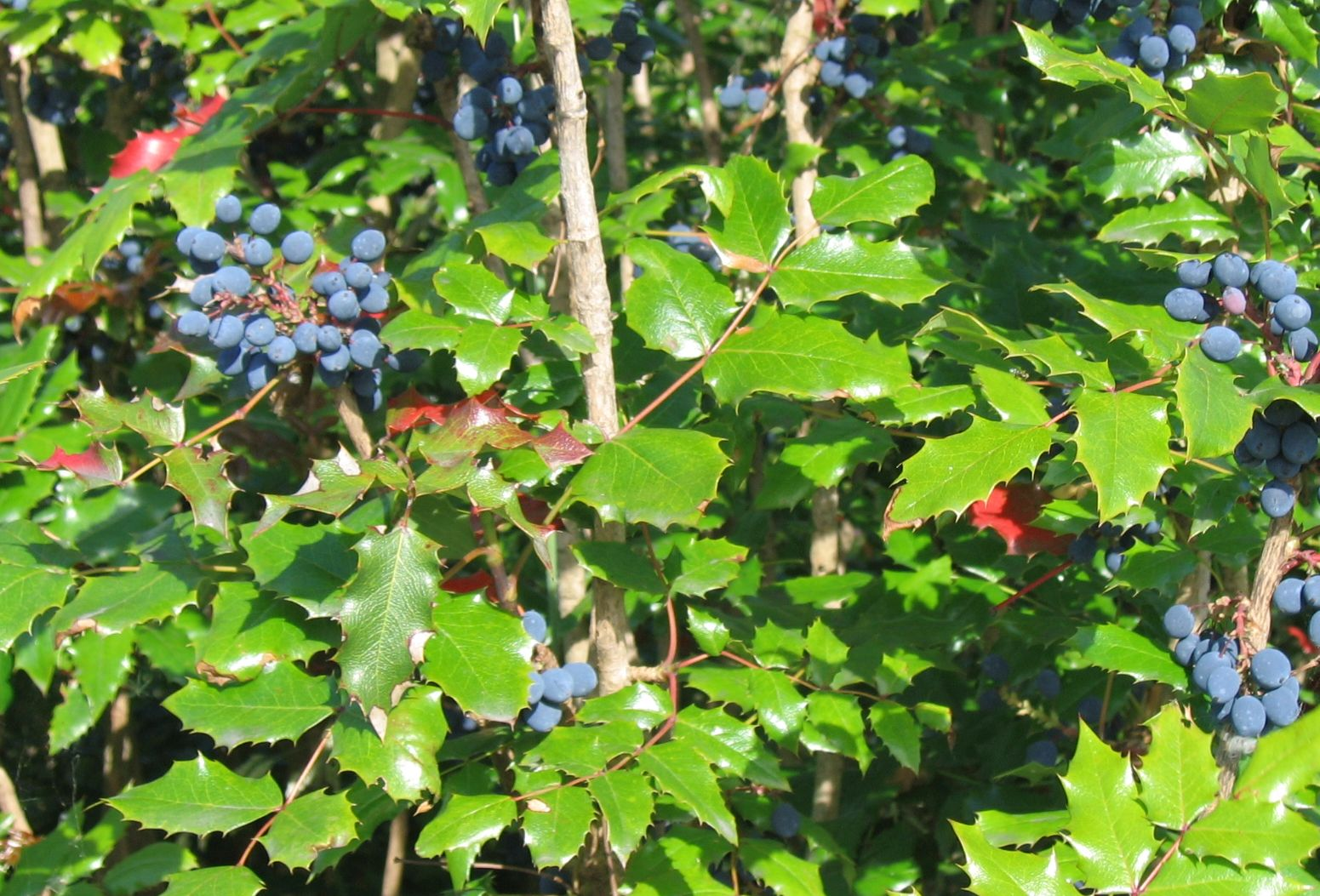
Oregon-grape, a shrub found in Oaks Bottom

As of 2010, more than 185 bird species have been recorded in the refuge including herons, egrets, hawks, osprey, shorebirds, gulls, terns, hummingbirds, woodpeckers, grebes, falcons, vultures, waterfowl, and many others. Vegetation, which varies from one part of the refuge to another, includes Oregon white oak, Pacific madrone, ash, and black locust trees; ferns, Oregon-grape, Scotch broom, and poison oak, as well as rushes, sedges, and other plants. Invasive species, gradually being replaced by physical removal and burning, include reed canary grass, purple loosestrife, Himalayan blackberry, and others.

To regulate the flow of water into and out of the wetlands, the parks department adds or removes boards at a small dam near the railroad berm. The idea is to replicate conditions that existed when the wetlands were fully connected to the river. Part of the water in the wetlands comes from natural springs, and part of the water comes from the river, when it runs high in the winter. Beavers have at times foiled the plan by damming the small stream that carries water between the lake and the river. The parks department has foiled the rodents by running a perforated pipe through the beaver dam.
