= Sellwood Park =

Public park in Portland, Oregon, U.S.

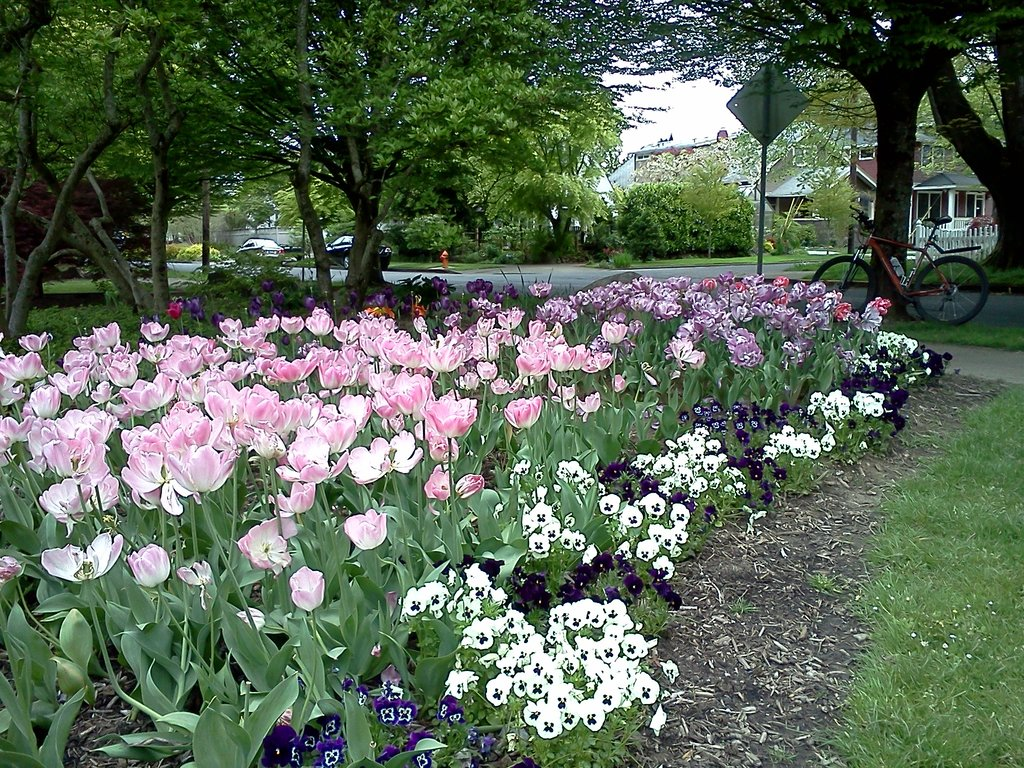
- Flowers in the park in 2011
- Interactive map of Sellwood Park
- Type: Urban park
- Location: SE 7th Ave. and Miller St. Portland, Oregon
- Coordinates: 45°28′05″N 122°39′33″W
- Area: 16.65 acres (6.74 ha)
- Created: 1909
- Operator: Portland Parks & Recreation
- Status: Open 5 a.m. to midnight

Sellwood Park is a city park of about 17 acres (6.9 ha) in southeast Portland, in the U.S. state of Oregon.

== Description and history ==
Located at Southeast Seventh Avenue and Miller Street, the park includes courts for tennis and basketball; fields for soccer, baseball, softball, and football; picnic areas; a horseshoe pit; a playground; paved and unpaved paths, and restrooms. The Springwater Corridor trail runs north–south along the west side of the park between it and Sellwood Riverfront Park and Oaks Amusement Park. Oaks Bottom Wildlife Refuge is just north of Sellwood Park.

== Activities ==
Sellwood Park offers a number of activities such as a playground, soccer, baseball, softball, basketball, tennis courts and pickleball courts.
