= Sellwood Bridge =

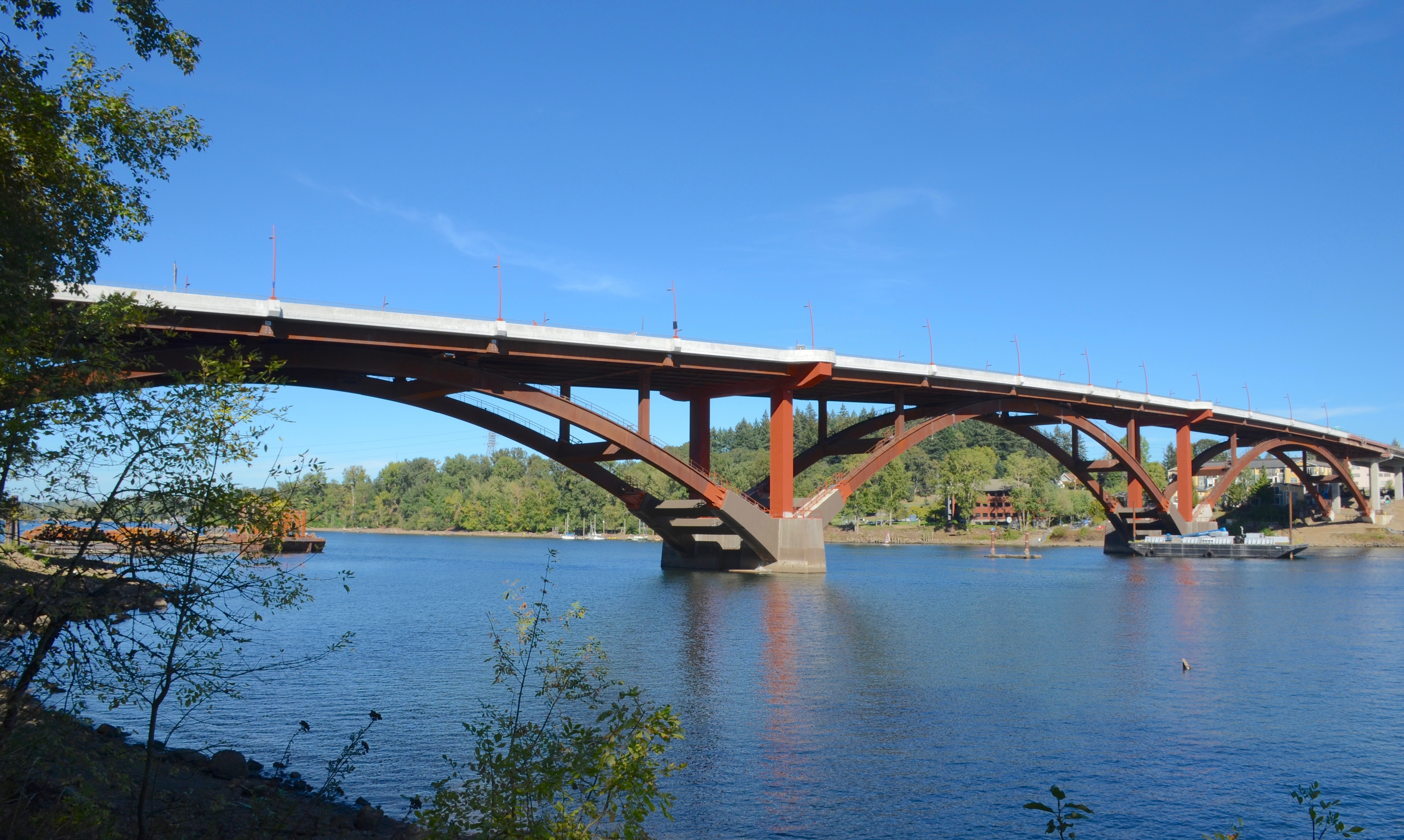
- The new bridge in September 2016
- Coordinates: 45.46429°N 122.66564°W
- Carries: 2 traffic lanes, pedestrians, cyclists
- Crosses: Willamette River
- Locale: Portland, OR
- Owner: Multnomah County

Characteristics
- Design: Deck arch bridge
- Total length: 1,976 ft (602 m)
- Width: 64 ft (20 m)
- Longest span: 465 ft (142 m)
- Clearance below: 72 feet (22 m) charted 75 feet (23 m) actual

History
- Architect: Safdie Rabines Architects
- Construction cost: $290 million (projected)
- Opened: February 29, 2016

Location
- Interactive map of Sellwood Bridge

The Sellwood Bridge is a deck arch bridge that spans the Willamette River in Portland, Oregon, in the United States. The current bridge opened in 2016 and replaced a 1925 span that had carried the same name. The original bridge was Portland's first fixed-span bridge and, being the only river crossing for miles in each direction, the busiest two-lane bridge in Oregon.

The Sellwood Bridge links the Sellwood and Westmoreland neighborhoods of Portland on the east side with Oregon Route 43/Macadam Avenue on the west side. At its east end it leads to Tacoma Street. The bridge is owned and operated by Multnomah County. The original span of 1925 was a steel truss bridge, while its 2016 replacement is a deck-arch-type bridge.

== Original bridge ==
Sellwood Bridge (1925)
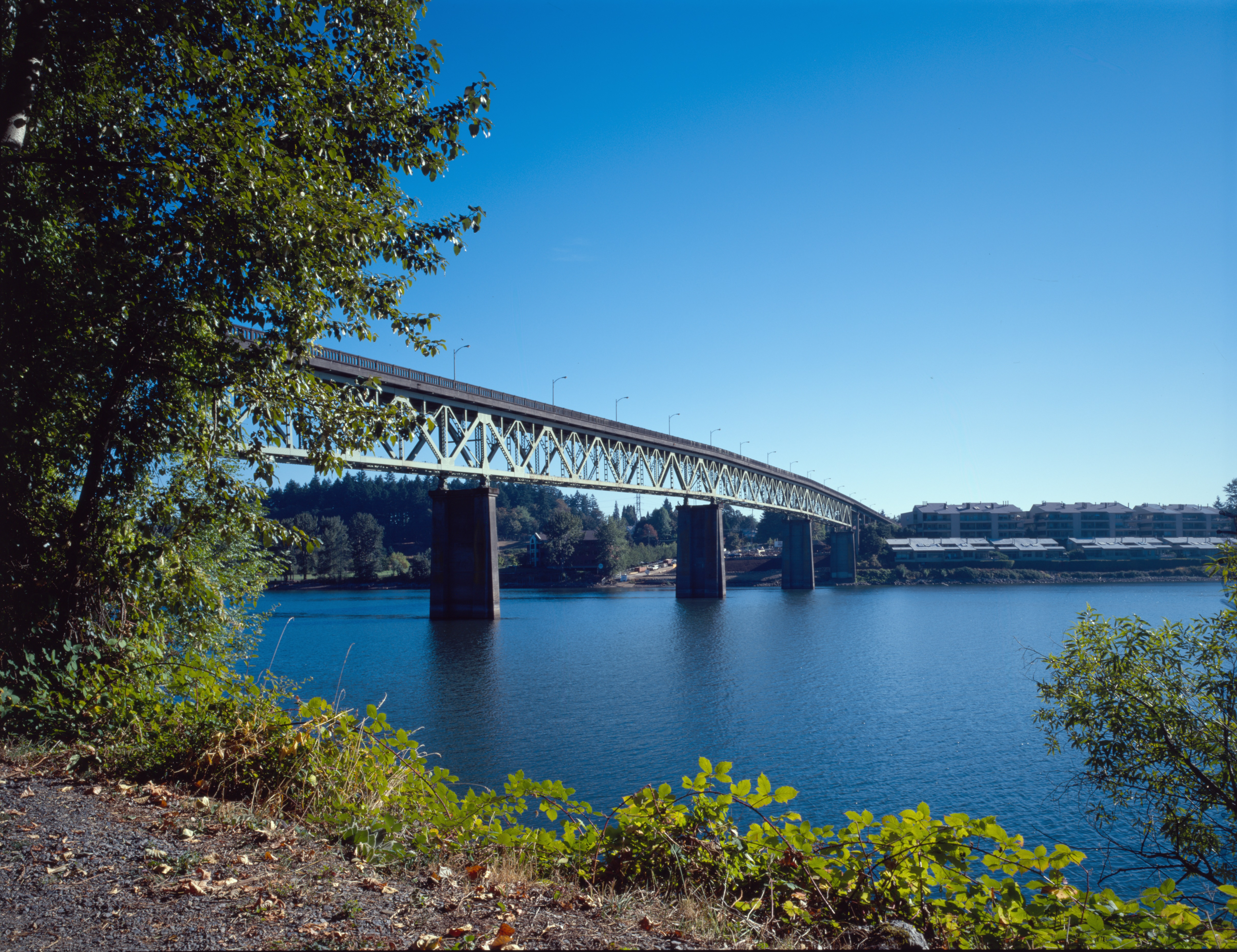
- The 1925 bridge, photographed in 1999
- Coordinates: 45°27′51″N 122°39′56″W
- Locale: Portland, Oregon

Characteristics
- Design: Truss bridge
- Total length: 1,971 ft (601 m)
- Width: 28 ft (8.5 m)
- Longest span: 300 ft (91 m)
- Clearance below: 75 ft (23 m)

History
- Opened: December 15, 1925
- Closed: February 25, 2016

Statistics
- Daily traffic: 30,000 (2005)

Designed by Gustav Lindenthal, the first bridge opened on December 15, 1925, at a final cost of $541,000 (equivalent to $6.9 million in 2011). It was 1,971 feet (601 m) long with 75 feet (23 m) of vertical waterway clearance. It had four continuous spans, all of Warren type. The two center spans were 300 feet (91 m) long, and the two outside spans were 246 feet (75 m) each. The girders from the old Burnside Bridge (built in 1894) were reused at each end. The two-lane roadway was 24 feet (7.3 m) wide, and there was a sidewalk along one side.

In the 1960s, a rebuild of the bridge was proposed as part of an east–west freeway that would follow Johnson Creek Boulevard between I-5 and I-205.

== Deficiencies and replacement ==
In the 2000s, discussions began to intensify over the bridge's condition, which had been deteriorating since the 1960s. Upon discovery of cracks in both concrete approaches in January 2004, the weight limit on the bridge was lowered from 32 tons to 10 tons. This caused the diversion of about 1,400 daily truck and bus trips, including 94 daily TriMet bus trips. Over the few years that followed, there was debate on whether the bridge should be replaced, repaired, closed altogether, or closed for automotive traffic (but left open for pedestrians and bicycles). In April 2005, Bechtel gave Multnomah County an unsolicited plan to replace the bridge through a public-private partnership.

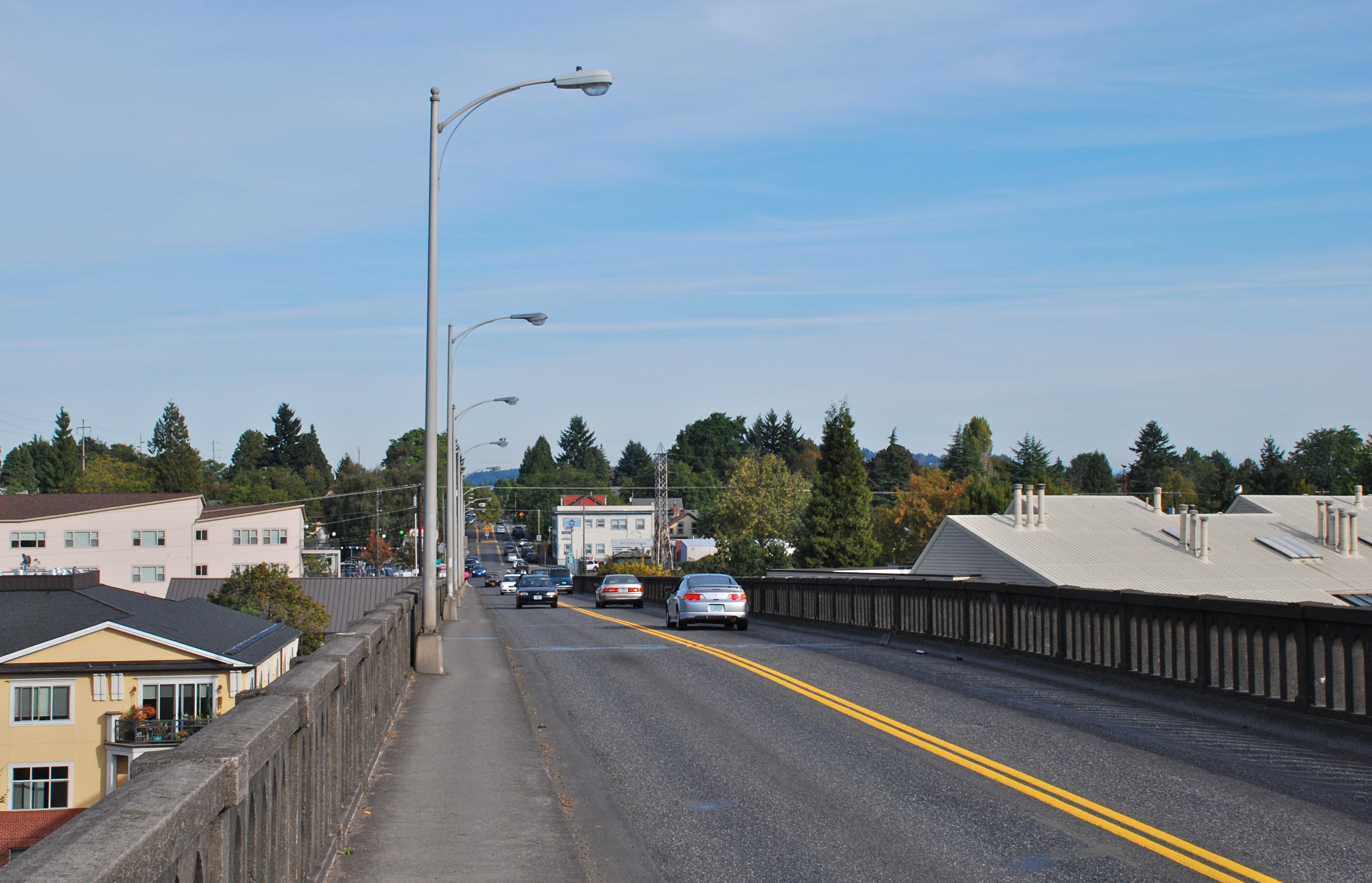
A street-level view of the old bridge. The replacement bridge has much wider sidewalks, on both sides, and dedicated bike lanes.

Discussions over possible replacement of the bridge also considered changes that a new bridge might incorporate in order to make the structure more usable for cyclists and pedestrians than the bridge it would replace. The 1925 bridge included no designated space for bicycle traffic, which had grown in more recent decades, and with only a single traffic lane in each direction, there was also very little room for cars to move over when passing bicycles in the roadway. There was a sidewalk on the north side, but its width was a relatively narrow 4 feet 3 inches (1.30 m) and the street light foundations shared space with the sidewalk, making the sidewalk's usable width at those points about 3 feet (36 inches, 91 cm). Allowing for safety clearances, there was less than 2 feet (24 inches, 61 cm) of usable sidewalk. The Bicycle Transportation Alliance listed the Sellwood Bridge as one of the top ten priorities for improving Portland's bicycling.

In July 2007, the Multnomah County Board of Commissioners considered several options for a replacement bridge. At the time, the top option was a 75-foot-wide (23 m) bridge with two car lanes and two transit lanes, running just south of the current bridge, with a projected cost of $302 million. In November 2008, however, the Sellwood Bridge team issued a draft Environmental Impact Statement containing details on five different finalist designs and alignments. In February 2009, the Policy Advisory Group (PAG), based on recommendations provided by a Community Task Force and the public, selected a Locally Preferred Alternative (LPA). The LPA included replacement of the existing bridge with a new bridge, alignment approximately 15 feet south of Tacoma Street, allowing continuous traffic flow at the crossing during construction, a pedestrian-actuated signal at Tacoma Street and SE 6th Avenue, and a signal at the west end interchange. The LPA is 64 feet (or less) wide and consists of two traffic lanes, two bike lanes, and two 12-foot (3.7 m) wide sidewalks. A final Environmental Impact Statement was published in spring 2010, and it was approved by the Federal Highway Administration in July 2010.

After evaluation in 2010 of several different possible designs, a two-lane steel deck arch bridge was chosen for the replacement bridge. This was approved by the Multnomah County Commission on January 27, 2011. The new bridge is strong enough to carry streetcars and the design will include some provisions intended to make the potential installation of a streetcar line across the bridge easier, should city officials later decide to build such a line. Plans to include streetcar tracks were briefly considered in late 2010, but dropped in January 2011 to reduce costs.

In an October 2011 study, the Department of Transportation wrote that the Sellwood Bridge must be replaced 'immediately'. On December 15, 2011, the county received U.S. federal funding sufficient to begin immediate work on a replacement. On July 19, 2012, Multnomah County commissioners approved a $299 million design for a new bridge.

On July 19, 2012, a final design was approved by Multnomah County commissioners. The design is a steel deck arch bridge with pedestrian and bicycle lanes on both sides. Construction was funded with $136 million from the county (raised from a $17 annual vehicle registration fee), $33 million from the federal government, $35 million from the state, and $84.5 million from the city of Portland. Clackamas County was originally to provide some funding due to the bridge’s use by many residents of that county, but that plan was later rejected by voters.

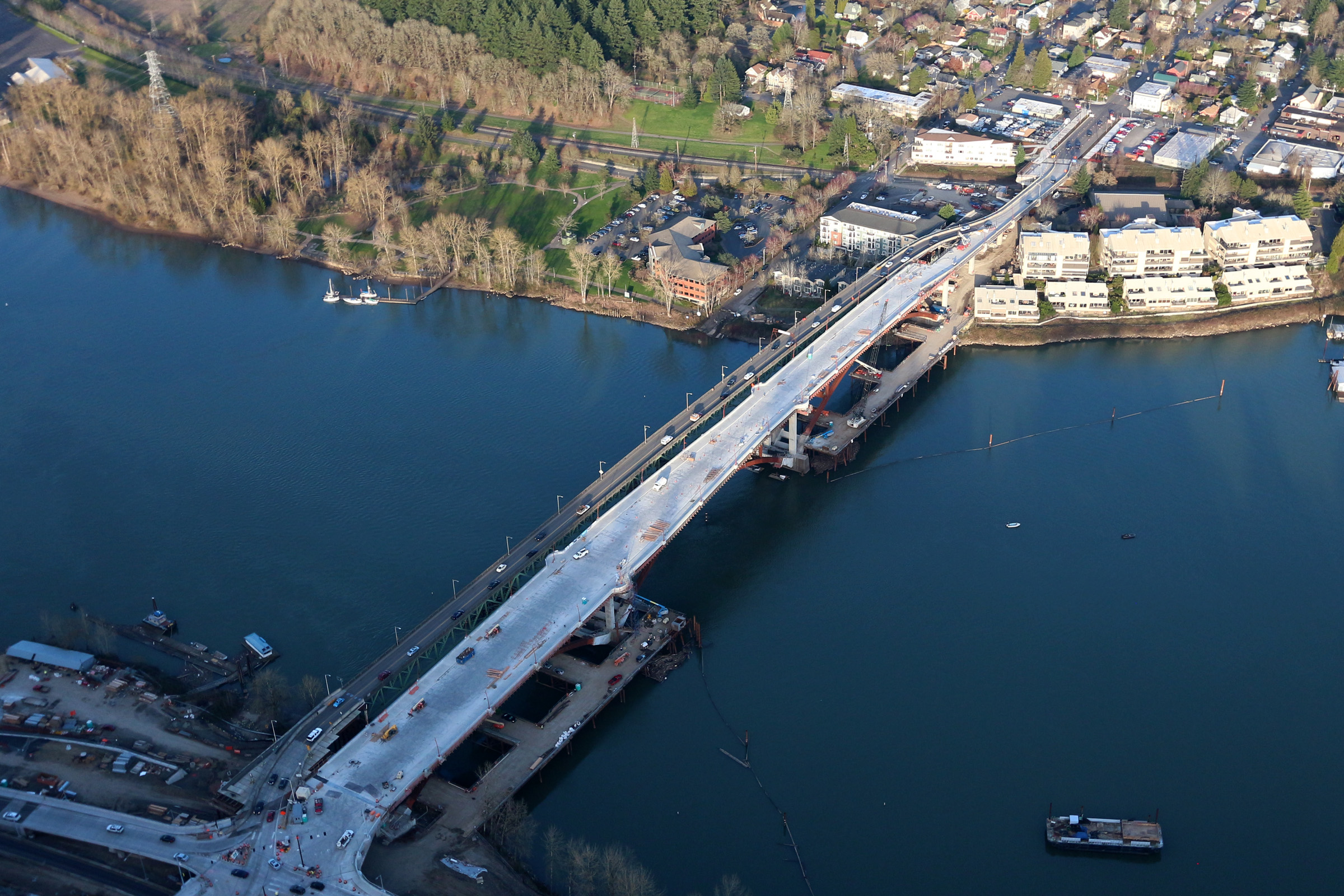
February 2016 aerial photo showing the nearly completed replacement bridge alongside the old bridge

On January 19, 2013, the 6.8-million pound bridge was moved onto temporary steel supports by contractor Omega Morgan. The moved bridge, known as a shoofly bridge, served as a temporary span until the new crossing opened. After more than three years of use on temporary supports, the old bridge closed to traffic permanently on February 25, 2016, and the new bridge opened to traffic on February 29, 2016. In between, on February 27, an opening celebration event took place on the new span with access to pedestrians and cyclists only. Crews began demolishing the original railings and bridge deck once the old span closed, with the process completed in May 2016. The steel trusses were then cut into pieces and lowered onto barges using hydraulic jacks, and the temporary steel supports were dismantled.

== Design ==
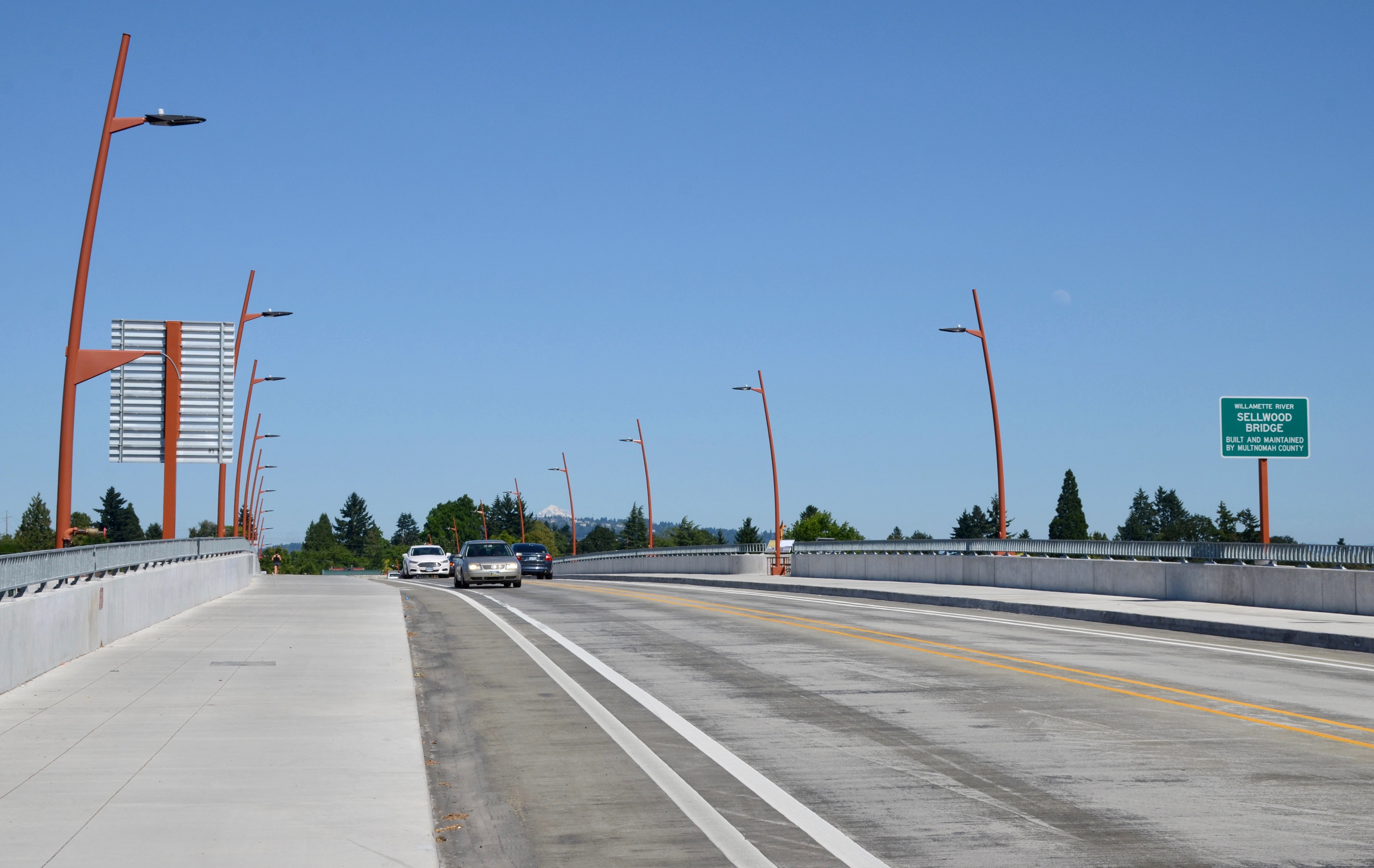
Deck of the new bridge, showing the wider traffic lanes, much wider sidewalk and new dedicated lanes for bicycles

The new Sellwood Bridge stretches a total of 1,976 feet (602 m) across the Willamette River. The deck arch design’s longest span is 465 feet (142 m) long and rests on a total of two piers in the water. There are a total of three arches carrying the 64-foot (20 m) wide span. The deck carries two lanes of traffic, bicycle lanes in both directions, and sidewalks on both sides. The architect for the new Sellwood Bridge was Safdie Rabines Architects with T.Y. Lin International serving as Prime Consultant for Final Design. The final design reduced the bridge footprint significantly from early concepts, lowering project costs and minimizing environmental disturbances. The final bridge design is also based on contemporary seismic codes and satisfies both a 475-year return period event for operations and a 975-year return period for safety.

== See also ==
- List of bridges documented by the Historic American Engineering Record in Oregon
- List of crossings of the Willamette River
