= 40-Mile Loop =

Multi-use trail in Portland, Oregon, US

Coordinates: 45.478956°N 122.721019°W

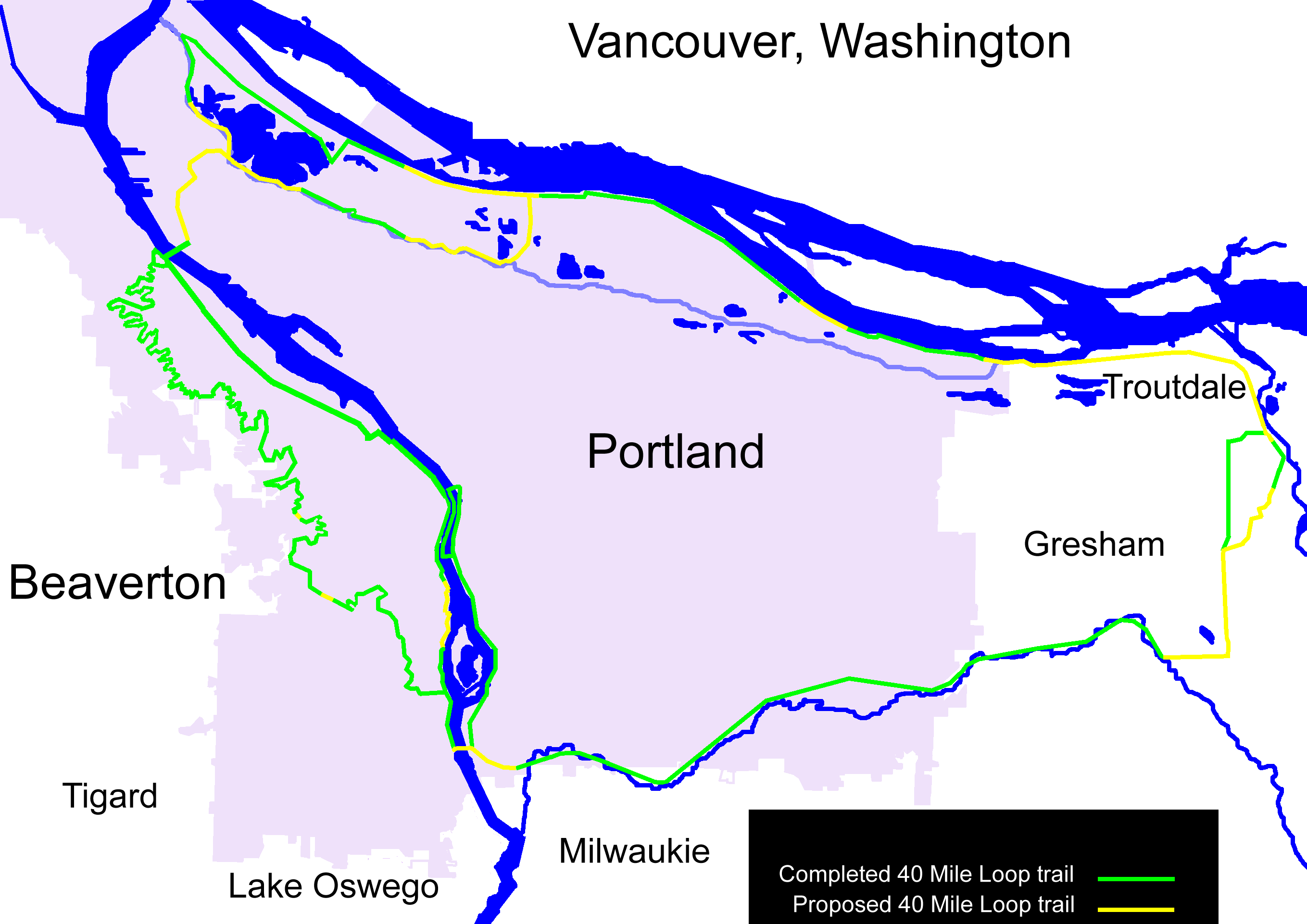
Map of the 40-Mile Loop Completed trail Proposed trail

The 40-Mile Loop is a partially completed greenway trail around and through Portland in the U.S. state of Oregon. It was proposed in 1903 by the Olmsted Brothers architecture firm as part of the development of Forest Park. One greenway expert calls it "one of the most creative and resourceful greenway projects in the country."

The name's "forty" was obsolete within a few decades after it was proposed. The proposed total path is now about 140 miles (230 km) long, and connects more than thirty city parks. Similarly, "loop" is not entirely accurate. There are several subloops, cutoffs and spur trails within the system. One spur is proposed to connect to the Pacific Crest Trail.

== History ==
As part of beautification planning for the Lewis and Clark Centennial Exposition of 1905, Portland's recently established Parks Board invited the Olmsted Brothers in 1903. Besides suggestions for Washington Park, their research of existing city parks resulted in a bold proposal for a loop of interconnected parks around the city, instead of a traditional plan of scattered parks: "A connected system of parks and parkways is manifestly far more complete and useful than a series of isolated parks." As the brothers puzzled over a name for the system, one asked the other "What would you call a forty-mile loop?" The firm was famous for its straightforward names, so they left it at that.

Little action occurred until a $1 million—equivalent to $33.7 million today—city bond measure in 1907 passed, which was used to develop existing parks. In 1912, another city planner, Edward H. Bennett, also recommended developing a ridgetop park long the West Hills. A $2 million bond issue to acquire the necessary land was voted down. However, shortly afterward, most of the lots sold in Forest Park forfeited to the city or Multnomah County due to high assessments for road building, and a landslide.

In 1943, influential urban planner Robert Moses was hired, and recommended establishing Forest Park. After several subsequent years of controversy, the park was created in 1948 from tax-delinquent lands, gifts, and purchases. This contained the first portion of the 40-mile (64 km) loop.

Little more happened until 1978: at the request of Oregon legislators, U.S. Congress stripped the Columbia Slough of its "navigable" status, enabling the land to be dedicated to recreational use, an important component of the Olmsted plan. The Oregon director of the Nature Conservancy responded to withering federal funds for parks and natural areas by reviving the loop plan to enthusiastic receptions by the City, suburban cities, federal agencies, conservationists, and civic groups. The alliance eventually formed the 40-Mile Loop Land Trust which proved most effective at getting the thirteen key governmental entities—which normally did not talk to each other—to effectively work together. It also served as an intermediary to transfer property from one entity to the other.

One of the Land Trust's major victories was bringing Southern Pacific and Union Pacific railroads together, which jointly owned the abandoned Springwater Corridor, to transfer the land in 1990 to the Trust. It represented significant progress in the completion of the loop.

== Trail ==
The trail has a variety of sections: some are on level ground, such as along the Columbia River; others are heavily forested and/or mountainous, as through Washington Park's Hoyt Arboretum. All portions are suitable for walking and hiking, and most are open to bicycling. There are opportunities for strollers, wheelchairs, skating, skateboarding, horseback riding, canoeing, and kayaking.

== Route highlights ==
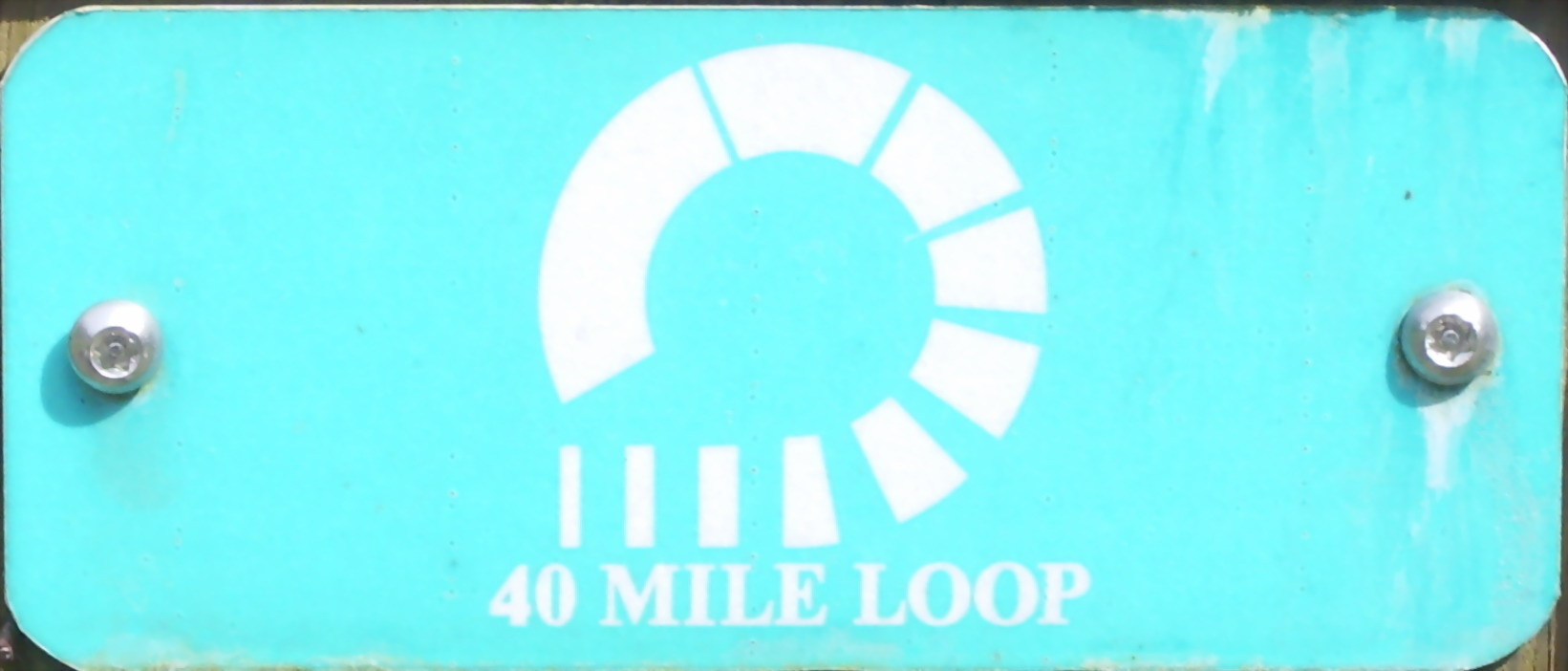
The 40-Mile Loop logo is posted along many types of paths

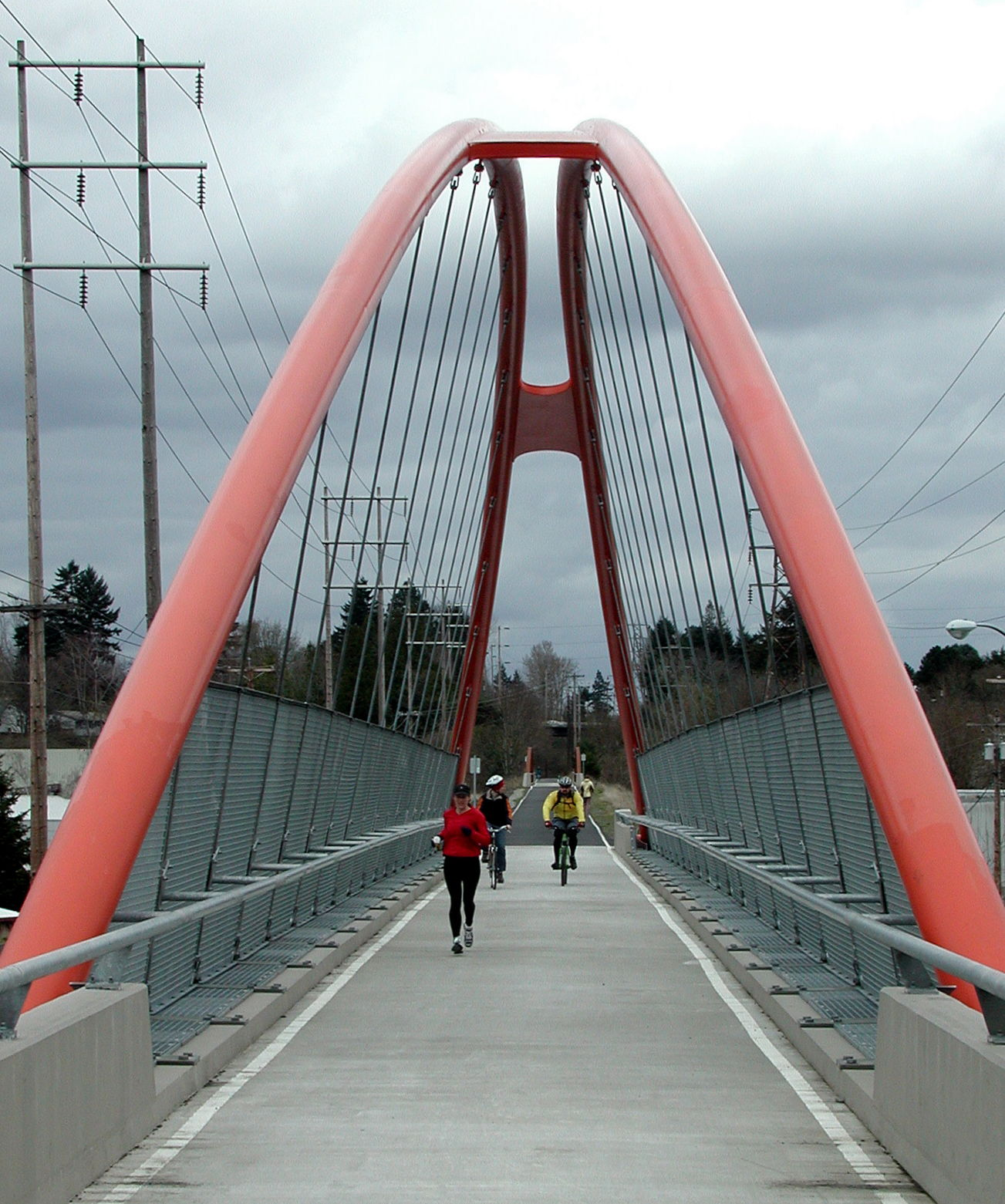
The Springwater Trail, part of the 40-Mile Loop, crosses over McLoughlin Boulevard (Oregon Route 99E) near Sellwood.

- St. Johns Bridge
- Kelley Point Park
- N. and NE Marine Drive along the south bank of the Columbia River
- Smith and Bybee Wetlands Natural Area
- Columbia Slough
- Blue Lake Park
- Troutdale, Oregon
- Mount Hood Community College
- Gresham, Oregon
- Springwater Corridor
  - Gresham Main City Park
  - Gresham Butte
  - Powell Butte Nature Park
  - Leach Botanical Garden
  - Tideman Johnson Natural Area
  - Sellwood Park
  - Sellwood Riverfront Park
  - Oaks Amusement Park
  - Oaks Bottom Wildlife Refuge
- Eastbank Esplanade
- Hawthorne Bridge
- Steel Bridge
- I-205 Bike Path
- Sellwood Bridge
- Willamette Greenway
  - Willamette Park
  - South Waterfront
- Wildwood Trail
  - Washington Park
    - World Forestry Center
    - Oregon Vietnam Veterans Memorial
    - Hoyt Arboretum
  - Pittock Mansion
  - Forest Park
  - Audubon Society of Portland

== Future ==
The 40-Mile Loop spur Springwater Corridor radiates eastward through Gresham and into Boring. Metro has proposed constructing the Cazadero Trail which would extend that spur 2 miles (3.2 km) past Estacada for eventual connection to the Pacific Crest Trail.

== See also ==
- Mount Tabor, another park included in the Olmsted plan
