= Springwater =

Springwater may refer to one of these places:

- Springwater, New York, United States
- Springwater, Ontario, Canada
- Springwater, Saskatchewan, Canada
  - Springwater (Barrie Airpark) Aerodrome, located near Springwater, Ontario, Canada
- Springwater, Oregon, United States
  - Springwater Corridor, a bicycle and pedestrian trail named for Springwater, Oregon, United States
- Springwater, Wisconsin, United States

Other

- Springwater, a pseudonym for the musician Phil Cordell
