= Saxeville (community), Wisconsin =

Saxeville
- Unincorporated community
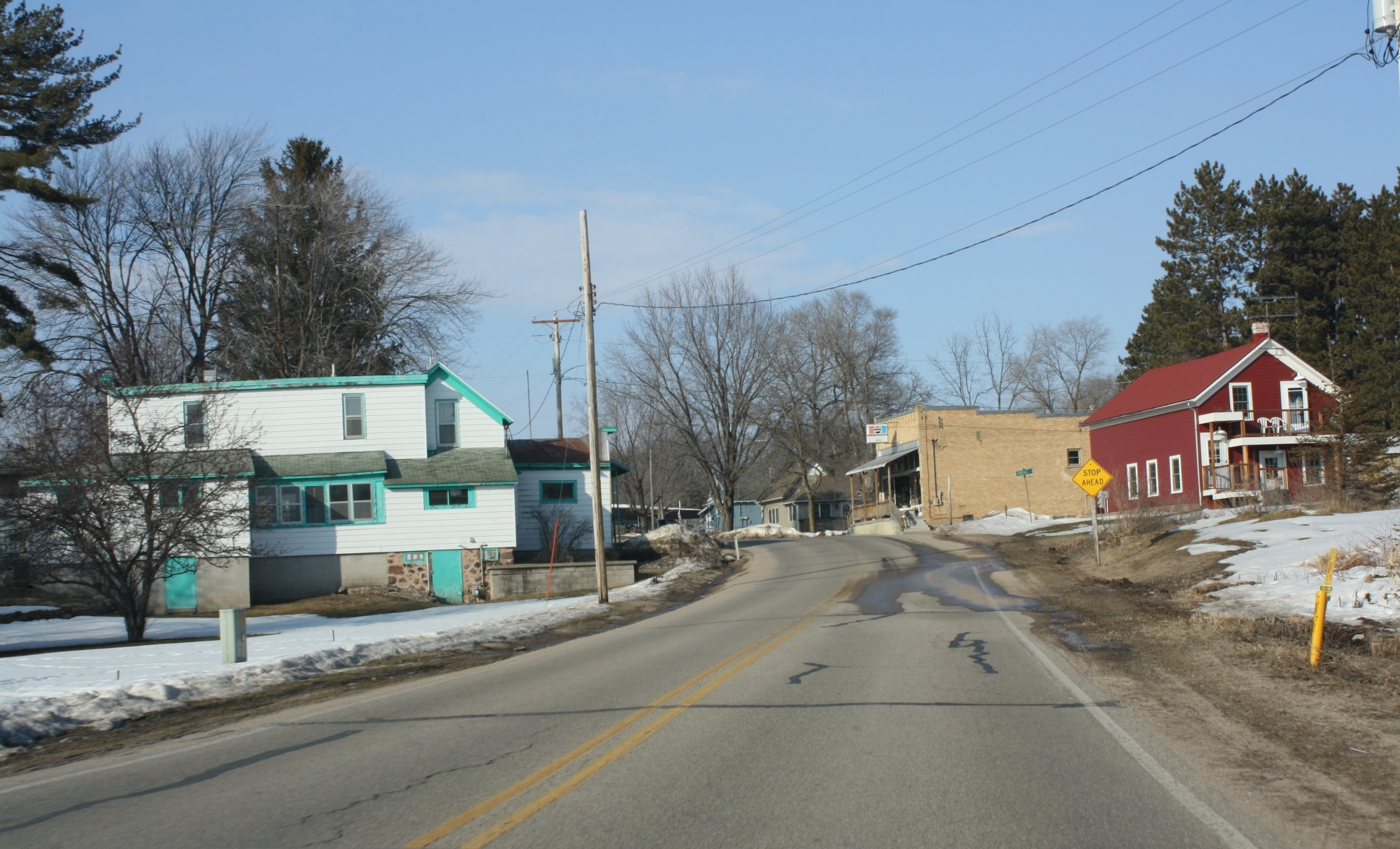
- Downtown Saxeville

- Location within the state of Wisconsin Saxeville (the United States)
- Coordinates: 44.1760899°N 89.1145606°W
- Country: United States
- State: Wisconsin
- County: Waushara
- Elevation: 846 ft (258 m)
- Time zone: UTC-6 (Central (CST))
  - Summer (DST): UTC-5 (CDT)
- Area code: 920

Saxeville is an unincorporated community in the town of Saxeville in Waushara County, Wisconsin, United States. It is located at the intersection of County W and County A.

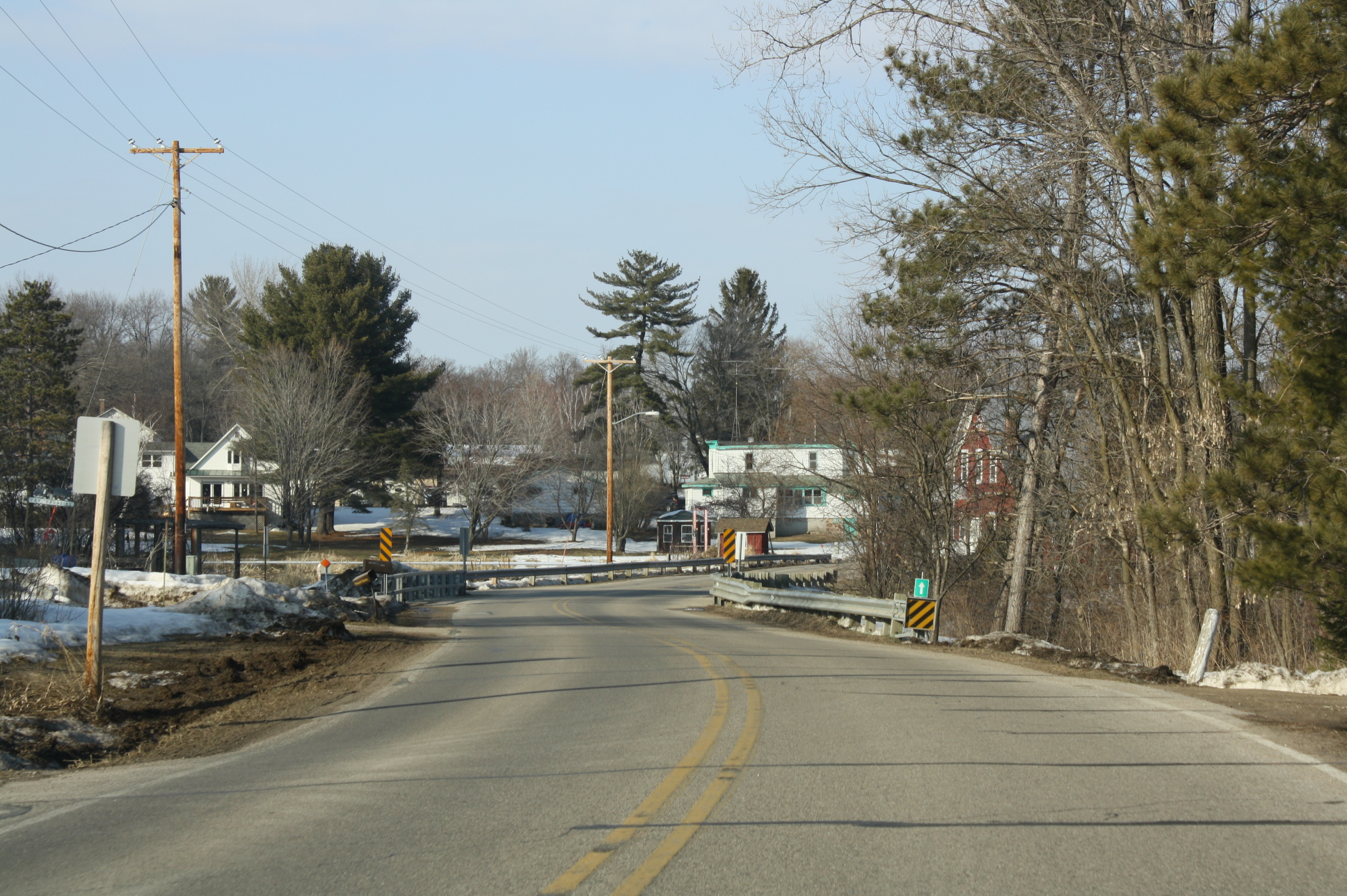
Downtown Saxeville

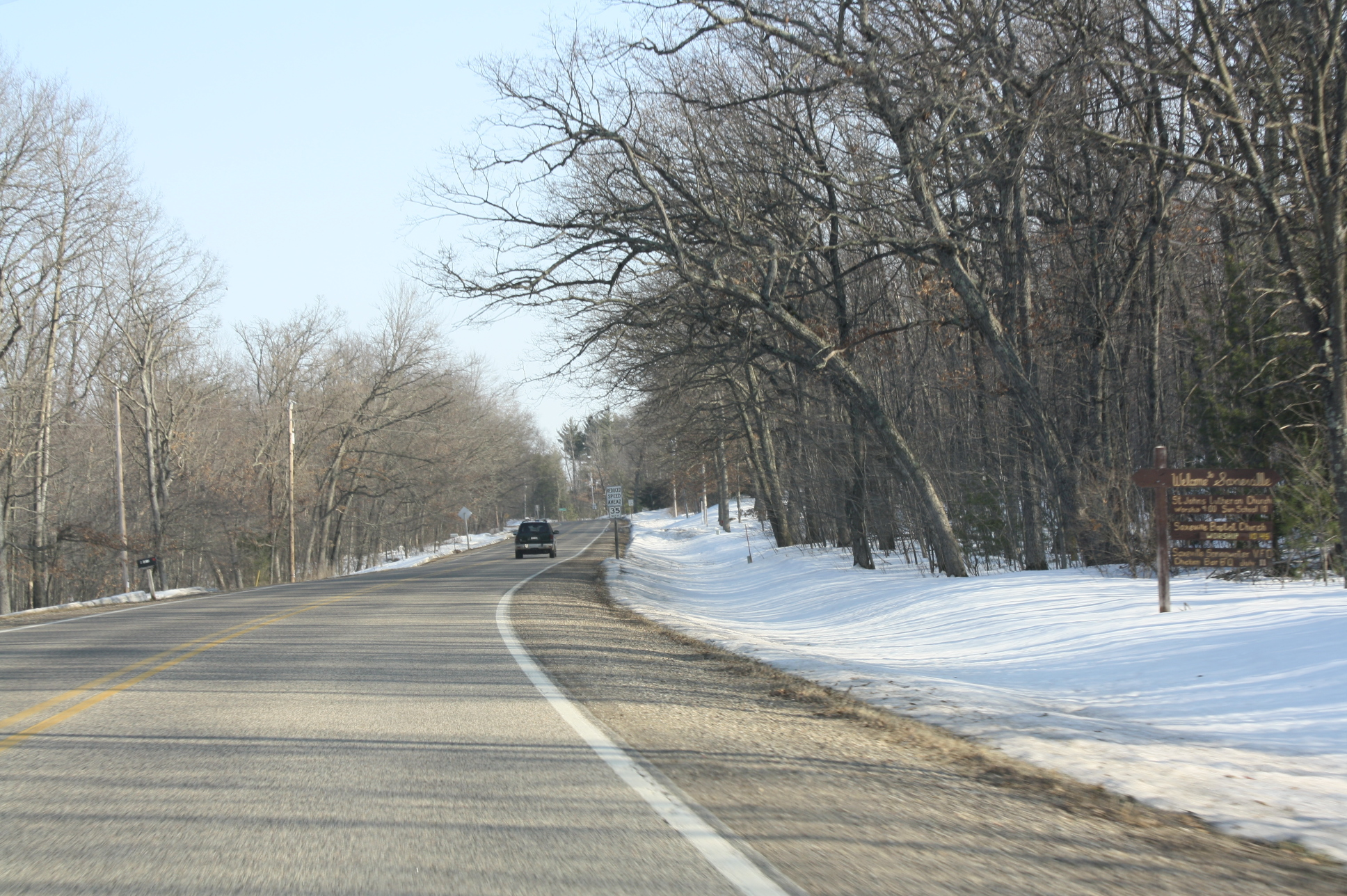
Welcome sign

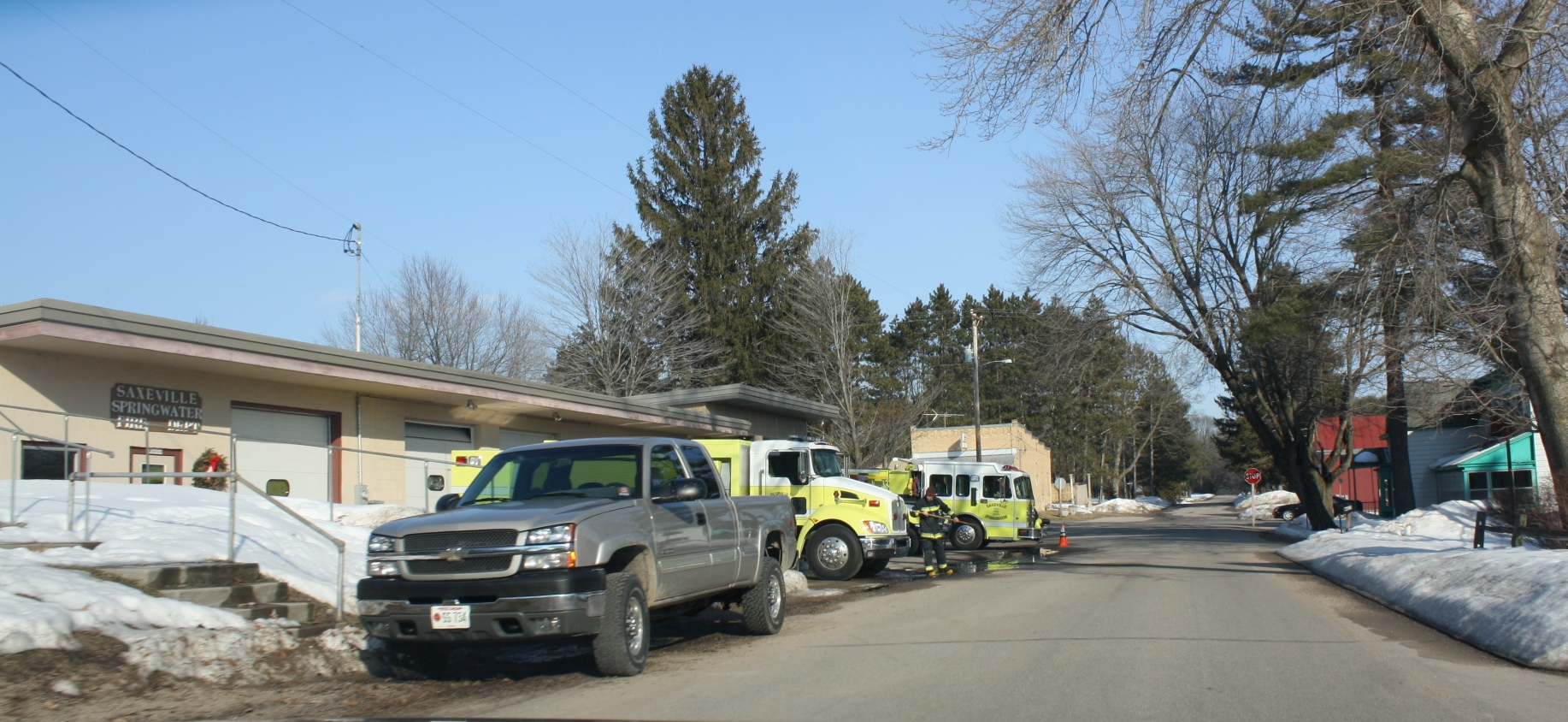
Saxeville/Springwater fire department
