= Pine Lake (Springwater, Wisconsin) =

Lake in the United States

- Location within Wisconsin
- Location: Springwater, Wisconsin
- Coordinates: 44°13′57″N 89°09′45″W
- Type: Holomictic
- Basin countries: United States
- Max. length: 270 m (886 ft)
- Max. width: 130 m (427 ft)
- Surface area: 55.4419 ha (137.0 acres)
- Max. depth: 14.63 m (48 ft)
- Water volume: 3,414,273 m^{3} (120,573,900 cu ft)
- Surface elevation: 270 m (890 ft)
- Frozen: late November-early April

Pine Lake is a deep seepage lake near the community of Springwater, Wisconsin, in Waushara County, located in central Wisconsin. It is one of eight lakes that can be found in the township of Springwater. This lake is 137 acres with a 48-foot maximum depth. It is a popular attraction for both fisherman and boaters.

Pine Lake is holomictic, which means that the water layers mix at least once a year throughout the whole lake. The water of the lake is moderately clear.

== Origins and history ==
Pine Lake was formed as a result of glacial melting thousands of years ago. Since it is a deep seepage lake, there were no inflows or outflows. Before settlers arrived in the area in 1851, the watershed was a hunting and fishing ground for Native Americans. Agriculture and farming dominated the shoreline and watershed of Pine Lake until cottages and development increased post World War II. From post World War II to current day the shoreline has been highly developed with homes. One exception to this development of shoreline is on the North shore of the western portion of the lake, which is owned by a Lutheran camp.

== Physical aspects ==
Pine Lake is a seepage lake, meaning it fills primarily through groundwater seepage. Runoff contributes to the lake's volume to a lesser extent.

Water clarity is considered "moderately clear" by the Wisconsin DNR.

Pine Lake is considered a mesotrophic lake, indicating increased vegetation as well as occasional algal blooms. These aspects are affected by the uses of the lake: boating and fishing.

As of May 2019, there was a major change to boating laws which may affect the lake habitat. The Wisconsin DNR, in coordination with lake residents by a poll, made the decision to introduce no wake restrictions for boaters on the lake in 2019. The elimination of wave disturbance from boaters may cause an increase in species richness.

The Pine Lake watershed is 2,679 acres. It is primarily forested. The shoreline environment mainly consists of wetlands and development consisting of lakeside cabins and homes. The water in the basin flows from north to south. This causes groundwater contamination as contaminants found north of the lake including fertilizer, manure, and pesticides—from local agriculture—enter the watershed.

Pine Lake has a mostly sandy bottom (90% sand and 10% muck).

Chemistry
Property	Value	Notes
Alkalinity	119 mg/L	
pH	8.6	
Chloride	2.3 mg/L	
Phosphorus	33 mg/L	
Potassium	55 mg/L	
Sodium	2.0 mg/L	
Water hardness	120 mg/L	moderate to high

== Flora and fauna ==
There are many aquatic plants located in Pine lake, the most common of which is muskgrass (Chara spp.) and stoneworts (Nitella spp.). Muskgrass serves as cover for fish species and is also a food source for birds. There were 24 species of aquatic plants counted from the Waushara County Lakes study, other species included a variety of pondweed species. The overall health of the aquatic plant community is listed as good, earning a C value of 8.

== Environmental concerns ==
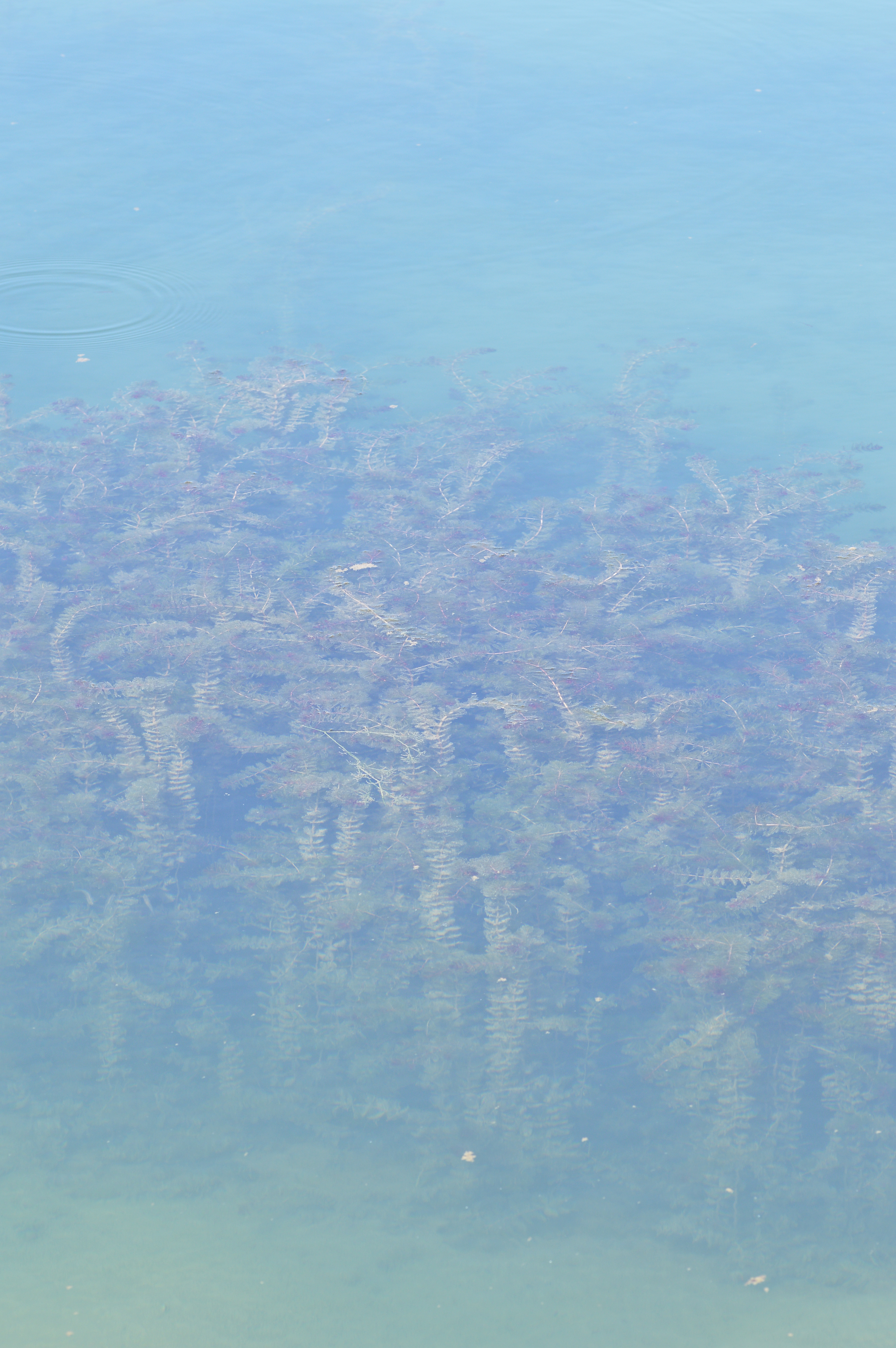
Eurasian Milfoil

=== Invasive species ===
Invasive species include the banded mystery snail, as well as Eurasian water-milfoil. Eurasian water-milfoil infestations cluster up in areas and are often caught in boat motors, thus making recreational activities such as fishing more difficult. Milfoi were first found in the lake in 2001 and can be a problem because they form up into dense beds and affect the fisheries, boaters, and dissolved oxygen in the lake.

=== Management ===
The lake plants are in good health and there are occasional blooms as with most of the mesotrophic lakes in the county. There are some agricultural lands in the basin of Pine lake and phosphorus is the most common chemical found in runoff in the basin. Studies and samples show that the agricultural chemical atrazine was found in small amounts (10 micrograms) in water samples.

== Recreation ==
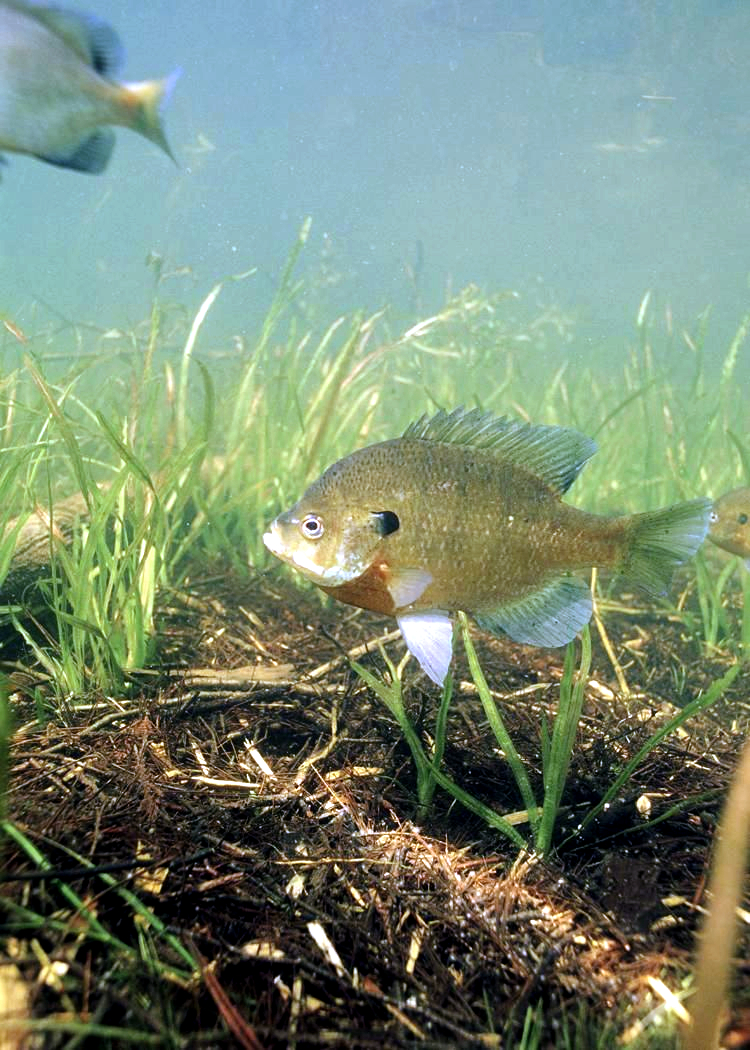
Image of a bluegill, one of the more common fish species in Pine Lake.

A Pine Lake survey concluded that the most valuable aspects of the lake were the amenity of living on the lake, participating in recreational activities, and viewing wildlife. It is common for boaters and kayakers to use the lake in the summer, and ice fishermen to use it during winter months.

=== Fishing ===
The most common species that are seen in the lake are largemouth bass and panfish. Some other species that can occasionally be seen are northern pike, walleye, black crappie, and rock bass.

== General references ==
- N. Turyk, R. Haney and D Rupp. 2014. Waushara County Lakes Study Pine Lake - Springwater, Final Report to Waushara County and Wisconsin Department of Natural Resources, UW-Stevens Point Center for Watershed Science & Education.
- "Water-Quality and Lake-Stage Data for Wisconsin Lakes, Water Years 2008-2011" (PDF). Retrieved 2 December 2020.
