= Saxeville, Wisconsin =

- Town
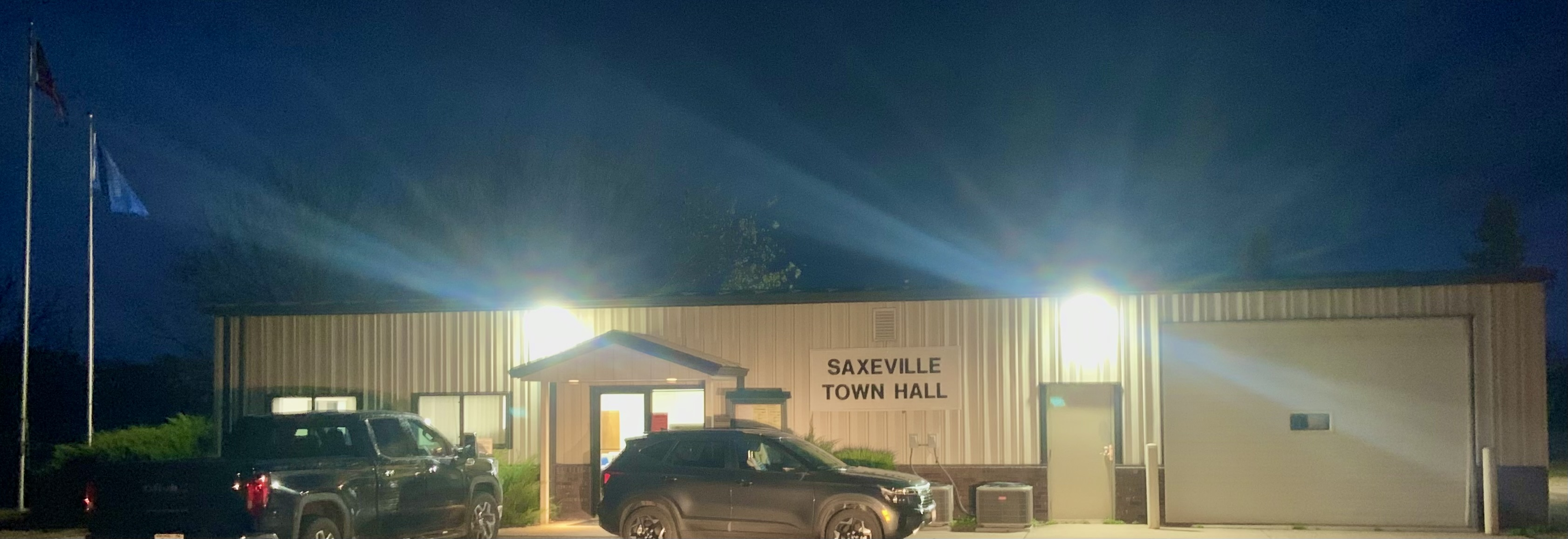
- Town hall

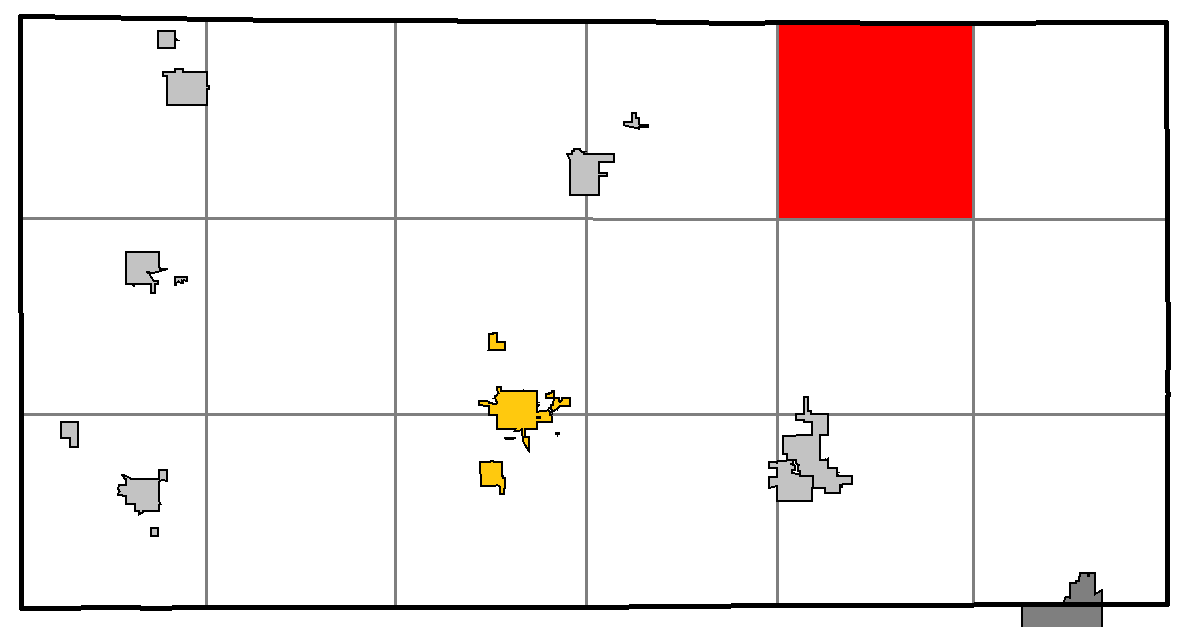
- Location of Saxeville, Waushara County

- Location of Waushara County, Wisconsin
- Coordinates: 44°12′14″N 89°3′15″W
- Country: United States
- State: Wisconsin
- County: Waushara

Area
  - Total: 36.6 sq mi (94.7 km^{2})
  - Land: 36.1 sq mi (93.4 km^{2})
  - Water: 0.50 sq mi (1.3 km^{2})
- Elevation: 971 ft (296 m)

Population (2020)
  - Total: 996
  - Density: 27.6/sq mi (10.7/km^{2})
- Time zone: UTC-6 (Central (CST))
  - Summer (DST): UTC-5 (CDT)
- FIPS code: 55-71825
- GNIS feature ID: 1584105

Saxeville is a town in Waushara County, Wisconsin, United States. The population was 996 at the 2020 census. The unincorporated community of Saxeville is located in the town.

== Geography ==
According to the United States Census Bureau, the town has a total area of 36.5 square miles (94.7 km^{2}), of which 36.1 square miles (93.4 km^{2}) is land and 0.5 square mile (1.3 km^{2}) (1.34%) is water.

== Demographics ==
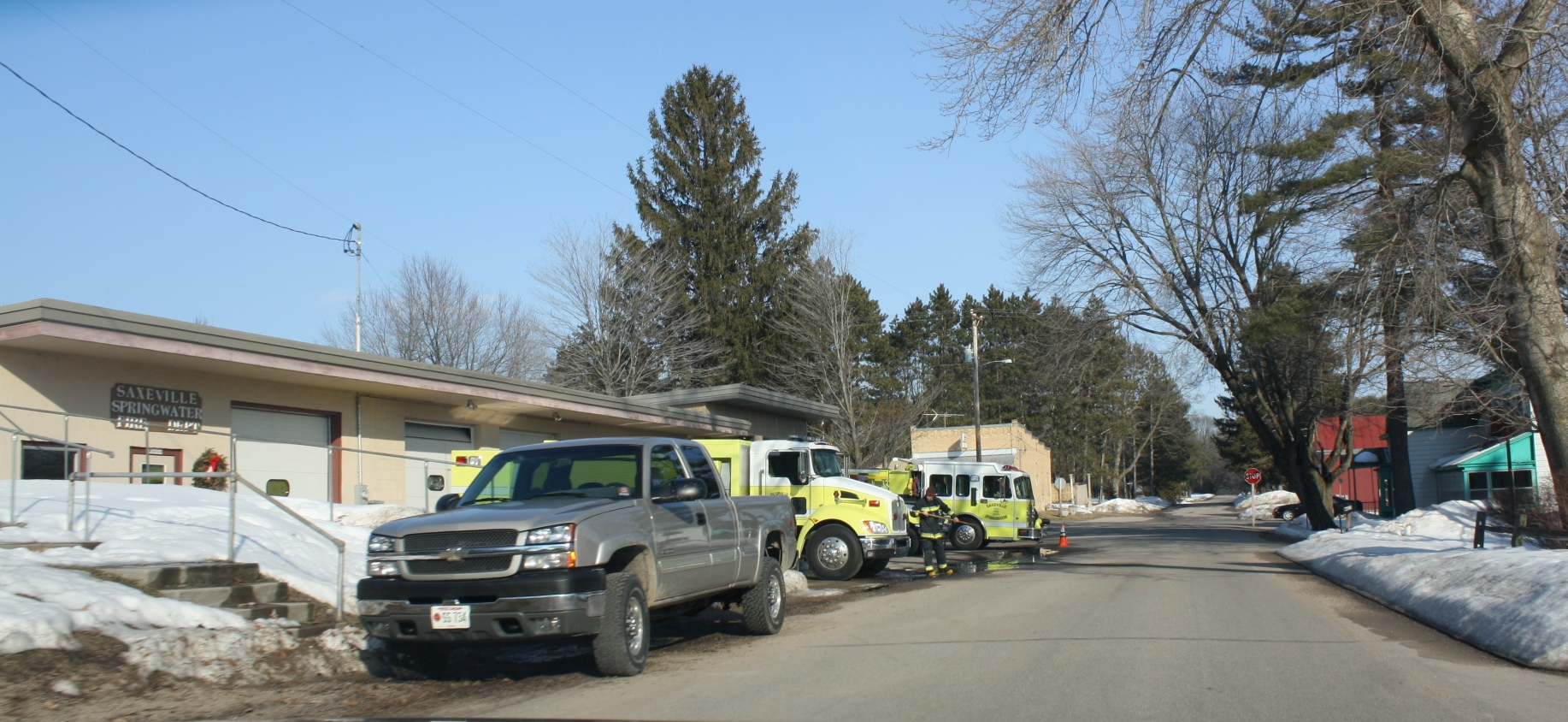
Saxeville/Springwater Fire Department

As of the census of 2000, there were 974 people, 393 households, and 312 families residing in the town. The population density was 27.0 people per square mile (10.4/km^{2}). There were 610 housing units at an average density of 16.9 per square mile (6.5/km^{2}). The racial makeup of the town was 98.97% White, 0.31% from other races, and 0.72% from two or more races. Hispanic or Latino of any race were 1.13% of the population.

There were 393 households, out of which 28.5% had children under the age of 18 living with them, 70.7% were married couples living together, 5.1% had a female householder with no husband present, and 20.6% were non-families. 18.1% of all households were made up of individuals, and 6.9% had someone living alone who was 65 years of age or older. The average household size was 2.48 and the average family size was 2.78.

In the town, the population was spread out, with 22.9% under the age of 18, 4.1% from 18 to 24, 27.0% from 25 to 44, 28.9% from 45 to 64, and 17.1% who were 65 years of age or older. The median age was 43 years. For every 100 females, there were 105.5 males. For every 100 females age 18 and over, there were 104.1 males.

The median income for a household in the town was $39,688, and the median income for a family was $46,827. Males had a median income of $33,438 versus $24,464 for females. The per capita income for the town was $20,514. About 5.4% of families and 9.2% of the population were below the poverty line, including 14.7% of those under age 18 and 4.8% of those age 65 or over.
