= Springwater Corridor =

Bicycle and pedestrian trail in the Portland, Oregon metropolitan area

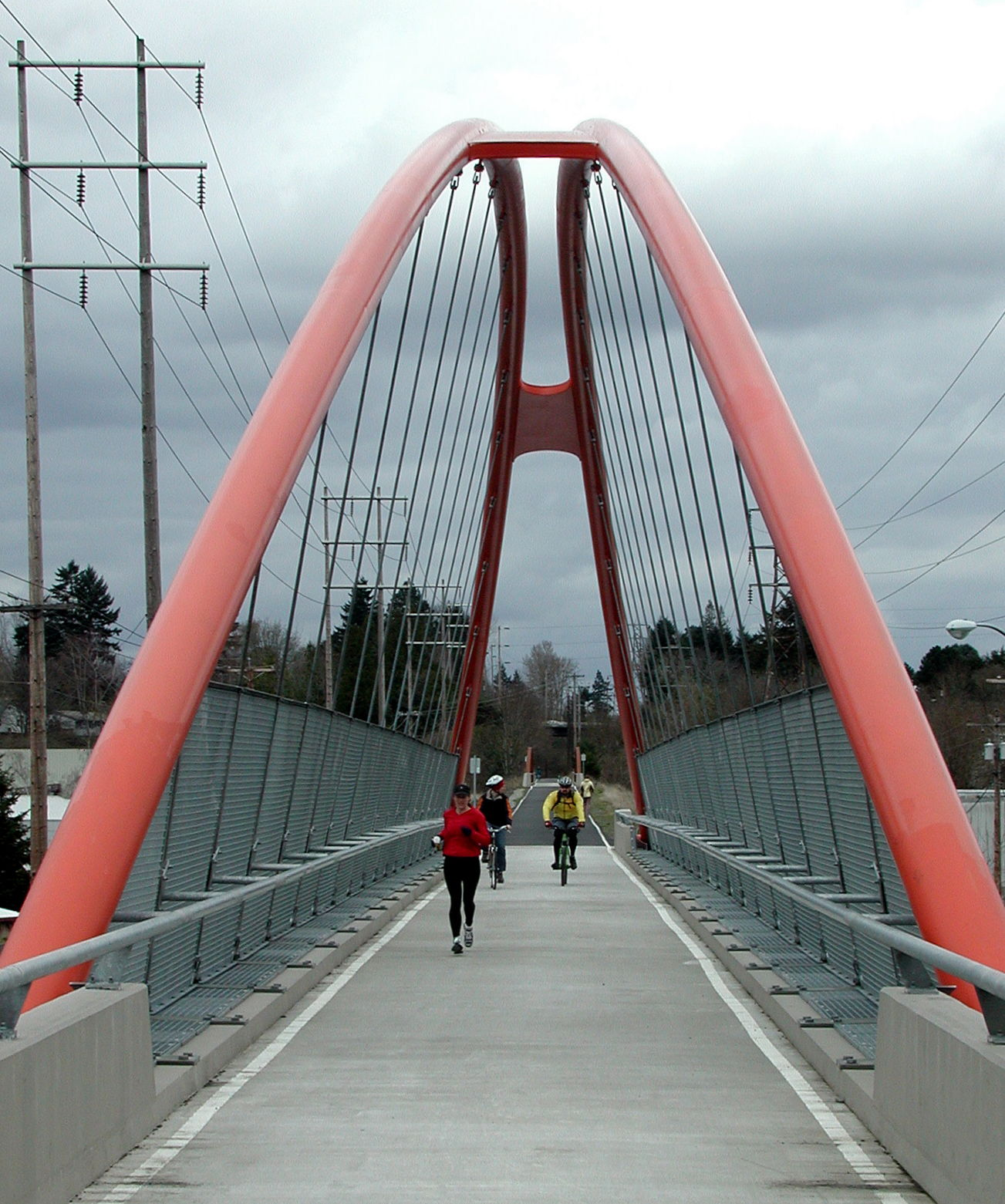
The Springwater Trail crosses over McLoughlin Boulevard (Oregon Route 99E) near Portland's Sellwood neighborhood.

The Springwater Corridor Trail is a bicycle and pedestrian rail trail in the Portland metropolitan area in Oregon, United States. It follows a former railway line from Boring through Gresham to Portland, where it ends south of the Eastbank Esplanade. Most of the corridor, about 21 miles (34 km) long, consists of paved, off-street trail, though about 1 mile (1.6 km) overlaps city streets in Portland's Sellwood neighborhood. A large segment roughly follows the course of Johnson Creek and crosses it on bridges many times. Much of the corridor was acquired by the City of Portland in 1990; remaining segments were acquired by Metro thereafter.

The trail is part of the Portland area's 40-Mile Loop trail system. It connects to many adjacent or nearby parks, including Tideman Johnson Natural Area, Powell Butte, and others.

== History ==
The Springwater Division rail line was named for a planned connection to Springwater, Oregon.

The Portland Traction Company operated rail service from Portland to Boring from 1903 until 1989. Passenger service peaked in 1906 and ended in 1958. Oaks Amusement Park—and five other city parks—were built to encourage weekend passenger traffic. Freight trains brought farm produce into Portland.

When the Oregon Department of Transportation (ODOT) began a project to widen Oregon Highway 99E, a new, expensive overpass was required for the rail line. Citing low traffic volumes, construction was refused and the line was put up for sale. This was of great interest to the 40-Mile Loop Trust, a conservation effort formed in 1981 to build a trail around Portland connecting its many parks. Planned since 1904, it had made little progress. The Trust proved effective at getting many key governmental agencies to work with each other. Its representatives called upon the Southern Pacific and Union Pacific railroads, co-owners of the abandoned line, to transfer the land to the Trust. This matter was subject of a battle between on-line railroad shippers and Metro. However, by 1990, the deal was completed, and represented a significant step in the completion of the Loop.

During master planning in 1991 for conversion, the projected use of the corridor was 400,000 people annually, distributed as 56% bicycling, 36% walking, 9% jogging, and 3% equestrian. By 2003, usage was expected to exceed one million users per year. Prior to paving, much of the trail was suitable for mountain biking.

In 1993, Metro completed studies to construct a "South/North" line from Vancouver, WA to Clackamas town via the Springwater Corridor. A 1994 bond measure only partially funded the project and state funding was overturned by the Oregon Supreme Court. As a result, the plans for light rail along the portion of Springwater from Milwaukie to Clackamas were abandoned.

Construction of the east–west segment of the trail between Oregon Highway 99E and Gresham was completed in 1996. An additional mile east of Gresham was built in 2000. In 2005, a 3-mile (4.8 km) north–south "Springwater on the Willamette" segment opened between central Portland and the Sellwood Bridge along the Willamette River. Unlike the other sections of the trail, the rail line remained, separated by a fence. The line is currently operated by the Oregon Pacific Railroad.

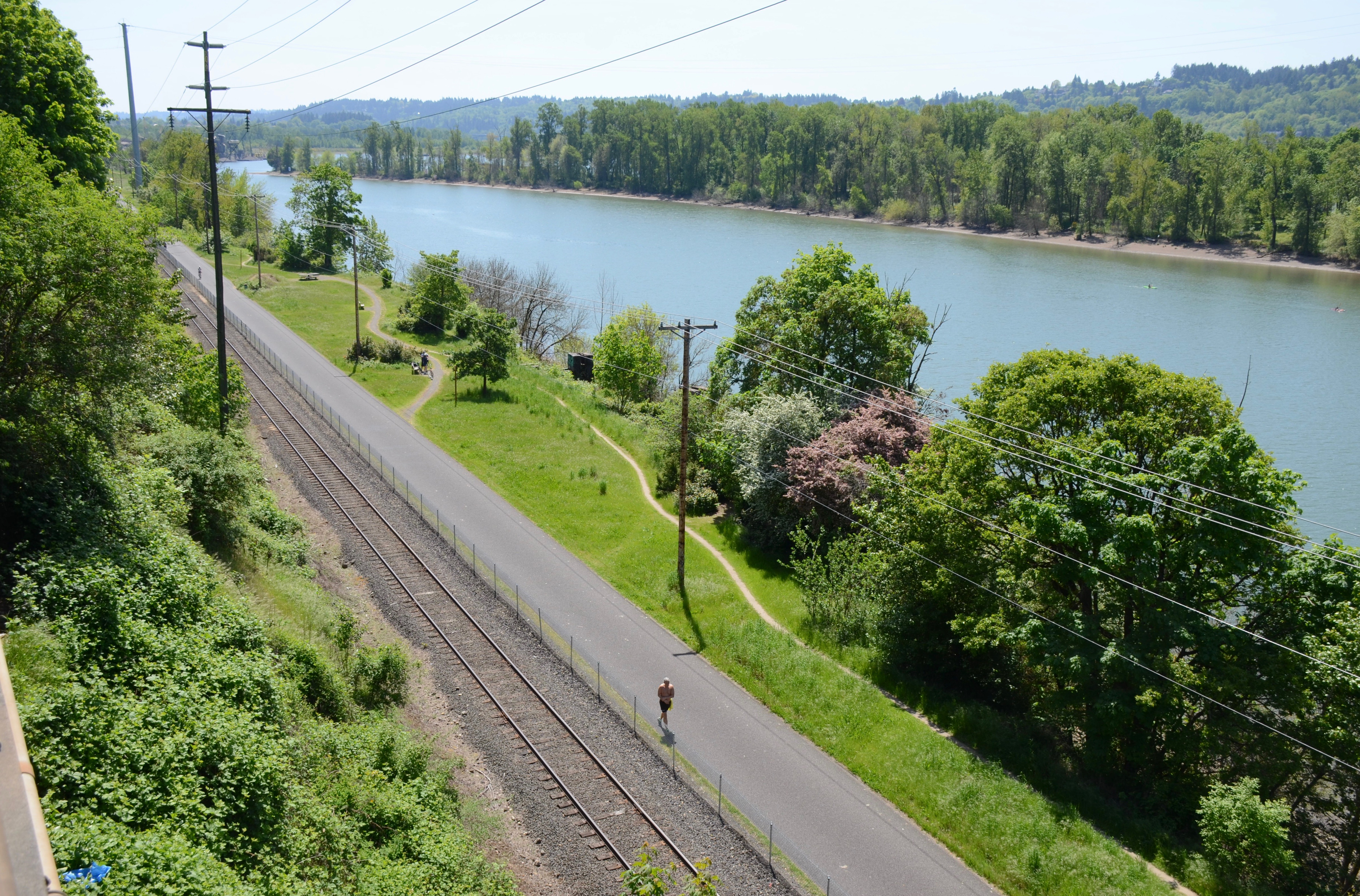
The trail's westernmost section, a north–south segment in Portland, runs near the east bank of the Willamette River and alongside a still-in-use Oregon Pacific Railroad track.

In 2003, Portland was one of 25 cities that received a $200,000 grant from Active Living by Design to promote urban planning that encourages physical activity. Some of the money was allocated to a Lents Station interpretive trailhead along the Springwater Corridor. The last significant section of the trail was completed ahead of schedule in summer 2006, when the construction of three new bridges over Johnson Creek, Oregon Highway 99E and a railroad line, allowing users to cross them without having to detour and mix with traffic on busy streets.

In 2006, the City of Portland rejected a development proposal for a property that did not include an easement for a greenway along the Willamette River, and would have prevented completion of a planned connection between the Springwater Trail and the Eastbank Esplanade. The easement requirement was upheld by the Oregon Court of Appeals on February 13, 2008.

As of 2012, a one-mile (1.6 km) gap in the Sellwood area remains, but there were plans to reduce it. This segment was one of the parks and trails recommended for funding by a Metro advisory panel in 2001.

In 2013, paving was completed on a 2.25-mile (3.62 km) stretch from Rugg Road to Boring Station Trailhead Park. There is a proposal to continue this trail to connect the 40-Mile Loop to the Pacific Crest Trail via the Cazadero Trail.

== Homeless encampments ==
The large homeless encampments along the corridor have led to controversy. According to an article published in early 2016 by Bike Portland, aggression by campers toward bicyclists using the trail increased between 2011 and 2016. Cyclists—citing verbal threats, broken glass on the trail, trash in the adjacent greenery, human feces, and signs of illegal drug use—expressed concerns for their personal safety. Bike Portland discussed the communication between one of its readers and a police officer. According to the officer, a brief filed in August 2015 by a district court judge in Idaho (1:09-cv-540-REB) had influenced policing decisions about encampments. The Bike Portland discussion summarized the police position that "enforcing certain laws on people who live outside, when there is not adequate indoor housing available, would be unconstitutional." In September 2016, the City of Portland moved about 100 people experiencing homelessness from encampments along a 14-mile (23 km) stretch of the corridor in the southeast part of the city. Despite camper protests, the removal went "relatively smoothly though many campers said they had no other place to go and it remained unclear what impact the sweep had on the city’s overall issue of homelessness." As of 2015, the total number of people experiencing homelessness in Multnomah County, including Portland, was estimated at 4,000, including about 1,800 who generally slept outside.

== Locations ==
Map

Location	Coordinates	Trail location		Elevation	
Location	Coordinates	mi	km	ft	m
SE Fourth Ave. & SE Ivon St. trailhead	45.5038611°N 122.6618861°W	0.0	0	51	16
SE Umatilla St. (temporary trail end)	45.4629694°N 122.6606139°W	3.1	5.0	70	21
SE 19th Ave. & Ochoco St. (trail resumes)	45.4587472°N 122.6449472°W	4.2	6.8	73	22
Tideman Johnson Natural Area	45.4632472°N 122.6239222°W	5.1	8.2	103	31
Interstate 205	45.4722861°N 122.5661806°W	8.7	14.0	206	63
Linneman Station	45.4872944°N 122.4753306°W	13.4	21.6	266	81
SE 267th Ave. & SE Rugg Rd. trail access	45.4603722°N 122.3882583°W	18.9	30.4	427	130
Boring (paved in 2013)	45.4318611°N 122.3753306°W	21	34	517	158

== See also ==
- List of rail trails
- Oaks Bottom Wildlife Refuge
- Samtrak

== Gallery ==
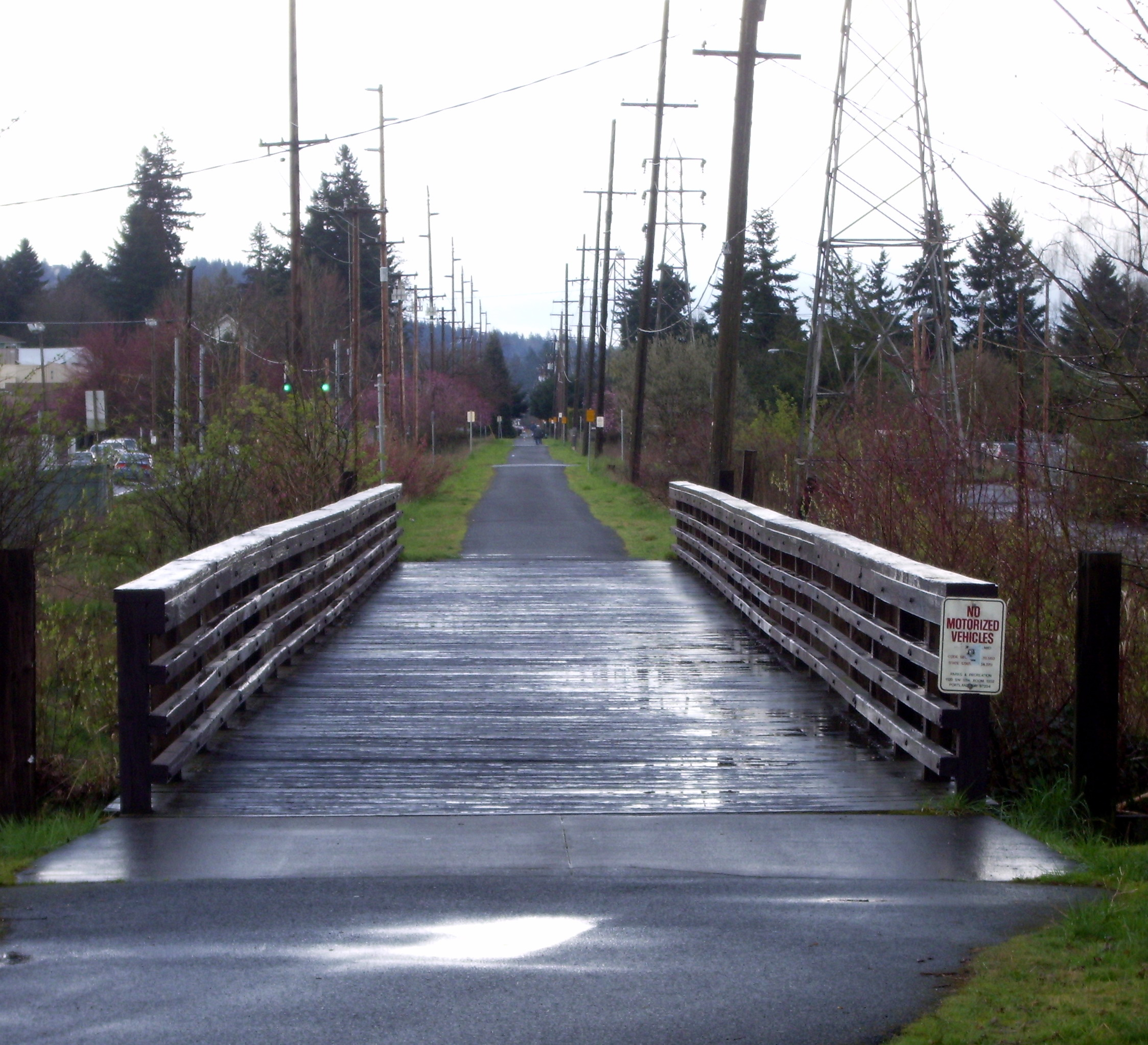
This straight portion parallels Johnson Creek Blvd. and crosses many intersecting streets.

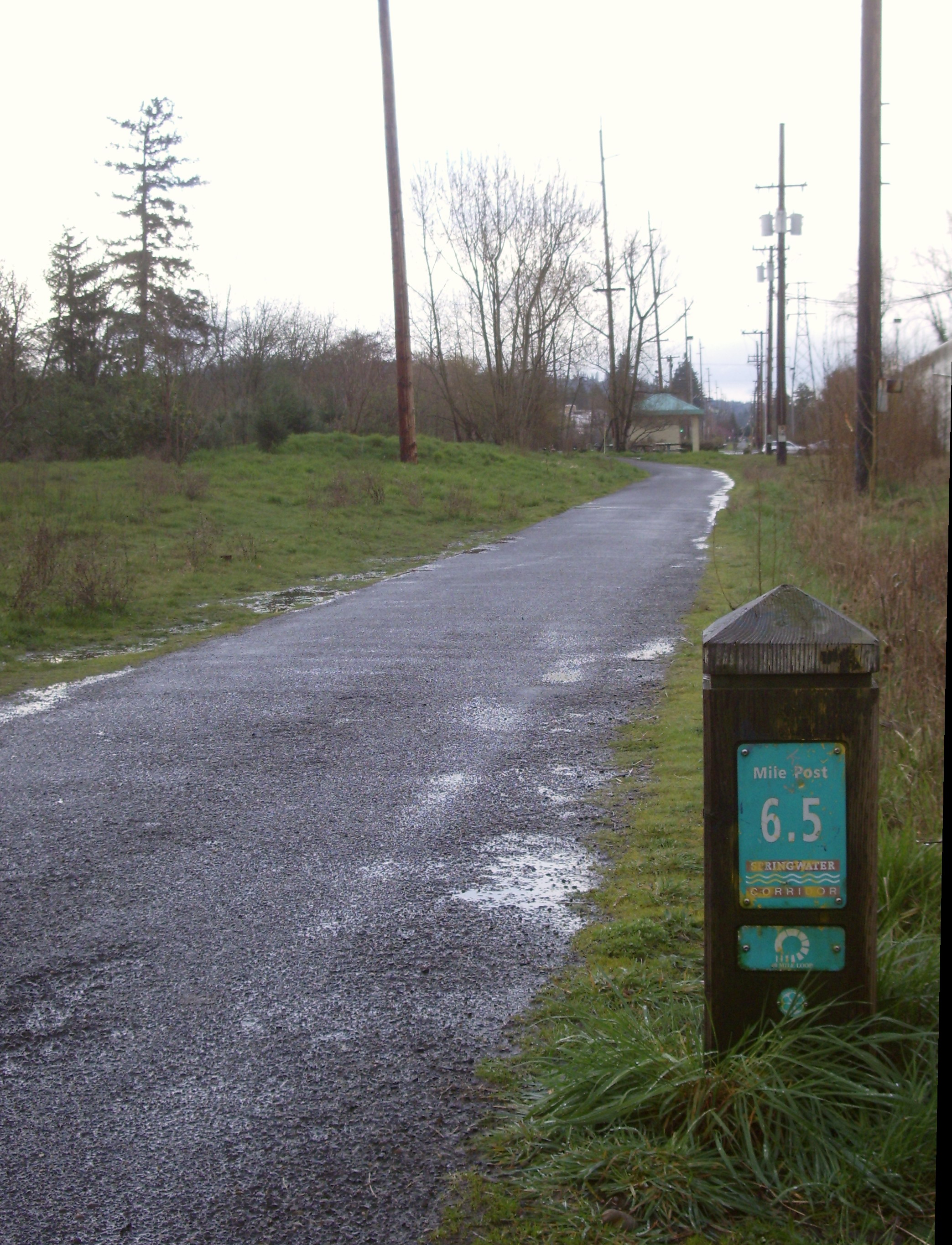
Most of the trail is bordered by fields and trees.

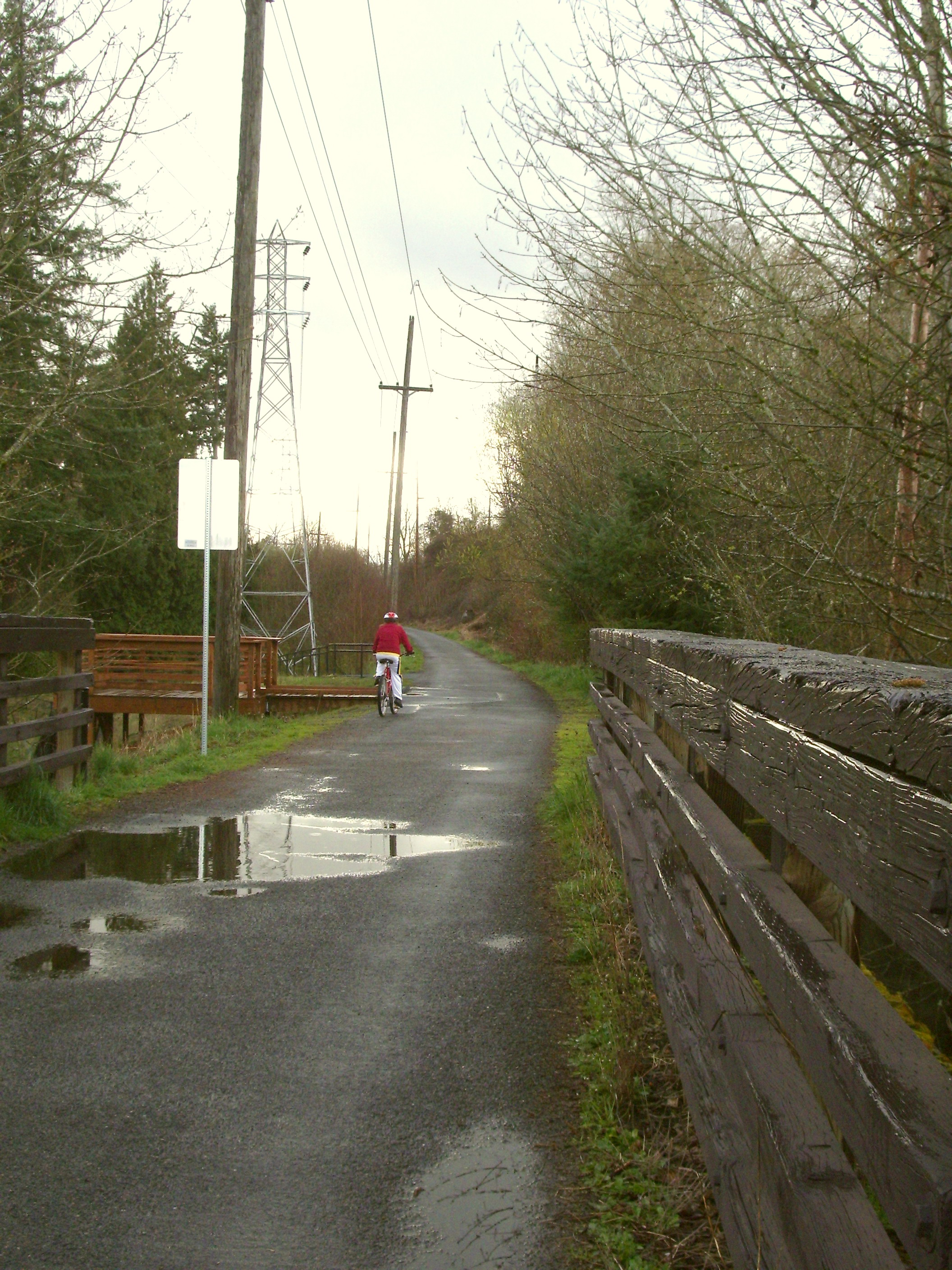
Corridor adjacent to Tideman Johnson Natural Area

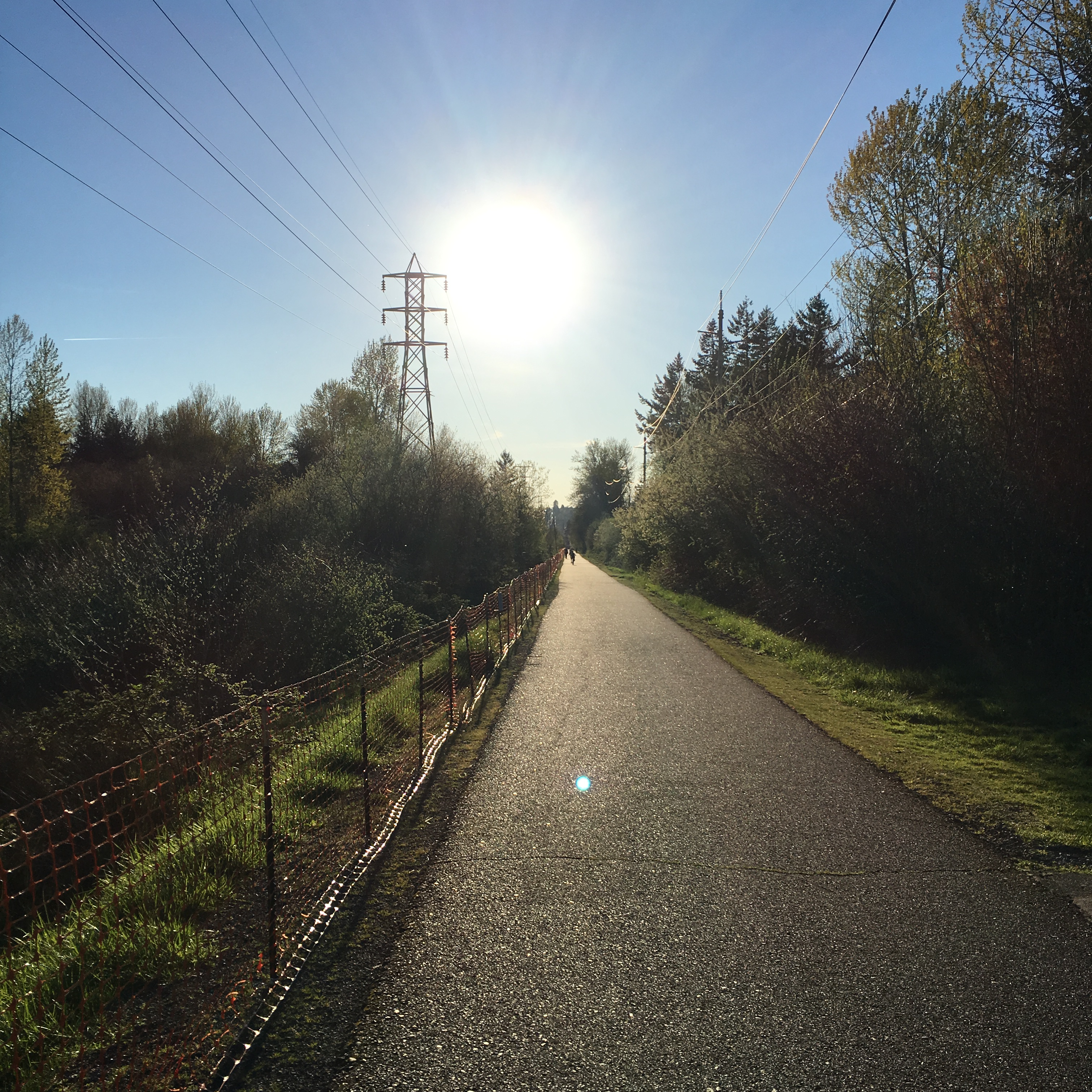
Springwater Trail in Gresham
