= Cazadero Trail =

Multi-use trail in Oregon, United States

Coordinates: 45.3741°N 122.3839°W

The Cazadero Trail is a multi-use trail in the U.S. state of Oregon in a rural area of southeastern Portland.

The 5.8-mile (9.3 km) route connects Boring to historic Cazadero, two miles upriver from Estacada, following the long abandoned rail line of Oregon Water Power and Railway Company. The trail extends the Springwater Corridor from downtown Portland to Barton, a 4-mile (6.4 km) extension.

The trail goes along a section of Deep Creek in Deep Canyon. There are jays, robins, and northern flicker, and an occasional red tailed hawk or turkey vulture soaring.

Plans eventually include extending the trail to the Pacific Crest Trail.
