= Olmsted Portland park plan =

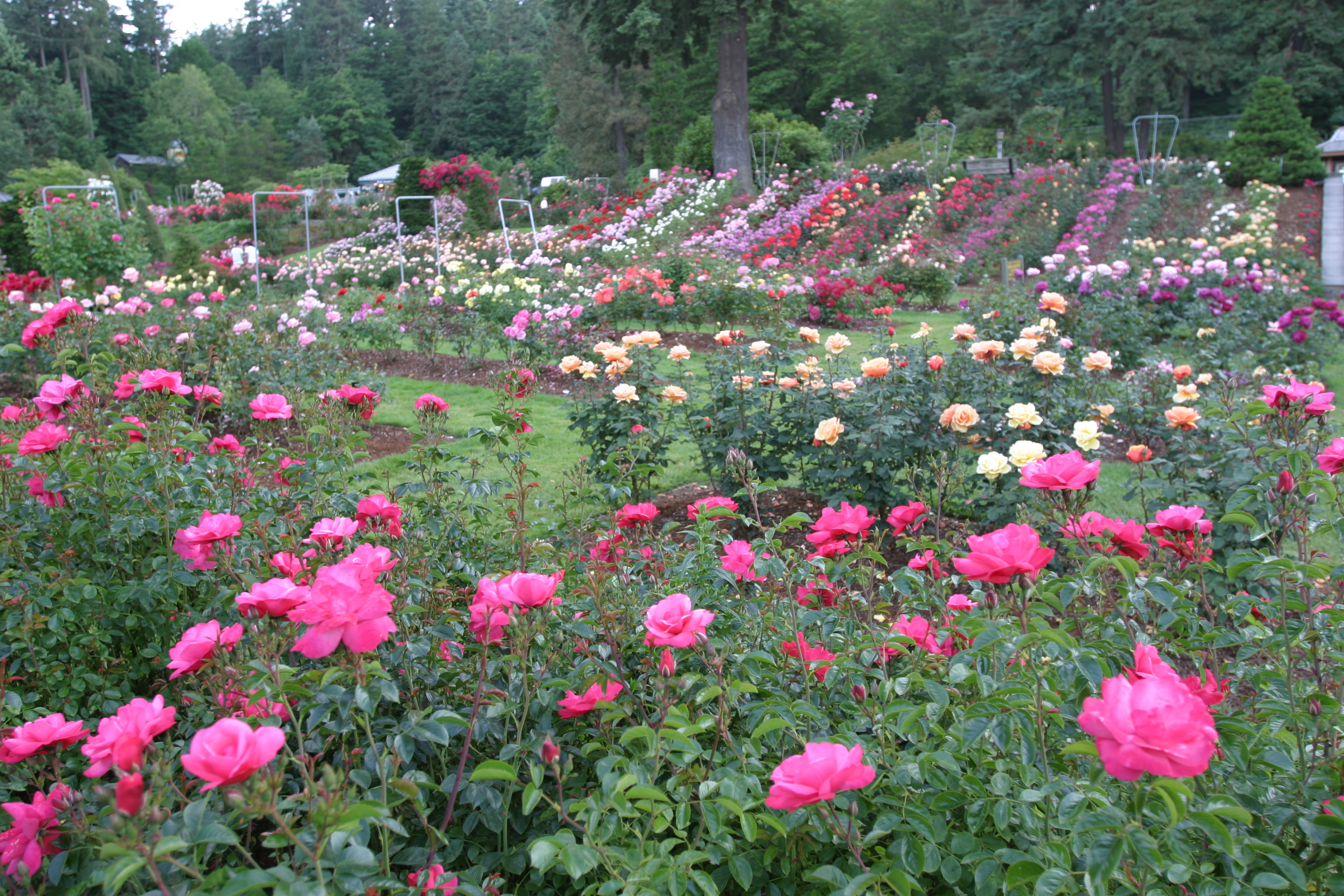
International Rose Test Garden in Washington Park, one of many greenspaces suggested by the Olmsted Report

The plan for a park system in Portland, Oregon, produced by the Olmsted Brothers landscape architecture firm in 1903 served as the model for much of the young U.S. city's development, including neighborhood and regional parks, scenic boulevards, and pedestrian pathways. The Olmsteds were retained by the city's new Park Board (an early predecessor of Portland Parks & Recreation), under the guidance of board member Thomas Lamb Eliot. The comprehensive plan was typical of the City Beautiful movement, and was brought to Portland during the run-up to the 1905 Lewis and Clark Centennial Exposition. The report was published as an appendix to the Park Board's annual report on December 31, 1903.

Emanuel Tillman Mische, formerly an employee of the Olmsted Brothers, was hired to oversee the implementation of the plan in 1908, serving until 1914 as Parks Superintendent. The city, however, was slow to acquire the necessary lands to implement the plan, as prices rose quickly; in 1909 John Olmsted stated that "Portland is not awake to her opportunities." In the decades since, however, the plan has served to guide most of the development of Portland's parks.
