= Springwater, Oregon =

Unincorporated community in the state of Oregon, United States

Springwater
- Unincorporated community
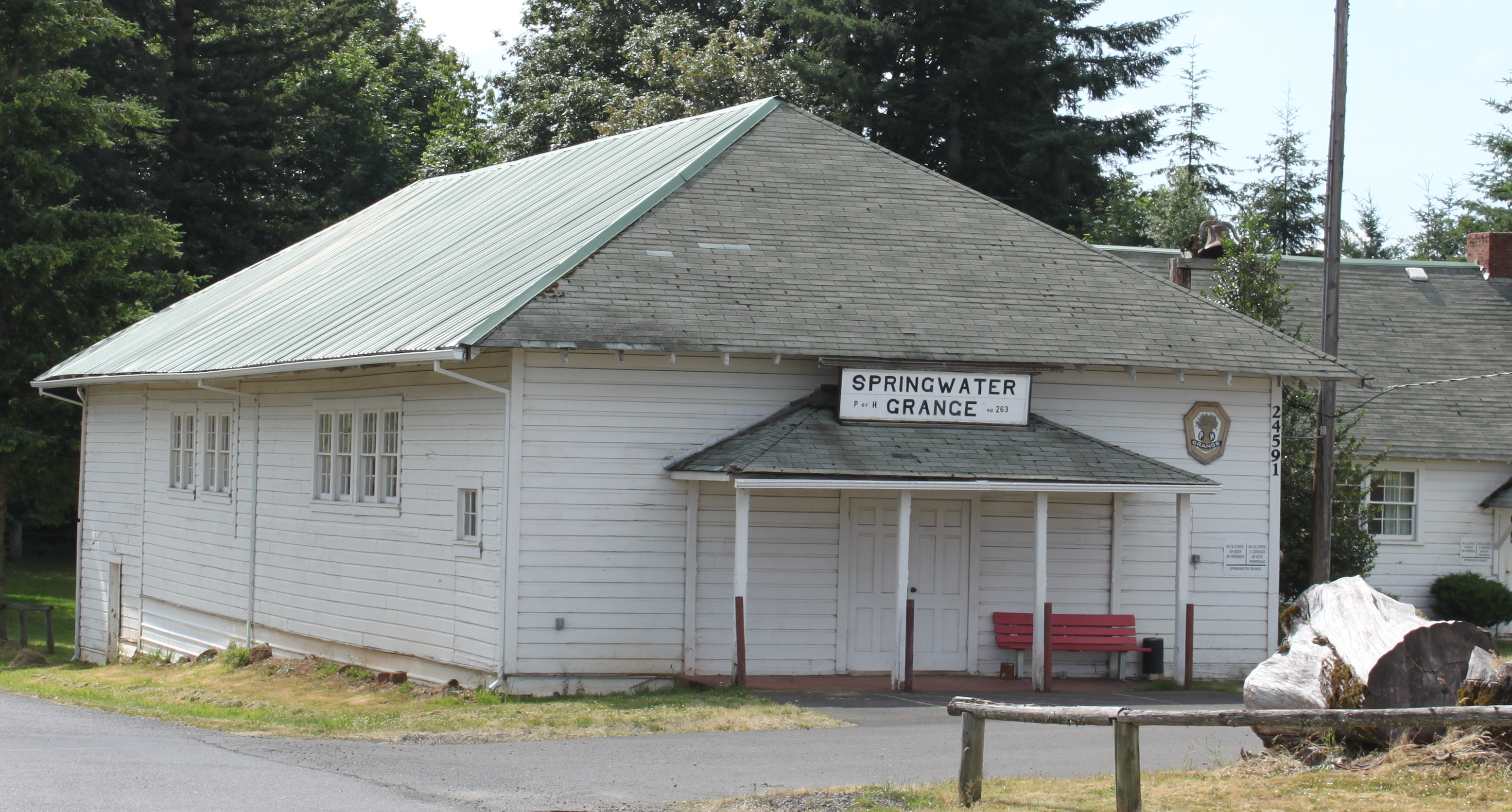
- Grange Hall in Springwater

- Location within the state of Oregon Springwater (the United States)
- Coordinates: 45°15′02″N 122°20′22″W
- Country: United States
- State: Oregon
- County: Clackamas
- Elevation: 1,135 ft (346 m)
- Time zone: UTC-8 (Pacific (PST))
  - Summer (DST): UTC-7 (PDT)
- GNIS feature ID: 1150201

Springwater is an unincorporated rural community in Clackamas County, Oregon, United States, about three miles (4.8 km) south of Estacada on Oregon Route 211. So named since pioneer days, it was one of the first places on the upper Clackamas River to have a post office. Springwater post office ran from 1874 to 1914, with George A. Crawford as the first postmaster. The historic wooden Springwater Presbyterian Church was built c. 1890. The Springwater Grange has celebrated a Springwater Fair every year since 1923.

== See also ==
- Springwater Corridor
