= Tideman Johnson Natural Area =

Public park in Portland, Oregon, U.S.

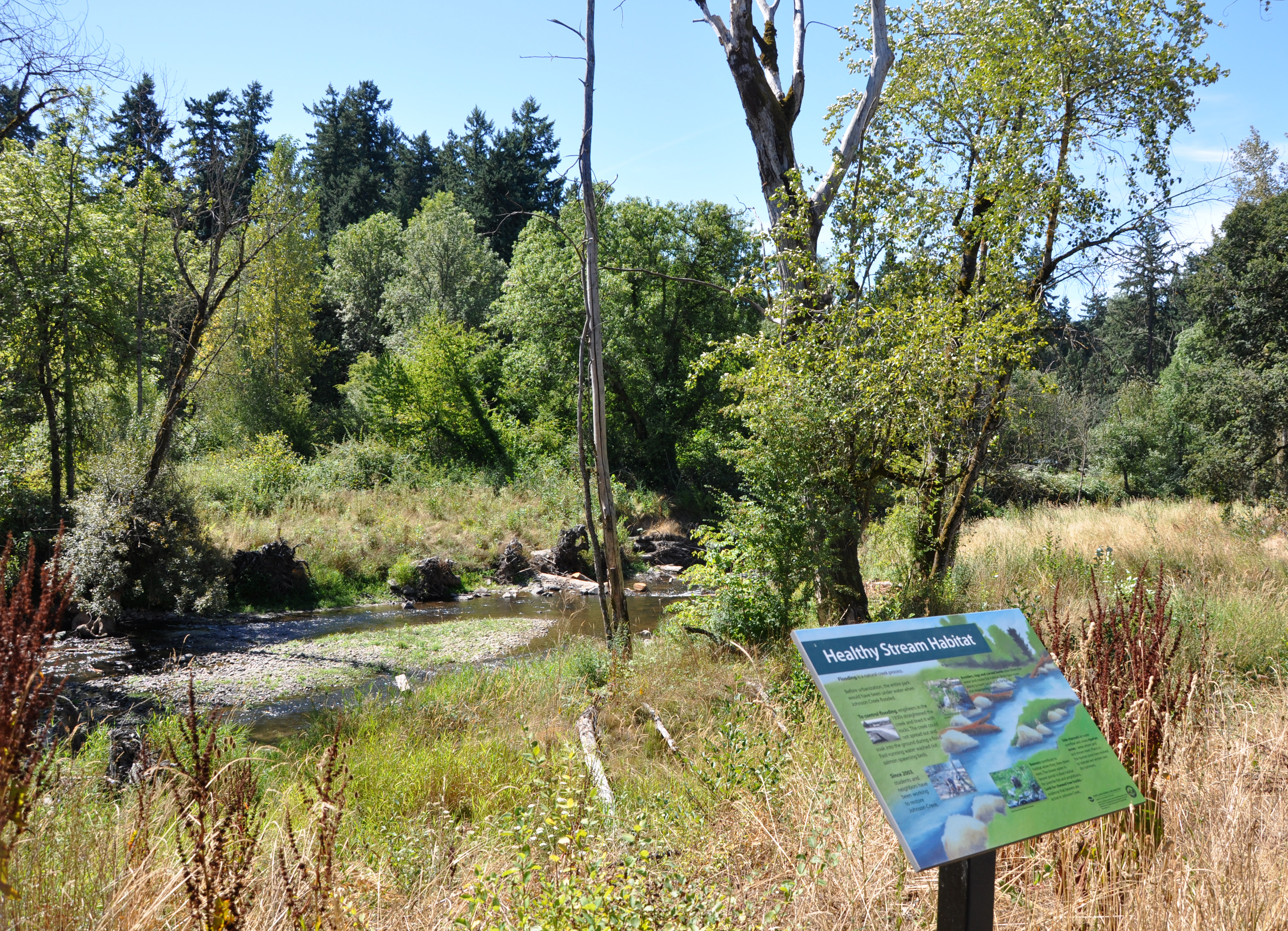
- Creek and woods in the park, 2010
- Interactive map of Tideman Johnson Natural Area
- Type: Urban park
- Location: Southeast 37th Avenue and Tenino Street; Portland, Oregon, U.S.
- Coordinates: 45°27′46″N 122°37′24″W
- Area: 7.59 acres (3.07 ha)
- Created: 1940
- Operator: Portland Parks & Recreation

Tideman Johnson Natural Area is a city park of about 7.7 acres (3.1 ha) in southeast Portland, in the U.S. state of Oregon. Located at Southeast 37th Avenue and Tenino Street along Johnson Creek, the site is named for a mid-19th century family named Johnson that encouraged public use of its land along the creek. (Note: Tideman Johnson settled in the area in 1878 but was unrelated to the Johnson for whom the creek is named. Tideman, his wife Olava and daughter Minnie are buried in Portland's Lone Fir Cemetery. Tideman's great-grandson, Steve Johnson, still lives along the creek and is an adjunct professor of urban studies and planning at Portland State University and a founder of the Johnson Creek Watershed Council, which links interests along the stream.) The park has paved and unpaved paths for hiking. A loop trail and boardwalk off the Springwater Corridor runs through the park.

== Ecology ==
A good area for bird-watching, the park attracts owls, pigeons, kingfishers, and herons. In late spring and early summer, Tideman Johnson's big-leaf maples, alders, and other trees are frequented by warblers, grosbeaks and mourning doves. Other birds commonly seen in the park include sapsuckers, woodpeckers, chickadees, and bushtits. During a restoration project completed in 2006, workers identified 22 fish species in the creek at Tideman Johnson and counted 23 Chinook salmon and 107 steelhead trout.

== Maintenance ==
Portland's Bureau of Environmental Services (BES) undertook the 2006 project to repair a sewer line that runs through the park. In 1922, when it was constructed, the Lents Interceptor sewer was buried about 5 feet (1.5 m) beneath Johnson Creek. Over the years, the stream washed away the fill above the pipe, exposing it to possible damage. Workers surrounded the pipe with concrete during the project and covered it with rock. They also reshaped stream banks, planted 5,300 trees and shrubs, and added boulders and woody debris to the stream to prevent erosion and improve fish habitat.

== Notes and references ==
Notes
