= Springwater, Wisconsin =

- Town
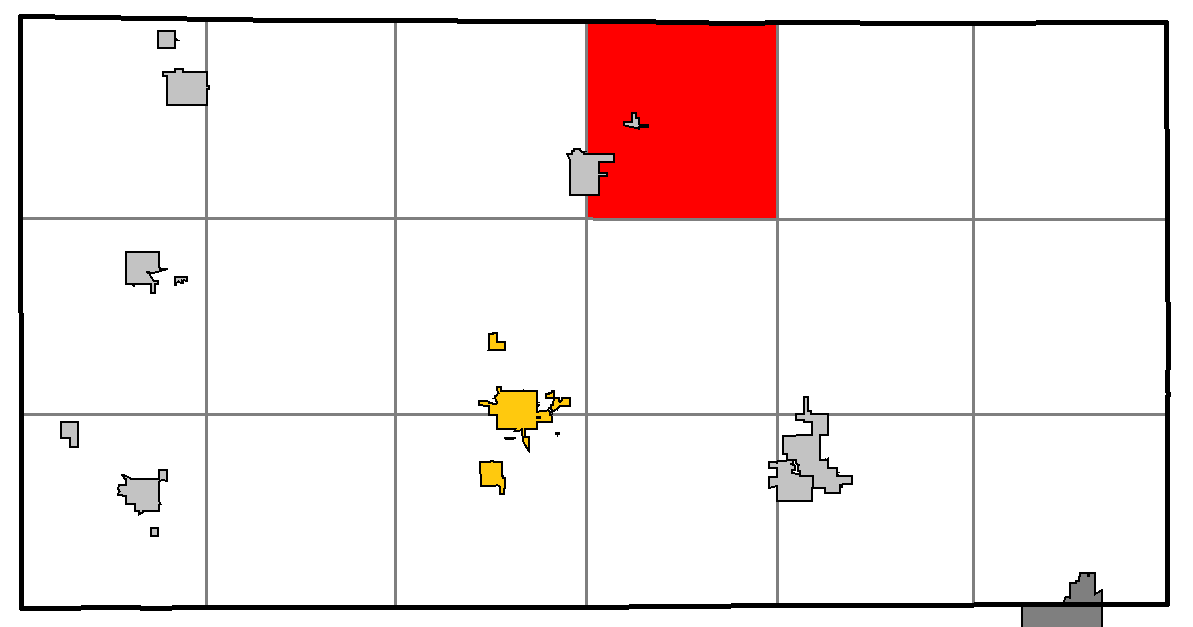
- Location of Springwater, Waushara County

- Location of Waushara County, Wisconsin
- Coordinates: 44°11′57″N 89°10′50″W
- Country: United States
- State: Wisconsin
- County: Waushara

Area
  - Total: 34.8 sq mi (90.2 km^{2})
  - Land: 33.5 sq mi (86.8 km^{2})
  - Water: 1.3 sq mi (3.4 km^{2})
- Elevation: 879 ft (268 m)

Population (2020)
  - Total: 1,257
  - Density: 37.5/sq mi (14.5/km^{2})
- Time zone: UTC-6 (Central (CST))
  - Summer (DST): UTC-5 (CDT)
- FIPS code: 55-76400
- GNIS feature ID: 1584206

Springwater is a town in Waushara County, Wisconsin, United States. The population was 1,257 at the 2020 census.

== Geography ==
According to the United States Census Bureau, the town has a total area of 34.8 square miles (90.2 km^{2}), of which 33.5 square miles (86.8 km^{2}) is land and 1.3 square miles (3.4 km^{2}) (3.76%) is water.

== Demographics ==
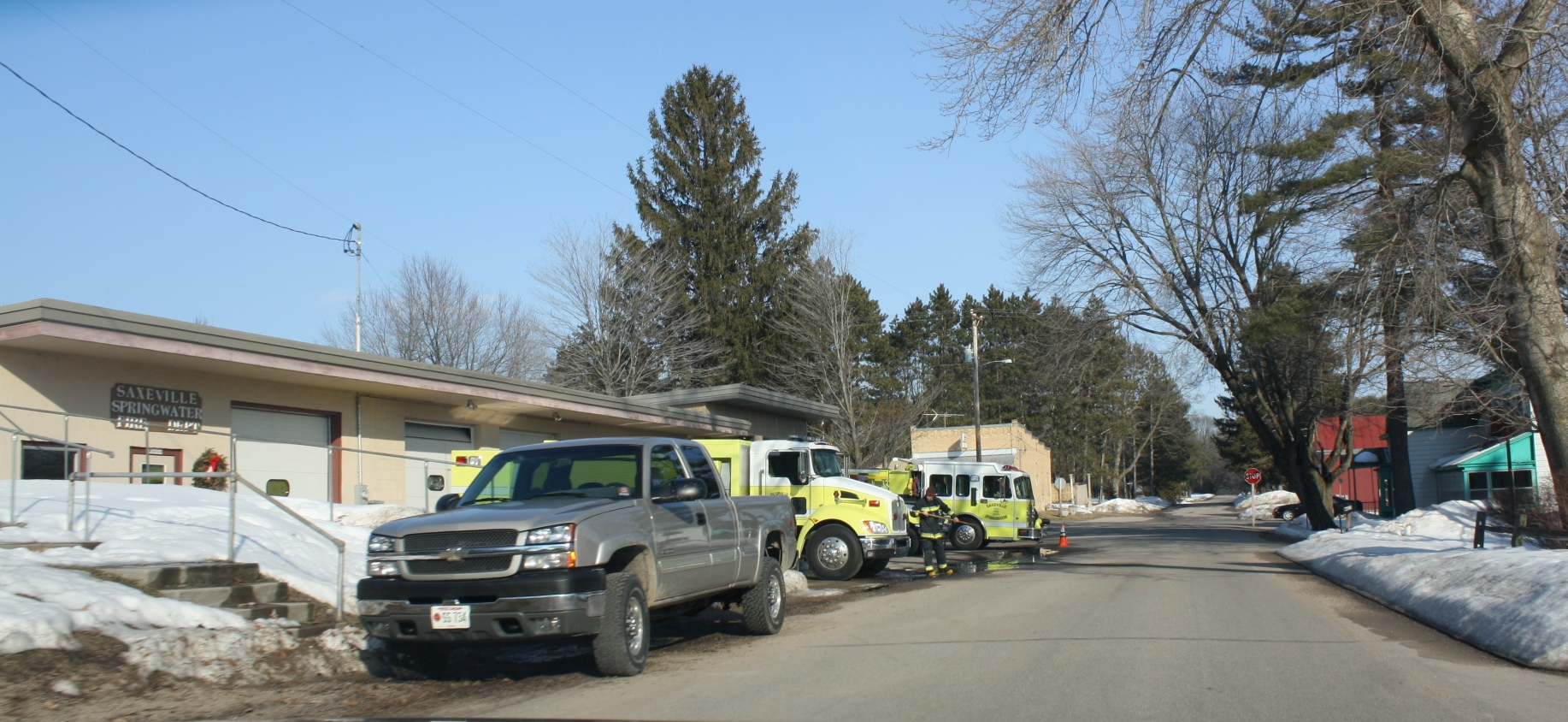
Saxeville/Springwater Fire Department

As of the census of 2000, there were 1,389 people, 617 households, and 430 families residing in the town. The population density was 41.4 people per square mile (16.0/km^{2}). There were 1,420 housing units at an average density of 42.4 per square mile (16.4/km^{2}). The racial makeup of the town was 98.85% White, 0.22% African American, 0.07% Asian, 0.22% from other races, and 0.65% from two or more races. Hispanic or Latino of any race were 0.50% of the population.

There were 617 households, out of which 21.2% had children under the age of 18 living with them, 61.1% were married couples living together, 5.7% had a female householder with no husband present, and 30.3% were non-families. 25.4% of all households were made up of individuals, and 11.5% had someone living alone who was 65 years of age or older. The average household size was 2.25 and the average family size was 2.67.

In the town, the population was spread out, with 19.2% under the age of 18, 4.5% from 18 to 24, 21.1% from 25 to 44, 30.0% from 45 to 64, and 25.1% who were 65 years of age or older. The median age was 49 years. For every 100 females, there were 103.7 males. For every 100 females age 18 and over, there were 101.4 males.

The median income for a household in the town was $35,714, and the median income for a family was $40,385. Males had a median income of $31,780 versus $22,563 for females. The per capita income for the town was $20,586. About 5.6% of families and 8.4% of the population were below the poverty line, including 13.3% of those under age 18 and 8.2% of those age 65 or over.

== See also ==
- Pine Lake, a lake near Springwater, Wisconsin
